= Epimorphosis =

Process of cell regeneration

Epimorphosis is defined as the regeneration of a specific part of an organism in a way that involves extensive cell proliferation of somatic stem cells, dedifferentiation, and reformation, as well as blastema formation. Epimorphosis can be considered a simple model for development, though it only occurs in tissues surrounding the site of injury rather than occurring system-wide. Epimorphosis restores the anatomy of the organism and the original polarity that existed before the destruction of the tissue and/or a structure of the organism. Epimorphic regeneration can be observed in both vertebrates and invertebrates such as the common examples: salamanders, annelids, and planarians.

== History ==
Thomas Hunt Morgan, an evolutionary biologist who also worked with embryology, argued that limb and tissue reformation bore many similarities to embryonic development. Building off of the work of German embryologist Wilhelm Roux, who suggested regeneration was two cooperative but distinct pathways instead of one, Morgan named the two parts of the regenerative process epimorphosis and morphallaxis. Specifically, Morgan wanted epimorphosis to specify the process of entirely new tissues being regrown from an amputation or similar injury, with morphallaxis being coined to describe regeneration that did not use cell proliferation, such as in hydra. The key difference between the two forms of regeneration is that epimorphosis involves cellular proliferation and blastema formation, whereas morphallaxis does not.

== In vertebrates ==
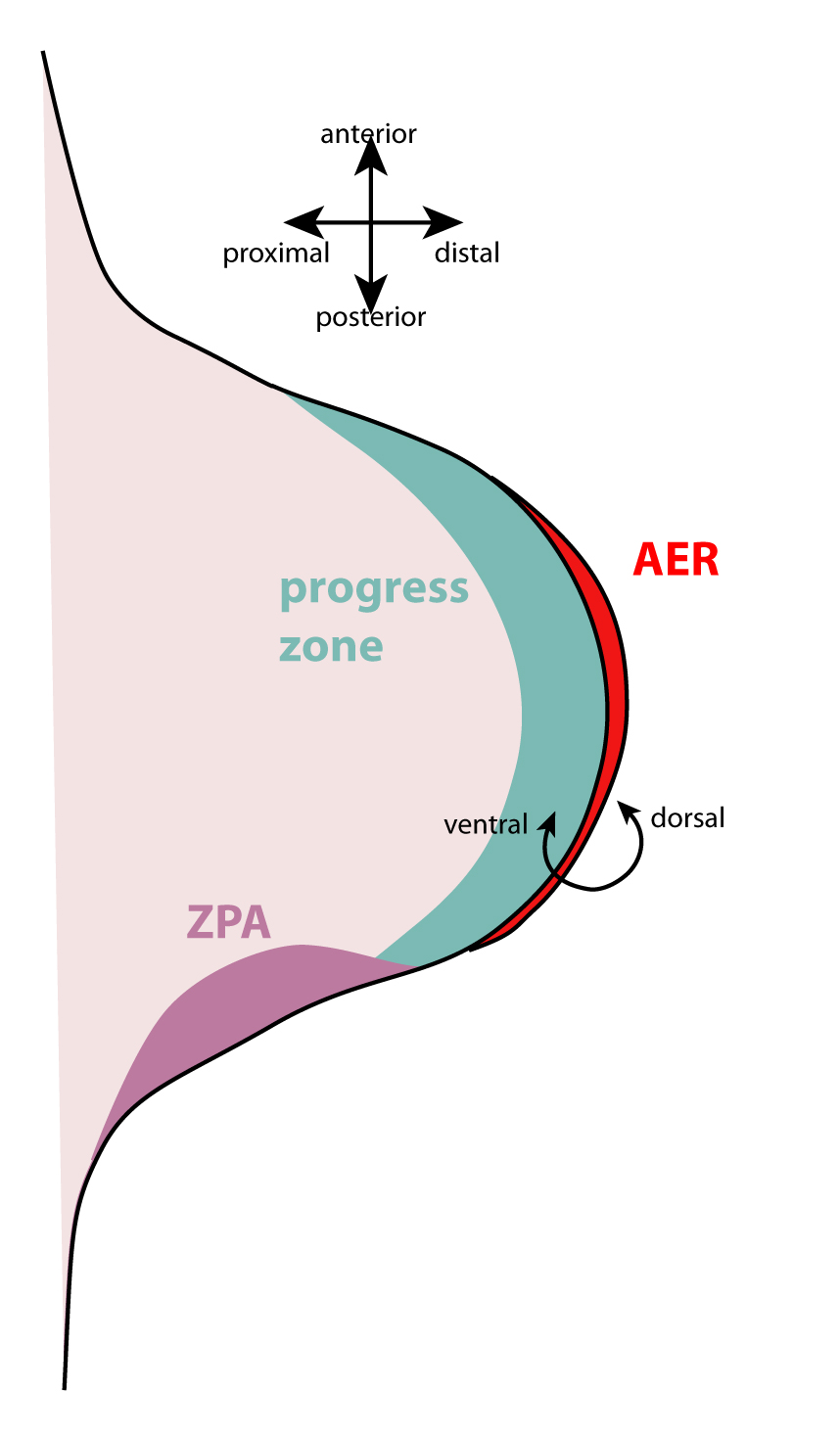
The apical ectodermal ridge in embryonic development is very similar to the apical ectodermal cap in limb regeneration. The progress zone can be seen near to the zone of polarizing activity, which instructs cells on how to orient the limb.

In vertebrates, epimorphosis relies on blastema formation to proliferate cells into the new tissue. Through studies involving zebrafish fins, the toetips of mice, and limb regeneration in axolotls, researchers at the Polish Academy of Sciences found evidence for epimorphosis occurring in a variety of vertebrates, including instances of mammal epimorphosis.

=== Limb regeneration ===
Limb regeneration occurs when a part of an organism is destroyed, and the organism must reform that structure. The general steps for limb regeneration are as follows: epidermis covers the wound which is called the wound healing process, the mesenchyme dedifferentiates into a blastema and a apical ectodermal cap forms, and the limb re-differentiates to form the full limb.

=== Processes in salamanders ===
Epidermal cells at the wound margins migrate to cover the wound and will become the wound epidermis. No scar tissue forms, as it would in mammals. The mesenchymal tissues of the limb stump secrete matrix metalloproteinases (MMPs). As the MMPs are secreted, the wound epithelium thickensand eventually becomes an apical ectodermal cap (AEC) that forms on the tip of the stump. This is similar to the embryonic apical ectodermal ridge, which forms during normal limb development. Under the AEC, the nerves near the site of the limb destroyed are degraded. The AEC causes the progress zone to re-establish; this means the cells under the AEC (including bone, cartilage, fibroblast cells, etc) dedifferentiate and become separated mesenchymal cells that form the blastema. Some tissues express specialized genes (like muscle cells) and so if there is damage to these tissues, the genes become downregulated and the proliferation genes are unregulated. The AEC also releases fibroblast growth factors (FGFs) (including FGF-4 and -8) that drive the development of the new limb, essentially resetting the limb back to its embryonic development stage. However, even though some of the limb cells are able to dedifferentiate, they are not able to fully dedifferentiate to the level of multipotent progenitor cells. During regeneration, only cartilage cells can form new cartilage tissue, only muscle cells can form new muscle tissue, and so on. The dedifferentiated cells still retain their original specification. To begin the physical formation of a new limb, regeneration occurs in a distal to proximal sequence. The distal part of the limb is established first, and then the distal part of the limb interacts with the original proximal part of the limb to form the intermediate portion of the limb known as intercalation.

== In invertebrates ==
=== Periplaneta americana ===
The American cockroach is capable of regenerating limbs that have been damaged or destroyed, such as legs and antennae, as well parts of its compound eye. It does this with lectin—a protein made for binding carbohydrates—named regenectin, which shares a family with other lipopolysaccharide (LPS) binding proteins. Regenectin carries both a regenerative and a system defense function, and it is produced by the cockroach's paracrine system to work with muscle reformation.

=== Capitella teleta ===
C. teleta is a segmented worm found in North America that is capable of regenerating posterior segments after amputation. This regeneration uses the interaction of several sets of Hox genes, as well as blastema formation. All of the Hox genes concerned in epimorphosis are present in the abdominal area of the worm, but not in the anterior portion. However, the genes do not, themselves, direct the anterior-posterior patterning of the worm's thorax.

=== Planaria vitta ===
P. vitta is a flatworm of genus Planaria that, when needed, can draw upon both morphallaxis and epimorphosis to regrow itself; in P. vitta, epimorphosis precedes morphallaxis and lasts about ten days. Planaria begin epimorphosis by the epidermis contracting immediately after the worm is cut at the head as a predator reactionary mechanism in order to decrease the surface area at the site of the cut. This mechanism activates the neoblasts which are totipotent stems cells which allows rhabdites to secrete materials to make a protective mucosal covering and epithelium to gather at the site through spreading of the cells rather than proliferation that occurs in vertebrates The dorsal and ventral epithelial cells then come to the site and become differentiated to begin regeneration. The polarity of the planaria can be reestablished through an anterior-posterior gradient through Wnt/β-catenin signaling pathway. Polarity can be described in planarians that the anterior part of the wound site will create a head of a planaria, and the posterior side will create the tail.
