= Limb bud =

Structure formed early in vertebrate limb development

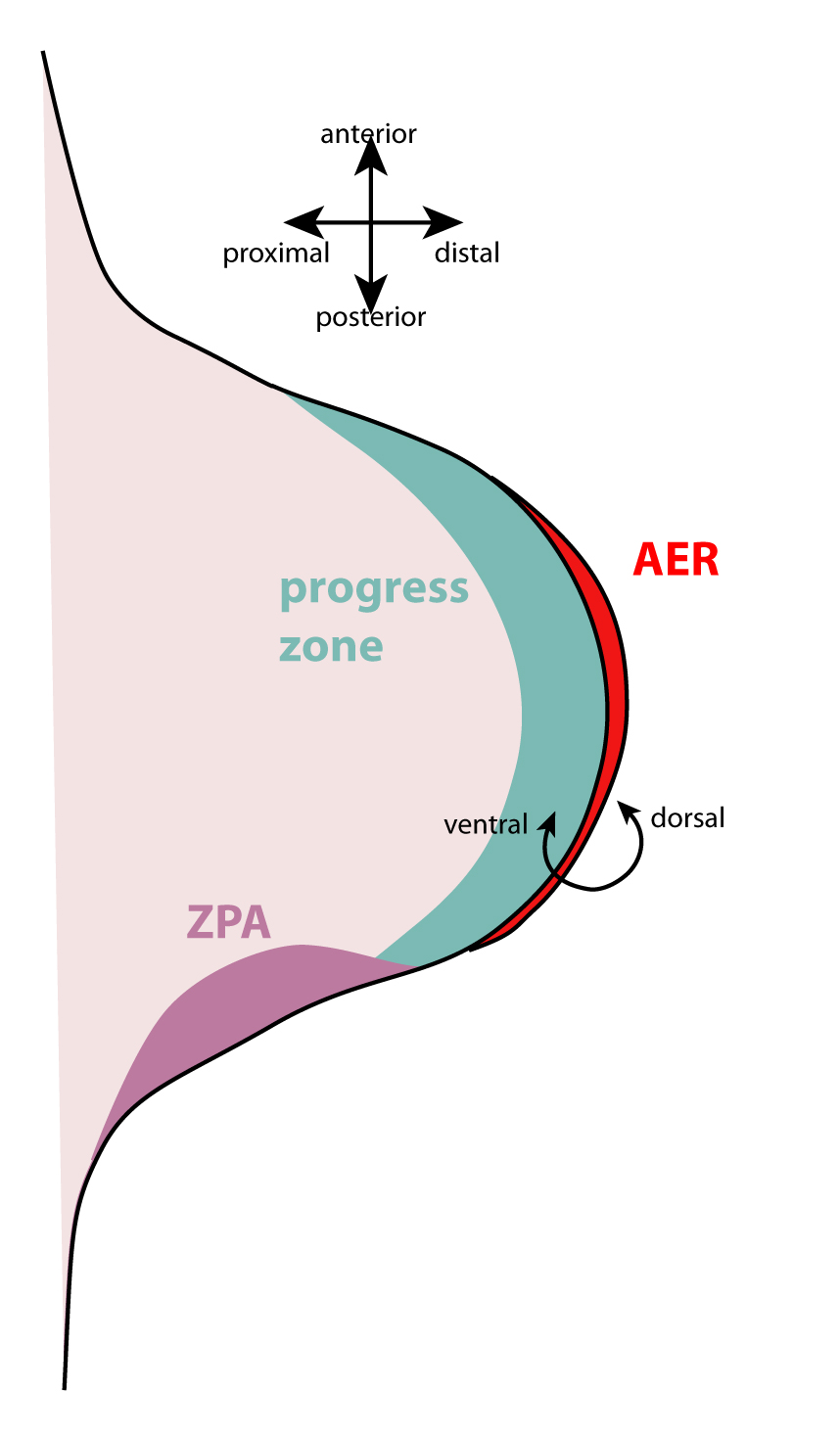

Details
- Precursor: lateral plate mesoderm

Identifiers
- Latin: gemmae membrorum
- MeSH: D018878
- TE: bud_by_E5.0.3.0.0.0.5 E5.0.3.0.0.0.5

The limb bud is a structure formed early in vertebrate limb development. As a result of interactions between the ectoderm and underlying mesoderm, formation occurs roughly around the fourth week of development. In the development of the human embryo the upper limb bud appears in the third week and the lower limb bud appears four days later.

The limb bud consists of undifferentiated mesoderm cells that are sheathed in ectoderm. As a result of cell signaling interactions between the ectoderm and underlying mesoderm cells, formation of the developing limb bud occurs as mesenchymal cells from the lateral plate mesoderm and somites begin to proliferate to the point where they create a bulge under the ectodermal cells above. The mesoderm cells in the limb bud that come from the lateral plate mesoderm will eventually differentiate into the developing limb's connective tissues, such as cartilage, bone, and tendon. Moreover, the mesoderm cells that come from the somites will eventually differentiate into the myogenic cells of the limb muscles.

The limb bud remains active throughout much of limb development as it stimulates the creation and positive feedback retention of two signaling regions: the apical ectodermal ridge (AER) and the zone of polarizing activity (ZPA) with the mesenchymal cells. These signaling centers are crucial to the proper formation of a limb that is correctly oriented with its corresponding axial polarity in the developing organism. Research has determined that the AER signaling region within the limb bud determines the proximal-distal axis formation of the limb using FGF signals. ZPA signaling establishes the anterior-posterior axis formation of the limb using Shh signals. Additionally, though not known as a specific signaling region like AER and ZPA, the dorsal-ventral axis is established in the limb bud by the competitive Wnt7a and BMP signals that the dorsal ectoderm and ventral ectoderm use respectively. Because all of these signaling systems reciprocally sustain each other's activity, limb development is essentially autonomous after these signaling regions have been established.

== Position and formation ==
The Hox genes, which define features along the anterior-posterior axis of a developing organism, determine at which points along the axis that limb buds will form. Though limbs emerge at different locations in different species, their positions always correlate with the level of Hox gene expression along the anterior-posterior axis. All limb buds must also rely on other signaling factors to obtain their forelimb or hindlimb identity; Hox gene expression influences expression of T-box proteins that, in turn, determine limb identity for certain organisms.

In turn, the activation of T-box protein activates signaling cascades that involve the Wnt signaling pathway and FGF signals. Before limb development begins, T-box proteins initiate FGF10 expression in the proliferating mesenchymal cells of the lateral plate mesoderm, which form the limb bud mesoderm. WNT2B and WNT8C stabilize this FGF10 expression in the forelimb and hindlimb, respectively. This FGF10 expression stimulates WNT3 expression in the above ectodermal cells – resulting in formation of the apical ectodermal ridge as well as inducing FGF8 expression. The FGF8 secreted by the AER acts to keep the cells of the limb mesenchyme in a mitotically active state and sustains their production of FGF10. positive feedback loop between the limb mesenchymal cells and the AER maintains the continued growth and development of the entire limb.

In addition to limb outgrowth, the formation of a crucial signaling center, the zone of polarizing activity (ZPA), in a small posterior portion of the limb bud helps to establish anterior-posterior polarity in the limb through secretion of the protein Sonic hedgehog (Shh). The ZPA also plays an important role in initially specifying digit identity, while later maintaining proper AER morphology and continued FGF8 secretion – to ensure proper mitotic activity of the limb bud mesenchyme beneath.

In chickens, Tbx4 specifies hindlimb status, while Tbx5 specifies forelimb status. In mice, however, both hindlimbs and forelimbs can develop in the presence of either Tbx4 or Tbx5. In fact, it is the Pitx1 and Pitx2 genes that appears to be necessary for specification of the developing hindlimb, whereas their absence results in forelimb development.Tbx4 and Tbx5 appear to be important specifically for limb outgrowth in mice.

== Relationship between hox gene expression and limb patterning ==
Within the limb bud, expression of specific Hox genes varies as a function of the position along the anterior-posterior axis. The Hox genes are linked in four chromosomal clusters: Hoxa, Hoxb, Hoxc, and Hoxd. Their physical position on the chromosome correlates with the time and place of expression. This statement is supported by the knowledge that Hox gene expression is initiated during gastrulation in primitive somitic mesoderm by FGF signaling which effects the primitive somitic mesoderm cells at different times depending on their axial location during organism development—and is even further specified with other anterior-posterior axis signals (such as retinoic acid). Additional evidence for the role that Hox genes play in limb development was found when researchers effected Hox gene expressions in zebrafish by adding retinoic acid during gastrulation; This experiment resulted in a duplication of limbs. Although excess retinoic acid can alter limb patterning by ectopically activating Shh expression, genetic studies in mouse that eliminate retinoic acid synthesis have shown that RA is not required for limb patterning.

Chicken development is a wonderful example of this specificity of Hox gene expression in regard to limb development. The most 3’ Hoxc genes (HOXC4, HOXC5) are expressed only in the anterior limbs in chickens, while the more 5’ genes (HOXC9, HOXC10, HOXC11) are expressed only in the posterior limbs. The intermediate genes (HOXC6, HOXC8) are expressed in both the upper and lower limbs in chickens.

As previously stated, limb development is essentially autonomous after the signaling centers (AER) and ZPA) have been established. However, it is important to know that Hox genes continue to participate in the dynamic regulation of limb development even after the AER and ZPA have been established in the limb bud. Complex communication ensues as AER-secreted FGF signals and ZPA-secreted Shh signals initiate and regulate Hox gene expression in the developing limb bud. Though many of the finer details remain to be resolved, a number of significant connections between Hox gene expression and the impact on limb development have been discovered.

The pattern of Hox gene expression can be divided up into three phases throughout limb bud development, which corresponds to three key boundaries in proximal-distal limb development. The transition from the first phase to the second phase is marked by the introduction of Shh signals from the ZPA. The transition into the third phase is then marked by changes in how the limb bud mesenchymal cells responds to Shh signals. This means that although Shh signaling is required, its effects change over time as the mesoderm is primed to respond to it differently. These three phases of regulation reveal a mechanism by which natural selection can independently modify each of the three limb segments – the stylopod, the zeugopod, and the autopod.

== Relevant experiments ==
FGF10 can induce limb formation, but T-box proteins, Pitx1, and Hox genes determine identity

By mimicking the initial FGF10 secretions of the lateral plate mesoderm cells, limb development can be initiated. Other signaling molecules are implicated in determining the limb's identity.

1. Placement of FGF10-containing beads beneath chick ectodermal cells results in the formation a limb bud, AER, ZPA and, subsequently, an entire limb. When the beads created limb buds towards the anterior region, forelimb formation coincided with Tbx5 expression, while hindlimb formation coincided with Tbx4 expression. When beads were placed in the middle of the flank tissue, the anterior portion expressed Tbx5 and forelimb features, while the posterior portion of the limb expressed Tbx4 and hindlimb features.
2. When chick embryos were engineered to constitutively express Tbx4 (via viral-transfection) throughout their flank tissue, every limb they grew was a leg, even those that formed in the anterior region, which would normally become wings. This confirms the role of T-box proteins in the type of limb that develops.
3. Knocking out Tbx4 or Tbx5 knockout prevents FGF10 expression in the lateral plate mesoderm in mice.
4. The Hox pathway affects Tbx expression, which in turn affects FGF10 expression.
5. When Pitx1 was incorrectly expressed in mouse forelimbs, several hindlimb-associated genes (Tbx4, HOXC10) were turned on and drastic alterations of the muscles, bones, and tendons shifted the phenotype towards that of a hindlimb. This indicates that Pitx1—through Tbx4—plays a role in the emergence of hindlimb properties.

HOXD11 expression correlates with Shh signals secretion

HOXD11 is expressed posteriorly, near the ZPA, where the highest levels of Shh signal expression occur.

1. When retinoic acid is applied to induce Shh signal expression, a ZPA is transplanted, or ectopic expression of Shh signaling is stimulated, HOXD11 expression follows.

Cutaneous innervation of the right upper extremity.

Mesenchymal cells determine limb identity, but the AER maintains limb outgrowth through FGF signal secretion

These experiments reveal that the limb mesenchyme contains the necessary information concerning limb identity, but the AER is needed to stimulate the mesenchyme to live up to its destiny (of becoming an arm, leg, etc.)

1. When the AER is removed, limb development halts. If an FGF-bead is added in the AER's place, normal limb development proceeds.
2. When an extra AER is added, two limbs form.
3. When forelimb mesenchyme is replaced with hindlimb mesenchyme, a hindlimb grows.
4. When forelimb mesenchyme is replaced with non-limb mesenchyme, the AER regresses, and limb development halts.

ZPA's role in establishing polarity and further limb development

The ZPA first specifies anterior-posterior polarity (and dictates digit identity), and then, by sustaining AER activity, it ensures that the necessary cell proliferation occurs for normal formation of a five-digit limb.

1. When Shh signals normally secreted from the ZPA are inhibited (either through use of tamoxifen or Shh-null mutants) the AER morphology, particularly its anterior extent, is perturbed and its FGF8 signaling decreased. As a result of Shh downregulation during limb bud expansion, the number of digits was decreased, but the identities of the formed digits was not altered.

== Relevant genes and proteins ==
Associated molecules include:

- FGF10 – Initially, Tbx proteins induce secretion of FGF10 by cells in the lateral plate mesoderm. Later, FGF10 expression is restricted to the developing limb mesenchyme, where it is stabilized by WNT8C or WNT2B. FGF10 expression activates secretion of WNT3A, which acts upon the AER and induces FGF8 expression. The mesenchyme, through FGF10 secretion, is involved in a positive feedback loop with the AER, through FGF8 secretion.
- FGF8 – Secreted by the AER cells. Acts upon the mesenchymal cells, to maintain their proliferative state. Also induces the mesenchymal cells to secrete FGF10, which acts through WNT3A to sustain the AER's expression of FGF8.
- WNT3A – Acts as a middle man in the positive feedback loop between the AER and limb mesenchyme. Activated by FGF10 expression, activates FGF8 expression.
- Sonic hedgehog Secreted by the ZPA in the limb bud mesenchyme. Creates concentration gradient that dictates formation of the five distinct digits. Digit 5 (pinkie) results from exposure to high Shh concentrations, while digit 1 (thumb) on the opposite end of the spectrum develops in response to low concentrations of Shh. Shh expression has been shown in many, but not all circumstances, to be heavily connected with Hox gene expression. Shh also (via Gremlin) blocks bone morphogenic protein (BMP) activity. By blocking BMP activity, FGF expression in the AER is maintained.
- Tbx4, Tbx5 – Involved with the development of hindlimbs versus forelimbs. Though in chicks, they seem to be the primary factors involved in limb identity, in mice it appears that Tbx4 is merely a downstream messenger enforcing the hindlimb-forming instructions of Pitx1. Whether Pitx1 merely diverts a prospective forelimb from that path to become a hindlimb, or if Tbx5 is activated by another Pitx1-like messenger, is unknown.
- Pitx1 – Responsible for the development of a hindlimb-associated phenotype. Tbx4 is one of its downstream targets. Pitx1 and Tbx4 encode transcription factors that are expressed throughout the developing hindlimb but not forelimb buds. Misexpression of Pitx1 in the chick wing bud induced distal expression of Tbx4, as well as HoxC10 and HoxC11, which are normally restricted to hindlimb expression domains. Wing buds in which Pitx1 was misexpressed developed into limbs with some morphological characteristics of hindlimbs.
- Hox genes – Responsible for dictating the anterior-posterior axis of an organism, and are intricately involved in patterning of the developing limb in conjunction with Shh. Influences the activity of T-box proteins and FGF signals (and possibly Pitx1) proteins. Determines where limb buds will form, and what limbs will develop there.
