= Apical ectodermal ridge =

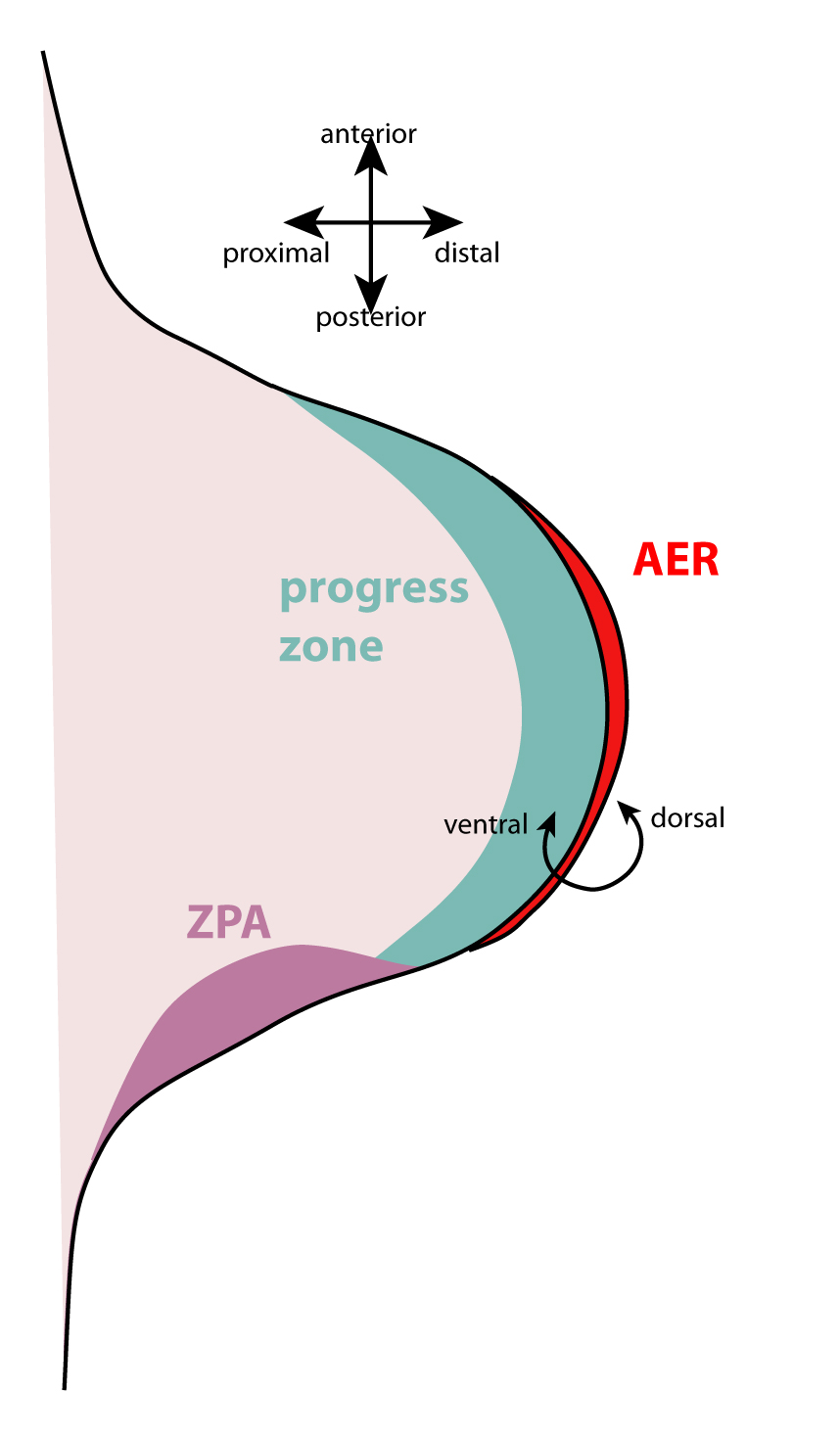
- The apical ectodermal ridge is a region of thickened epithelium at the most distal end of the limb bud. The zone of polarising activity (ZPA) is at the posterior part of the limb bud.

Details

Identifiers
- Latin: crista ectodermalis apicalis
- TE: ectodermal ridge_by_E5.0.3.0.0.3.4 E5.0.3.0.0.3.4

The apical ectodermal ridge (AER) is a structure that forms from the ectodermal cells at the distal end of each limb bud and acts as a major signaling center to ensure proper development of a limb. After the limb bud induces AER formation, the AER and limb mesenchyme—including the zone of polarizing activity (ZPA)—continue to communicate with each other to direct further limb development.

The position of the limb bud, and hence the AER, is specified by the expression boundaries of Hox genes in the embryonic trunk. At these positions, the induction of cell outgrowth is thought to be mediated by a positive feedback loop of fibroblast growth factors (FGFs) between the intermediate mesoderm, the lateral plate mesoderm and the surface ectoderm. FGF8 in the intermediate mesoderm signals to the lateral mesoderm, restricting the expression of FGF10 through intermediate Wnt signals. Then, FGF10 in the lateral plate mesoderm signals to the surface ectoderm to create the AER, which expresses FGF8.

The AER is known to express FGF2, FGF4, FGF8, and FGF9, while the limb bud mesenchyme expresses FGF2 and FGF10. Embryo manipulation experiments have shown that some of these FGFs alone are sufficient for mimicking the AER.

== Structure ==
Morphologically, the AER emerges as a thickening of the ectoderm at the distal rim of the limb bud. This distinct structure runs along the anterior-posterior axis of the limb bud and subsequently separates the dorsal side of the limb from its ventral side.

In the wing bud in chick embryos, the AER becomes anatomically distinguishable at the late stage of development 18HH (corresponding to 3 day-old embryos), when the distal ectodermal cells of the bud acquire a columnar shape distinguishing them from the cuboidal ectoderm. At stage 20HH (corresponding to 3.5 day-old embryos), the AER appears as a strip of pseudostratified epithelium which is maintained until 23-24HH (corresponding to 4-4.5 day-old embryos). Afterwards, the AER progressively decreases in height and eventually regresses.

In mouse embryos, the ventral ectoderm of the emerging forelimb at E9.5 (embryonic day 9.5) already appears thicker in comparison to the dorsal ectoderm and it corresponds to the early AER. By E10, this thickening is more noticeable since the epithelium now consists of two layers and becomes confined to the ventral-distal margin of the bud although it is not detectable in living specimens using light microscope or by scanning electron microscopy (SEM). Between E10.5-11, a linear and compact AER with a polystratified epithelial structure (3-4 layers) has formed and positioned itself at the distal dorso-ventral boundary of the bud. After reaching its maximum height, the AER in mouse limb buds flattens and eventually become indistinguishable from the dorsal and ventral ectoderm. The structure of the human AER is similar to the mouse AER.

In addition to wings in chicks and forelimbs in mice, pectoral fins in zebrafish serve as a model to study vertebrate limb formation. Despite fin and limb developmental processes share many similarities, they exhibit significant differences, one of which is the AER maintenance. While in birds and mammals the limb AER persists until the end of digit-patterning stage and eventually regresses, the fin AER transforms into an extended structure, named the apical ectodermal fold (AEF). After the AER-AEF transition at 36 hours post fertilization, the AEF is located distal to the circumferential blood vessels of the fin bud. The AEF potentially functions as an inhibitor to fin outgrowth since removing the AEF results in the formation of a new AER and subsequently a new AEF. In addition, repeated AF removal leads to excessive elongation of the fin mesenchyme, potentially because of prolonged exposure of AER signals to the fin mesenchyme. Recently, the AER, which has long been thought to consist of only ectodermal cells, in fact composes of both mesodermal and ectodermal cells in zebrafish.

== Associated molecules ==
Associated molecules include:

- FGF10: Initially, Tbx proteins induce secretion of FGF10 by cells in the lateral plate mesoderm. Later, FGF10 expression is restricted to the developing limb mesenchyme, where it is stabilized by WNT8C or WNT2B. FGF10 expression activates secretion of WNT3A, which acts upon the AER and induces FGF8 expression. The mesenchyme, through FGF10 secretion, is involved in a positive feedback loop with the AER, through FGF8 secretion.
- FGF8: Secreted by the apical ectodermal ridge cells. Acts upon the mesenchyme cells, to maintain their proliferative state. Also induces the mesenchymal cells to secrete FGF10, which acts through WNT3A to sustain the AER’s expression of FGF8.
- WNT3A: Acts as an intermediate in the positive feedback loop between the AER and limb mesenchyme. Activated by FGF10 expression, activates FGF8 expression.
- Shh: Secreted by the ZPA in the limb bud mesenchyme. Creates concentration gradient that dictates formation of the five distinct digits. Digit 5 (pinkie) results from exposure to high Shh concentrations, while digit 1 (thumb) on the opposite end of the spectrum develops in response to low concentrations of Shh. Shh expression has been shown in many, but not all circumstances, to be heavily connected with Hox gene expression. Shh also (via Gremlin) blocks bone morphogenic protein (BMP) activity. By blocking BMP activity, FGF expression in the AER is maintained.
- Hox genes: Responsible for dictating the anterior-posterior axis of an organism, and is intricately involved in patterning of the developing limb in conjunction with Shh. Influences the activity of TBX and FGF (and possibly Pitx1) proteins. Determines where limb buds will form, and what limbs will develop there.

== Development ==
FGF10 secretions from the mesenchyme cells of the limb field interact with the ectodermal cells above, and induce the formation of the AER on the distal end of the developing limb. The presence of a dorsal-ventral ectodermal boundary is crucial for AER formation – the AER can only form at that divide.

== Function ==
The AER acts to:

- Maintain the limb mesenchyme in a mitotically active state and focused on its task – the distal outgrowth of the limb. This is achieved by secretion of FGF8, which signals the limb mesodermal cells to continue proliferation, and secreting FGF10, which winds up maintaining the AER.
- Sustain expression of the molecules that establish the anterior-posterior axis. The FGFs secreted by the AER act upon the mesenchyme cells – including the zone of polarizing activity (ZPA). Thus, the AER causes the ZPA to continue secreting Sonic hedgehog (Shh), which is involved with Hox gene expression in establishing the anterior-posterior polarity in the developing limb. Shh also activates Gremlin, which inhibits bone morphogenetic proteins (BMPs) that would normally block FGF expression in the AER. In this manner, the ZPA and AER sustain each other through a positive feedback loop involving FGFs, Shh, and Gremlin.
- Communicate with the proteins that determine the anterior-posterior and dorsal-ventral axes to supply instructions concerning differentiation and cell fates. The FGFs secreted by the AER interact with the limb mesenchyme – including the ZPA – to induce further FGF and Shh expression. These signals then regulate Hox gene expression, which influence differentiation activity and determines what phenotypes the cells will adopt. The secreted Shh also activates Gremlin, which inhibits members of the BMP family. BMPs inhibit FGF expression in the AER, so the FGF secreted by the AER ends up providing feedback (via Shh and Gremlin) that will dictate cellular differentiation involved in sculpting the limb.

=== Relationship between Hox gene expression and limb patterning ===
The Hox genes, which initially establish the anterior-posterior axis of the entire embryo, continue to participate in the dynamic regulation of limb development even after the AER and ZPA have been established. Complex communication ensues as AER-secreted FGFs and ZPA-secreted Shh initiate and regulate Hox gene expression in the developing limb bud. Though many of the finer details remain to be resolved, a number of significant connections between Hox gene expression and the impact on limb development have been discovered. The pattern of Hox gene expression can be divided up into three phases throughout limb bud development, which corresponds to three key boundaries in proximal-distal limb development. The transition from the first phase to the second phase is marked by the introduction of Shh from the ZPA. The transition into the third phase is then marked by changes in how the limb bud mesenchyme responds to Shh signaling. This means that although Shh signaling is required, its effects change over time as the mesoderm is primed to respond to it differently. These three phases of regulation reveal a mechanism by which natural selection can independently modify each of the three limb segments – the stylopod, the zeugopod, and the autopod.

The Hox genes are physically linked in four chromosomal clusters (Hoxa, Hoxb, Hoxc, Hoxd), and their physical position on the chromosome seems to correlate with the time and place of expression. For example, the most 3’ HOXC genes (HOXC4, HOXC5) are expressed only in the anterior limbs (wings) in chickens, while the more 5’ genes (HOXC9, HOXC10, HOXC11) are expressed only in the posterior limbs (legs). The intermediate genes (HOXC6, HOXC8) are expressed in both the upper and lower limbs. Within the limb bud, expression also varies as a function of the position along the anterior-posterior axis. Such is the case with HOXB9, which is most highly expressed next to the AER, and decreases when moving anteriorly to posteriorly, resulting in the least HOXB9 expression next to the posterior ZPA. HOXB9 expression is inversely proportional to the level of Shh expression, which makes sense, as the ZPA secretes Shh. HOXA and HOXD genes for the most part follow nested expression domains, in which they are activated uniformly along the anterior-posterior axis of the limb itself, but not the anterior-posterior axis of the entire body. Whereas HOXC and HOXB genes tend to be restricted to specific limbs, HOXA and HOXD are usually expressed in all limbs. HOXD9 and HOXD10 are expressed in the developing limb throughout the entire anterior-posterior axis, followed by HOXD11, HOXD12, HOXD13, which are each expressed in more posterior regions, with HOXD13 being restricted to only the most posterior regions of the limb bud. As a result, HOXD expression clusters around the posterior ZPA (where HOXD9, 10, 11, 12, and 13 are all expressed), while less expression occurs around the AER, where only HOXD9 and HOXD10 are expressed.

== Transplantation experiments ==
=== Results overview ===
AER maintains limb outgrowth through FGF secretion, mesenchyme cells determine identity

These experiments reveal that the limb mesenchyme contains the necessary information concerning limb identity, but the AER is needed to stimulate the mesenchyme to live up to its destiny (of becoming an arm, leg, etc.)

1. When the AER is removed, limb development halts. If an FGF bead is added in the AER’s place, normal limb development proceeds.
2. When an extra AER is added, two limbs form.
3. When forelimb mesenchyme is replaced with hindlimb mesenchyme, a hindlimb grows.
4. When forelimb mesenchyme is replaced with non-limb mesenchyme, the AER regresses, and limb development halts.
5. When the AER from a late limb bud is transplanted to an earlier limb bud, the limb forms normally. The converse – transplantation of an early limb bud to a late limb bud – also results in normal limb development. However, the underlying mesoderm in the progress zone is fate specified. If progress zone mesoderm is transplanted along with the AER, then additional finger/toes are formed (for an early-to-late transplantation) or the finger/toes are formed too early (for a late-to-early transplantation).

AER formation relies on dorsal-ventral boundary

The precise microenvironmental cues present at the D-V boundary are crucial for AER formation. When the limb bud is dorsalized - in limbless mutants, for example - and no dorsal-ventral boundary exists, the AER is unable to form and limb development halts.

=== Removal/addition of AER ===
The removal of the AER results in truncated limbs where only the stylopod is present. The transplantation of an additional AER results in the duplication of limb structures, usually as a mirror image next to the already developing limb. The mirror image reflection is a result of the transplanted AER obeying signals from the existing ZPA.

=== FGF-soaked beads can mimic the AER ===
Implantation of a plastic bead soaked in FGF-4 or FGF-2 will induce formation of a limb bud in an embryo, but proliferation will cease prematurely unless additional beads are added to maintain appropriate levels of the FGF. Implantation of sufficient beads can induce formation of a 'normal' additional limb at an arbitrary location in the embryo.

=== Ectopic limb formation ===
Transplantation of the AER to flank mesoderm between the normal limb buds results in ectopic limbs. If the AER is transplanted closer to the forelimb bud, the ectopic limb develops like a forelimb. If the AER is transplanted closer to the hindlimb bud, the ectopic limb develops like a hindlimb. If the AER is transplanted near the middle, the ectopic limb has both forelimb and hindlimb features.

=== AER does not specify limb identity ===
Transplantation of an AER that would give rise to an arm (or wing, as these experiments are commonly performed on chicken embryos) to a limb field developing into a leg does not produce an arm and leg at the same location, but rather two legs. In contrast, transplantation of cells from the progress zone of a developing arm to replace the progress zone of a developing leg will produce a limb with leg structures proximally (femur, knee) and arm structures distally (hand, fingers). Thus it is the mesodermal cells of the progress zone, not the ectodermal cells of the AER, that control the identity of the limb.

=== AER timing does not specify underlying mesoderm fate ===
AER timing does not regulate the fate specification of the underlying mesoderm, as shown by one set of experiments. When the AER from a late limb bud is transplanted to an earlier limb bud, the limb forms normally. The converse – transplantation of an early limb bud to a late limb bud – also results in normal limb development. However, the underlying mesoderm in the progress zone is fate specified. If progress zone mesoderm is transplanted along with the AER, then additional finger/toes are formed (for an early → late transplantation) or the finger/toes are formed too early (for a late → early transplantation).
