= Zone of polarizing activity =

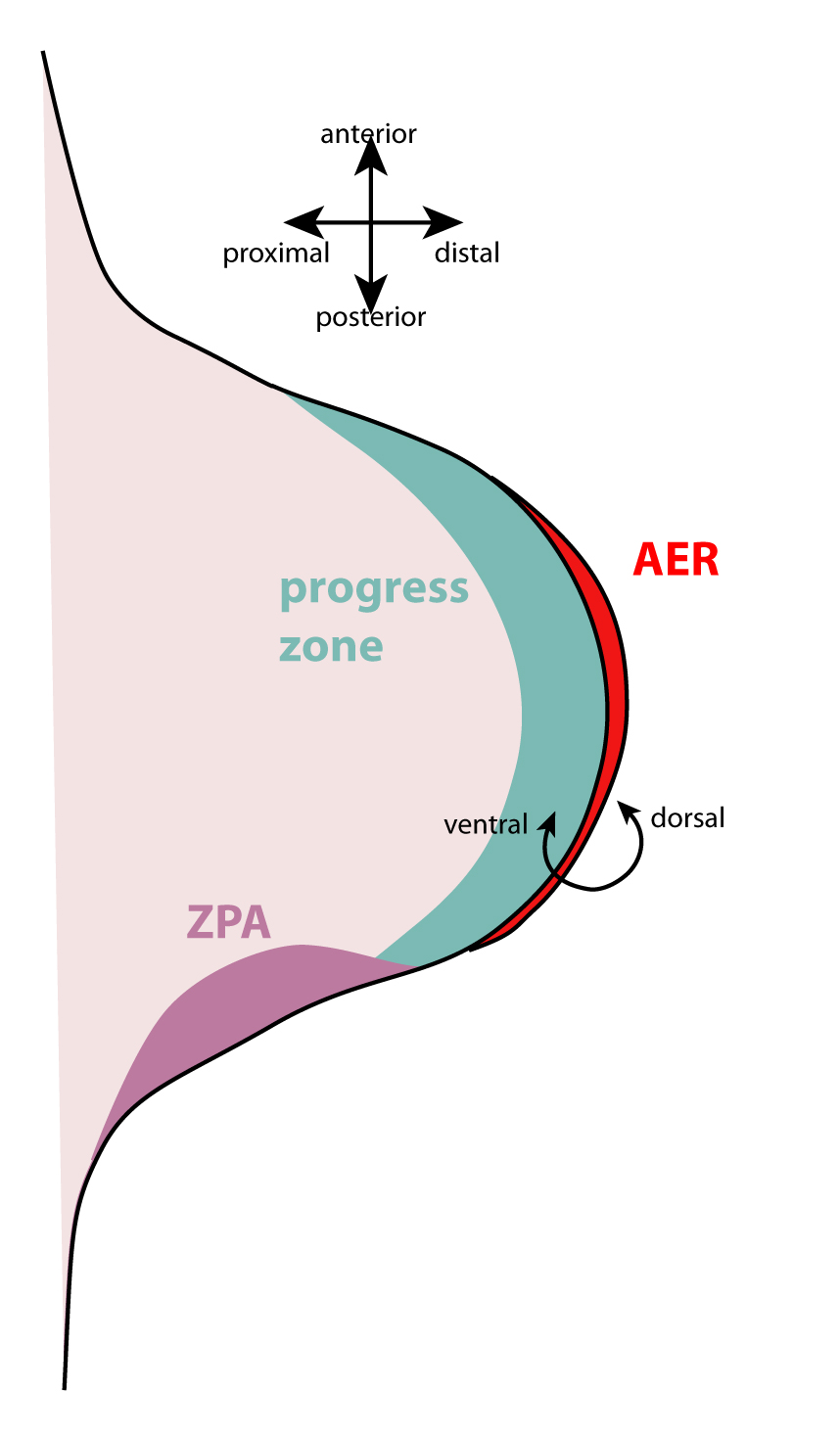
- The apical ectodermal ridge is a thickened epithelium at the most distal end of the limb bud. The zone of polarizing activity is at the posterior part of the limb bud.

Details

Identifiers
- Latin: zona activitatis polarisantis
- Acronym: ZPA
- TE: of polarizing activity_by_E5.0.3.0.0.1.5 E5.0.3.0.0.1.5

The zone of polarizing activity (ZPA) is an area of mesenchyme that contains signals which instruct the developing limb bud to form along the anterior/posterior axis. Limb bud is undifferentiated mesenchyme enclosed by an ectoderm covering. Eventually, the limb bud develops into bones, tendons, muscles and joints. Limb bud development relies not only on the ZPA, but also many different genes, signals, and a unique region of ectoderm called the apical ectodermal ridge (AER). Research by Saunders and Gasseling in 1948 identified the AER and its subsequent involvement in proximal distal outgrowth. Twenty years later, the same group did transplantation studies in chick limb bud and identified the ZPA. In 1993, Todt and Fallon showed that the AER and ZPA are dependent on each other.

== Patterning ==
Patterning along the limb bud requires signals from many sources. Specifically, proteins called transcription factors (TF) help control the rate at which a gene is transcribed. The limb bud expresses a TF called ALX4 at the anterior part of the mesoderm, with the TF HOXB8 being expressed at the posterior portion. The Alx4 region, the medial region, and the Hox8 expressing area meet at a proximal area where the AER develops. The ZPA forms where the Hox8 region joins the AER.

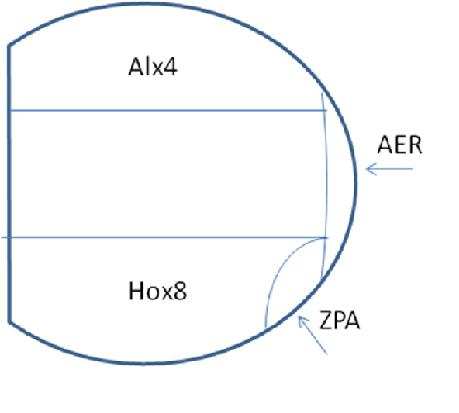

These regions are dependent on signaling in order for the appropriate induction events to occur. The AER expresses FGF8 which induces Shh expression in the posterior mesoderm. Shh then stimulates FGF4 to be expressed in the posterior part of the AER. After these events, there is a co-dependence between FGF-4 and Shh for their subsequent expression and maintenance. Additionally, Wnt7a is expressed in the dorsal ectoderm, is needed to maintain the FGF and Shh signaling.

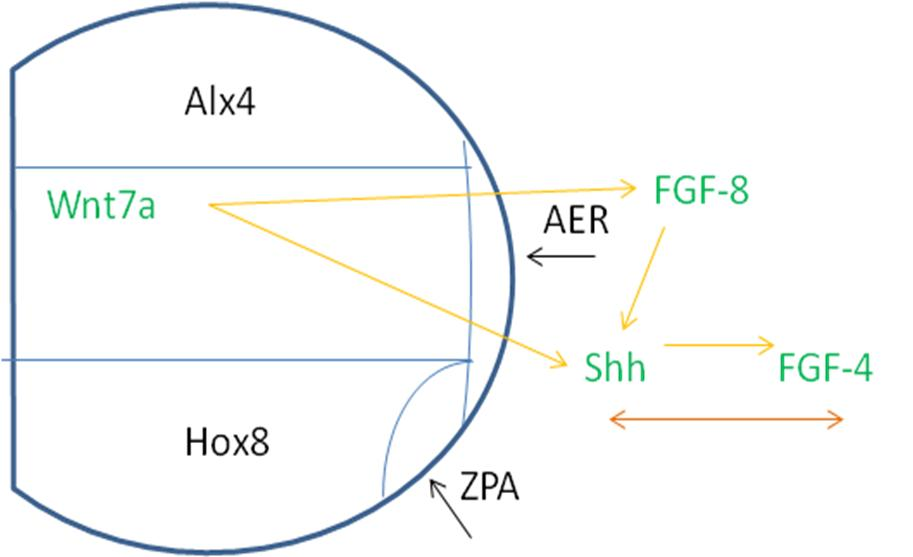

== Apical ectodermal ridge ==
Saunders and Gasseling published data in the Journal of Experimental Biology in 1948, showing that reference marks inserted near the rim of the apical border of the wing bud are dispersed throughout the whole forearm of the wing. This led them to believe that the apical ectoderm may play a role in forming parts of the wing. To test this, they removed apical ectoderm from wing buds which yielded deformed wings. When they removed dorsal ectoderm, normal wings formed. These results showed that the cells of the apical ectoderm have a precise fate to form specific regions of the wing.

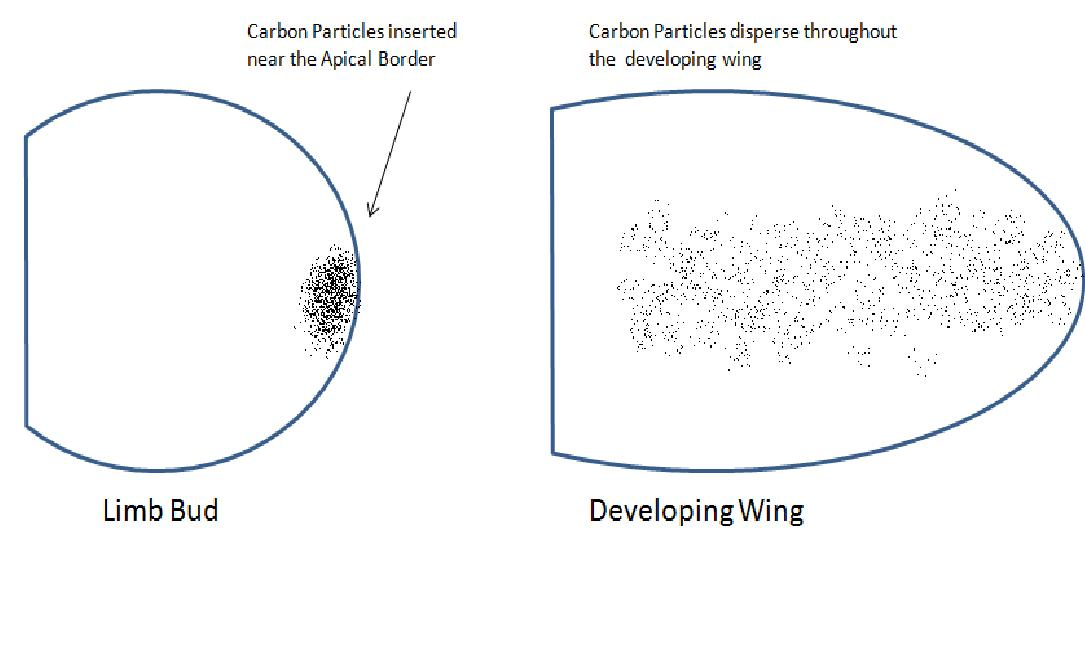

== Sonic hedgehog ==
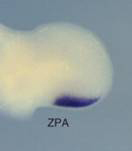
ZPA mouse, right forelimb

In 1968, Saunders and Gasseling did transplantation studies using tissue from chick limb bud. Removing cells from the posterior region of the limb, they transplanted them to the anterior region and noticed that extra digits formed in the anterior area and these digits were mirror images to the normal ones. This posterior mesenchyme was the ZPA, which is now known to express the protein sonic hedgehog (Shh). One hypothesis is that at high concentrations, this unknown morphogen causes mesenchyme to form on the posterior side, while low concentrations induces mesenchyme to form on the anterior end. Identifying this morphogen was the next crucial step. The first hypothesis came from Tickle et al. who showed that when retinoic acid is placed in the anterior margin of the limb bud, mirror image duplications result. However, concentrations of retinoic acid that cause mirror image duplications induce high levels of a downstream gene, retinoic acid receptor Beta, which is not seen in the posterior region. It is now known that endogenous retinoic acid acts permissively prior to limb bud initiation to allow the budding process to begin, and that the specific morphogen, hypothesized to be Shh, is normally expressed independently of retinoic acid in the posterior region of the limb bud. By looking at signaling homologs of other organisms, the segmentation gene of Drosophila, hedgehog, served as a viable candidate.

The idea that Shh is required for proper ZPA signaling and anterior/posterior limb formation needed to be tested. Riddle et al. took Saunders and Gasselings findings to the next step and proved that Shh is the morphogen within the ZPA that is required for anterior posterior patterning. By isolating the Shh gene and implanting it into the anterior limb bud, mirror image digit duplications formed.

Isolation was conducted by designing PCR primers that correspond to sequences of Shh that are conserved in Drosophila and mouse and involved in limb bud formation. The clone was then used as a template to screen a cDNA library from stage 22 limb bud RNA. The group ectopically expressed the gene by taking advantage of a retroviral vector to insert the cDNA into chick cells. There are unique types of this retroviral vector that only infect specific strains of avian species. Therefore, this group used a retroviral vector termed RCAS-E, which lacks a type E envelope protein, and is able to infect certain chick embryo fibroblasts with Shh.

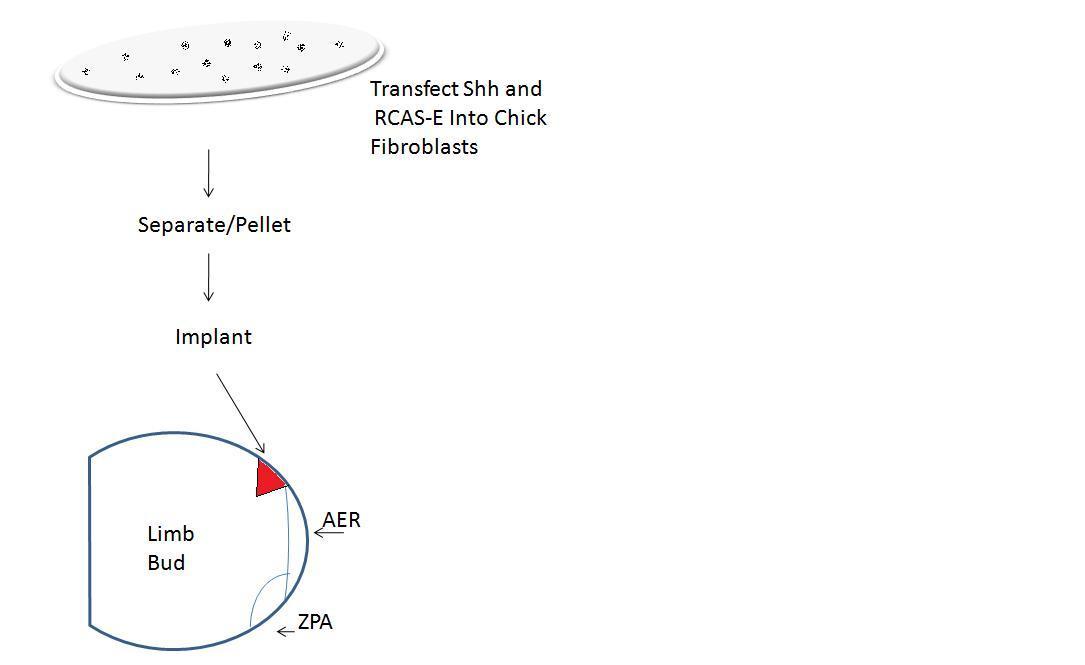

Results showed digit duplications, with the most common being 4-3-3-4, with digit 2 missing. Though there was variability, it was clearly consistent with anterior to posterior positional patterning. Variations were due to the amount of tissue grafted, and the location of the graft. These findings indicate that Shh could substitute for the function of the ZPA. Thus Shh is sufficient for ZPA action.

=== Mediators ===
Shh may be a critical signal regulating ZPA function, but the genes involved in Shh signaling are under the control of several other factors that are needed for ZPA maintenance and function including Hand2 and Hoxb-8. Retinoic acid, an important signaling molecule needed throughout embryogenesis, acts through the Hox genes. It was originally postulated that retinoic acid acts to induce the Hoxb-8 gene, but this hypothesis has not been supported by genetic studies in mouse embryos lacking retinoic acid synthesis that still express Hoxb-8 in the limb. Hoxb-8 signaling is active in the early embryo, beginning at the posterior end of the lateral plate mesoderm and extending to the anterior region. As Hoxb-8 spreads to more anterior regions, Shh is induced in the area that will become the ZPA. Shh is only induced in the anterior region because of signals from the AER. Experiments done by Heikinheimo et al. show that when the AER is removed, beads that express FGF are sufficient to induce Shh signaling in the ZPA. Thus, the likely signaling factor from the AER is FGF.

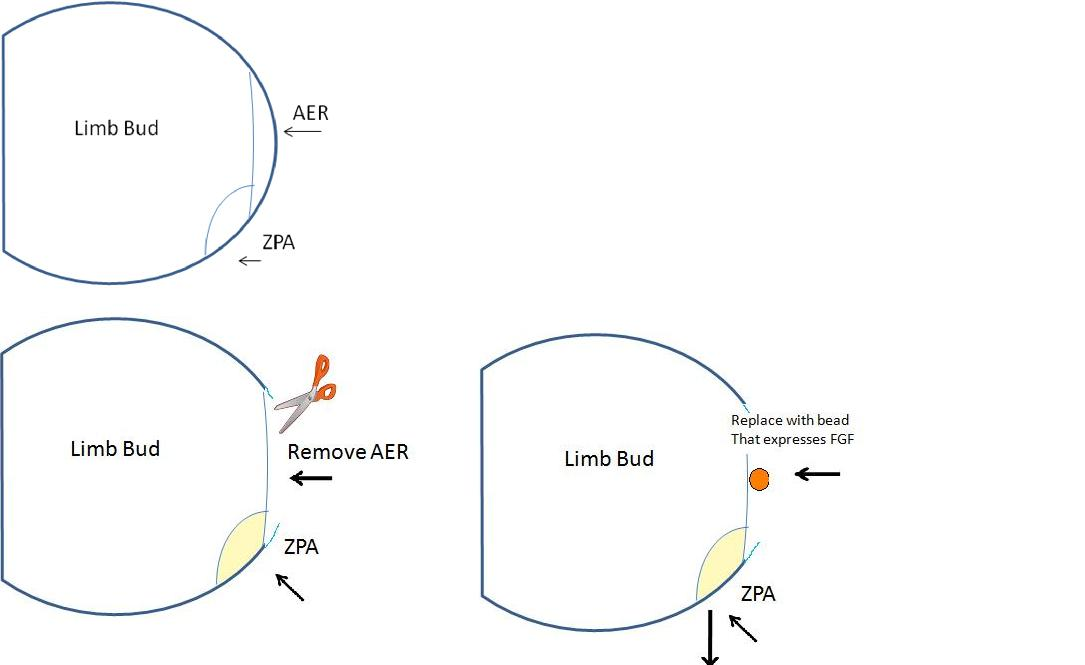

Additionally when the AER is removed, Shh is no longer expressed, and the ZPA can no longer be maintained. Acting in a positive feedback mechanism, FGF-4 is expressed near the ZPA. FGF-4 acts to maintain Shh expression, while Shh acts to maintain FGF-4 expression. At the same time, Wnt-7a is expressed in the dorsal ectoderm, and provides further positive feedback to FGF-4 and Shh. Without this system, limbs and digits are either significantly reduced or missing.

=== Downstream signals ===
The downstream targets that are activated in response to Shh pose another challenge. Genes that are targets of Shh signaling encode factors that lead to the formation of the stylopod, zeugopod and autopod.

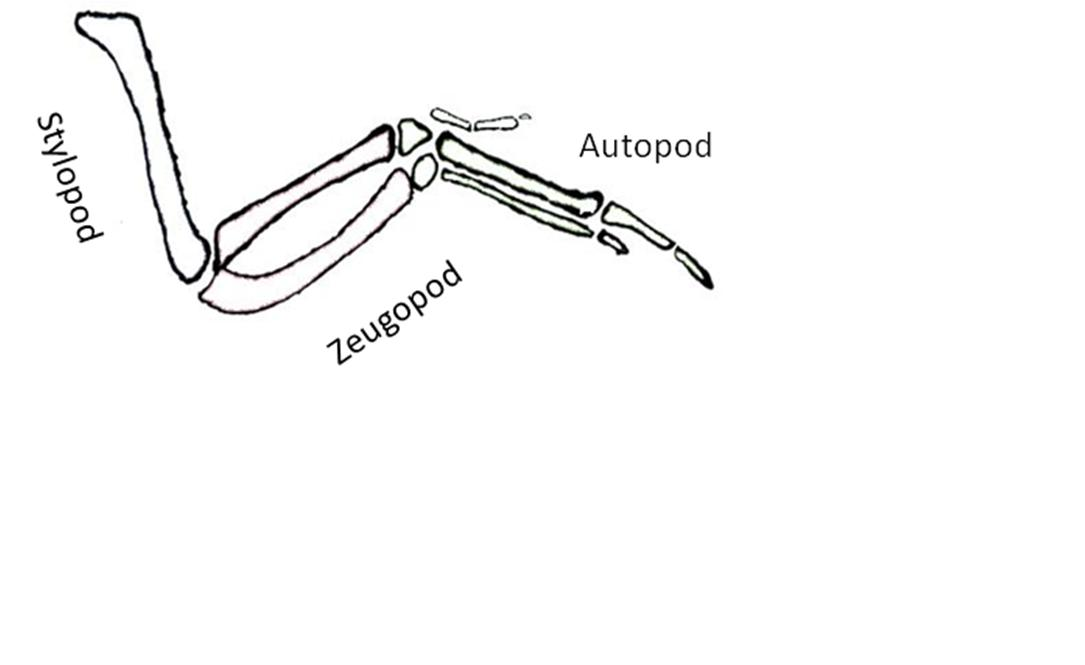

Activation of Gli zinc-finger transcription factors occurs through the Hedgehog signaling pathway. There are three Gli factors that are essential for limb development: Gli1, Gli2 and Gli3. Without Shh, Gli2 and Gli3 are processed to a repressor form and travel to the nucleus to repress the Shh response. But when Shh is present, unprocessed Gli2 and Gli3 are able to pass into the nucleus and stimulate expression of Shh target genes, including Gli1. Studies in mice show that Gli3 knockouts have polydactyly digits. Fundamentally, Shh acts to remove repression of Gli3. When Shh diffuses from the ZPA, it predominates in the posterior region of the limb bud, activating Gli3 in the posterior region, while the repressor is still active in the anterior region. This leads to activation of other genes such as Hox genes, FGF genes and BMP genes in the posterior region, setting up digit patterning. BMP, plays a role in limb morphology, specifically, digit positioning, but the specific regulation of BMP is unclear.

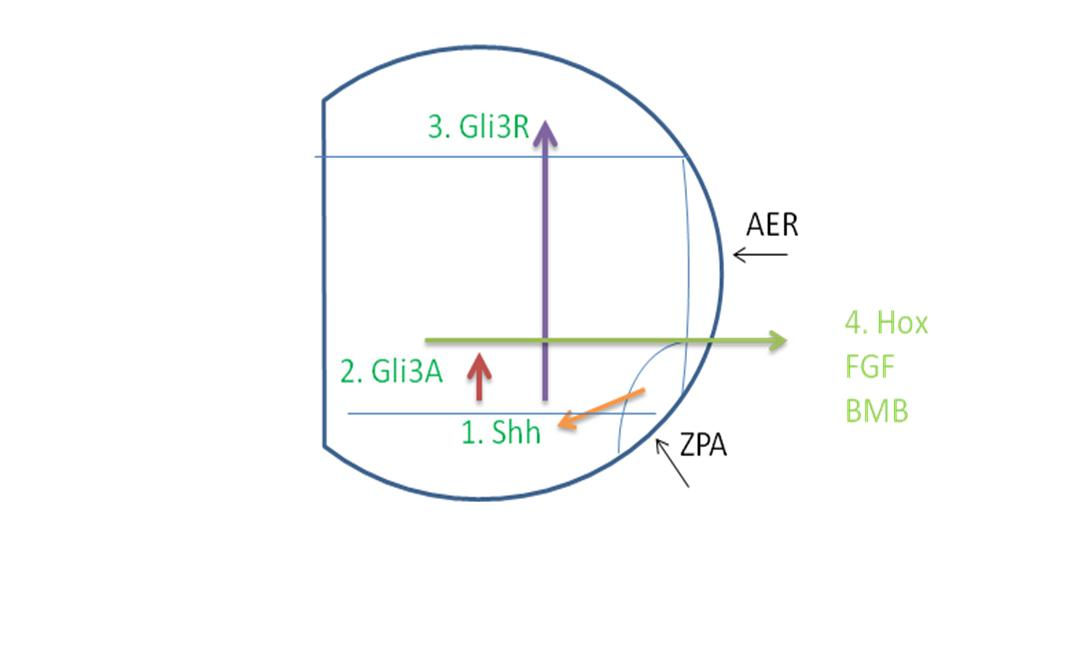

In particular, the Hox genes A and D are likely to be controlled by Shh within the ZPA. Three phases of activation of the Hox genes results in patterning of the limb parallel to the expression of the Hox genes in a nested pattern. Activation of these genes results in a new limb axis that ultimately results in digit development, possibly interpreting gene expression to assign digit identity. Overall, the molecular ZPA requires input for several signaling centers, but acts as an organizer itself, inducing anterior-posterior pattering of the chick limb bud.
