= LBH (gene) =

Protein-coding gene in the species Homo sapiens

Identifiers
- Aliases: LBH, limb bud and heart development, LBH regulator of WNT signaling pathway
- External IDs: OMIM: 611763; MGI: 1925139; GeneCards: LBH

Gene location (Human)
Chr.	Chromosome 2 (human)
Band	2p23.1	Start	30,231,534 bp
Band	2p23.1	End	30,323,730 bp

Gene location (Mouse)
Chr.	Chromosome 17 (mouse)
Band	17|17 E1.3	Start	73,225,300 bp
Band	17|17 E1.3	End	73,248,942 bp
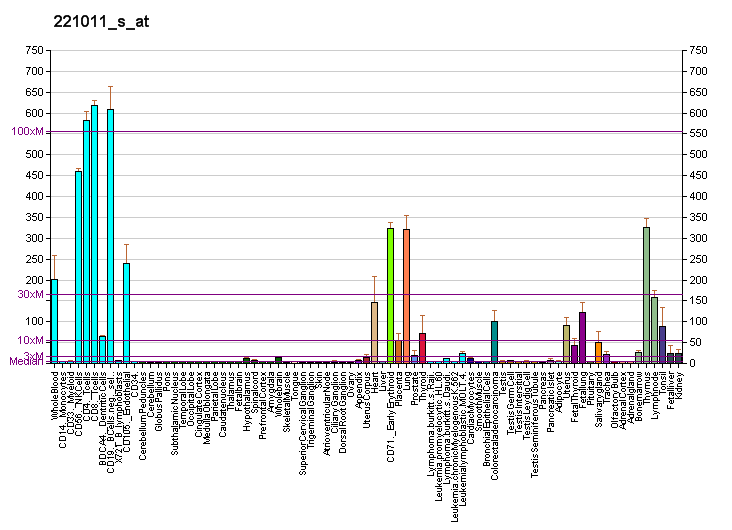
RNA expression pattern
Bgee	Human / Mouse (ortholog); Top expressed in: right lung; granulocyte; upper lobe of left lung; lymph node; ascending aorta; popliteal artery; tibial arteries; left ventricle; visceral pleura; apex of heart / Top expressed in: ascending aorta; aortic valve; Gonadal ridge; molar; mesenteric lymph nodes; myocardium; myocardium of ventricle; habenula; left lung lobe; atrium; More reference expression data
BioGPS	More reference expression data
Gene ontology
Molecular function	protein binding
Cellular component	cytoplasm; nucleus; protein-containing complex
Biological process	multicellular organism development; positive regulation of transcription, DNA-templated; regulation of transcription, DNA-templated; transcription, DNA-templated; mammary gland development; negative regulation of intracellular estrogen receptor signaling pathway; mammary gland epithelial cell differentiation; positive regulation of somatic stem cell population maintenance; positive regulation of somatic stem cell division; positive regulation of mammary stem cell proliferation; negative regulation of stem cell differentiation; regulation of gene expression; regulation of MAPK cascade; negative regulation of transcription, DNA-templated
Sources:Amigo / QuickGO
Orthologs
Databases	NCBI: entry; OMA: entry
Species	Human	Mouse
Entrez	81606	77889
Ensembl	ENSG00000213626	ENSMUSG00000024063
UniProt	Q53QV2	Q9CX60
RefSeq (mRNA)	NM_030915	NM_029999
RefSeq (protein)	NP_112177	NP_084275
Location (UCSC)	Chr 2: 30.23 – 30.32 Mb	Chr 17: 73.23 – 73.25 Mb
PubMed search
- Wikidata
View/Edit Human	View/Edit Mouse

The LBH (Limb Bud-Heart) gene is a highly conserved human gene that produces the LBH protein, a transcription co-factor in the Wnt/β-catenin pathway. Upon transcriptional activation of β-catenin, LBH goes on to act as a regulator of cell proliferation and differentiation through multiple transcriptional targets. The gene is located on the p arm of chromosome 2 and is roughly 28 kb long. Current ongoing studies are examining its role in developmental and oncological settings.

== Gene ==
Located on chromosome 2, the full sequence is 28495 base pairs long. It contains three exons that will be translated to create the final protein product. Currently, there is no identified promoter region. LBH has a high degree of similarity among many vertebrate species. This is most likely evident of its importance in development and stem cell regulation. Interestingly, LBH has no known paralogs, despite its multifunctionality and expression in different tissues at various stages of development.

== Protein ==
The LBH or Limb-Bud and Heart protein is 105 aa long nuclear protein and is highly conserved across vertebrate species. LBH is a disordered, acidic protein. It lacks any globular fold or secondary and tertiary structures, placing it in the class of intrinsically disordered proteins (IDPs). Research is ongoing on how LBHs conformational flexibility affects its role as a transcriptional regulator. IDPs are known to undergo disorder to order transitions in the presence of certain binding partners. Due to LBHs disordered structure, it may experience multi-functionality through the binding to different targets, producing different transcriptional effects.

== Mechanism ==
LBH or Limb-Bud-Heart was first identified in a 2001 study on transcriptional cofactors for limb patterning in mice. LBH was noted for its expression in developing limb buds and heart formation, hence its name. LBH was hypothesized to act as a transcriptional cofactor due to preliminary examinations of its protein structure and composition. LBH was then found to be directly downstream of the canonical Wnt/β-catenin pathway by downregulating the expression of Wnt, preventing signal completion. The Wnt/β-catenin pathway is a highly conserved pathway that is expressed in a variety of tissues and stages. Direct overlap of in vivo expression of Wnt/β-catenin pathway activation and LBH expression during limb bud development gives evidence for a direct interaction between Wnt/β-catenin and LBH.

Recent studies have found that LBH has a significant role in the regulation of stem cell growth and proliferation in mammary glands. LBH induces expression of ΔNp63, a key epithelial stem cell transcription factor, to promote basal MaSC differentiation and proliferation growing the basal mammary gland. This is compared to luminal expansion and differentiation, increasing the movement and differentiation of the basal MaSC cells to the luminal surface. Knockdowns in mice have resulted in reduced mammary gland growth during puberty and pregnancy. Inversely, overexpression has been noted in basal subtype breast cancers, furthering LBHs effect on stem cell regulation.

== Diseases ==
The overexpression of LBH is one of the causal factors for birth defects seen in partial trisomy 2p syndrome, an autosomal disorder that causes multiple congenital defects. Partial trisomy 2p patients have a triplication of the p arm of chromosome 2. Transgenic overexpression in mice of the LBH ortholog, Lbh, causes the continued overexpression and downregulation of multiple targets downstream of Lbh, mimicking symptoms of congenital heart disease (CHD) and skeletal defects seen in partial trisomy 2p patients. In addition to this, Lbh overexpression leads to the repression of Nkx2.5 and Tbx5, important regulators in cardiogenesis in developing embryos. The importance of LBH in cardiogenesis is evident of LBHs multifunctionality despite being highly conserved and having no paralogs.

LBH also has an important oncological role in the development of mammary gland tumors. LBH has been noted for its overexpression in aggressive “basal” subtype breast cancers. Studies examining the role of Lbh in tumorigenesis in MMTV-Wnt1 transgenic mice as a model for Wnt induced breast cancer development. Lbh was conditionally deactivated in these transgenic mice, significantly delaying tumor onset and resulted in decreased differentiation and proliferation while also increasing apoptosis.
