= Lactase-phlorizin hydrolase =

Lactase-phlorizin hydrolase may refer to:

- Phloretin hydrolase, an enzyme
- Glycosylceramidase, an enzyme
