= Progress zone =

The progress zone is a layer of mesodermal cells immediately beneath the apical ectodermal ridge in the developing limb bud. The fate of the mesodermal cells is thought to be patterned by the length of time spent in the progress zone during limb outgrowth. However, some recent evidence using microinjected embryos suggests that the cells are prespecified early in limb bud development.

The progress zone acts as positional information to tell which cells to develop into the limb. If cells spend a very short time in this area as they receive signals from the apical ectodermal ridge, then more proximal limb structures are not able to develop even if distal ones can.
