= HOXC11 =

Protein-coding gene in the species Homo sapiens

Identifiers
- Aliases: HOXC11, HOX3H, homeobox C11
- External IDs: OMIM: 605559; MGI: 96193; GeneCards: HOXC11

Gene location (Human)
Chr.	Chromosome 12 (human)
Band	12q13.13	Start	53,973,126 bp
Band	12q13.13	End	53,977,643 bp

Gene location (Mouse)
Chr.	Chromosome 15 (mouse)
Band	15 F3|15 58.02 cM	Start	102,862,862 bp
Band	15 F3|15 58.02 cM	End	102,866,143 bp
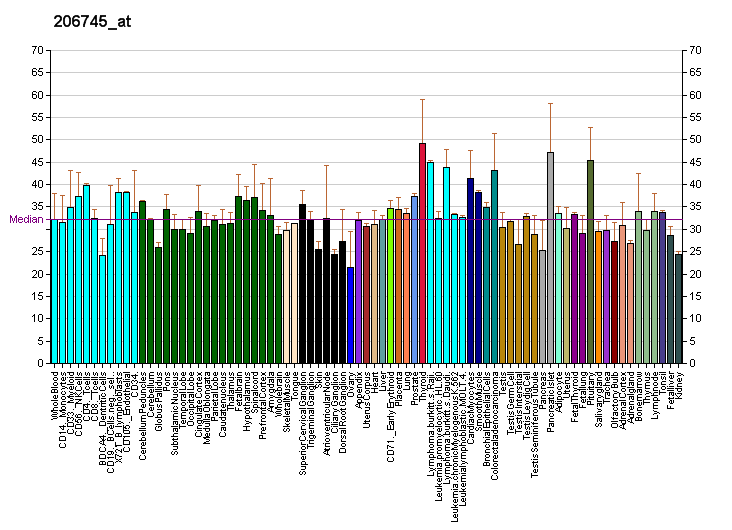
RNA expression pattern
Bgee	Human / Mouse (ortholog); Top expressed in: testicle; skin of leg; popliteal artery; tibial arteries; skin of abdomen; saphenous vein; lower limb muscles; muscle of leg; gastrocnemius muscle; subcutaneous adipose tissue / Top expressed in: tail of embryo; paramesonephric duct; male urethra; muscle tissue; skeletal muscle tissue; muscle of thigh; genital tubercle; quadriceps femoris muscle; embryo; mesonephric duct; More reference expression data
BioGPS	More reference expression data
Gene ontology
Molecular function	RNA polymerase II cis-regulatory region sequence-specific DNA binding; DNA binding; sequence-specific DNA binding; DNA-binding transcription activator activity, RNA polymerase II-specific; DNA-binding transcription factor activity, RNA polymerase II-specific
Cellular component	nucleus; nucleoplasm; cytosol
Biological process	multicellular organism development; embryonic skeletal joint morphogenesis; skeletal system development; proximal/distal pattern formation; embryonic digit morphogenesis; endoderm development; metanephros development; regulation of transcription, DNA-templated; organ induction; anterior/posterior pattern specification; positive regulation of transcription by RNA polymerase II; transcription, DNA-templated; transcription by RNA polymerase II
Sources:Amigo / QuickGO
Orthologs
Databases	NCBI: entry; OMA: entry
Species	Human	Mouse
Entrez	3227	109663
Ensembl	ENSG00000123388	ENSMUSG00000001656
UniProt	O43248	P31313
RefSeq (mRNA)	NM_014212	NM_001024842
RefSeq (protein)	NP_055027	NP_001020013
Location (UCSC)	Chr 12: 53.97 – 53.98 Mb	Chr 15: 102.86 – 102.87 Mb
PubMed search
- Wikidata
View/Edit Human	View/Edit Mouse

Homeobox protein Hox-C11 is a protein that in humans is encoded by the HOXC11 gene.

This gene belongs to the homeobox family of genes. The homeobox genes encode a highly conserved family of transcription factors that play an important role in morphogenesis in all multicellular organisms.

Mammals possess four similar homeobox gene clusters, HOXA, HOXB, HOXC and HOXD, which are located on different chromosomes and consist of 9 to 11 genes arranged in tandem. This gene is one of several homeobox HOXC genes located in a cluster on chromosome 12. The product of this gene binds to a promoter element of the lactase-phlorizin hydrolase. It also may play a role in early intestinal development. An alternatively spliced variant encoding a shorter isoform has been described but its full-length nature has not been determined.
