= WNT3A =

Protein-coding gene in humans

Identifiers
- Aliases: WNT3A, Wnt family member 3A
- External IDs: OMIM: 606359; MGI: 98956; GeneCards: WNT3A

Gene location (Human)
Chr.	Chromosome 1 (human)
Band	1q42.13	Start	228,006,998 bp
Band	1q42.13	End	228,061,271 bp

Gene location (Mouse)
Chr.	Chromosome 11 (mouse)
Band	11 B1.3|11 37.17 cM	Start	59,138,859 bp
Band	11 B1.3|11 37.17 cM	End	59,181,578 bp
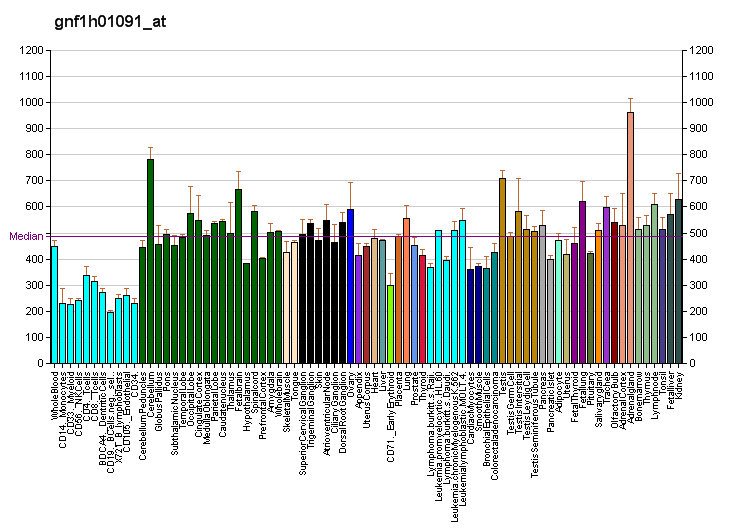
RNA expression pattern
Bgee	Human / Mouse (ortholog); Top expressed in: placenta; right lung; upper lobe of left lung; olfactory zone of nasal mucosa; skin of leg; skin of abdomen; mucosa of esophagus; salivary gland; minor salivary glands; prostate / Top expressed in: urethra; male urethra; epithelium of male urethra; ejaculatory duct; female urethra; vagina; muscle layer of seminal vesicle; prostatic epithelium; muscle layer of urethra; primitive streak; More reference expression data
BioGPS	More reference expression data
Gene ontology
Molecular function	protein domain specific binding; signaling receptor binding; co-receptor binding; frizzled binding; protein binding; transcription coactivator activity; receptor ligand activity
Cellular component	endocytic vesicle membrane; endoplasmic reticulum lumen; extracellular region; cell surface; extracellular exosome; Wnt-Frizzled-LRP5/6 complex; early endosome membrane; plasma membrane; Golgi lumen; presynapse; extracellular space; synapse; glutamatergic synapse
Biological process	somitogenesis; cellular response to retinoic acid; hemopoiesis; positive regulation of protein phosphorylation; Wnt signaling pathway involved in forebrain neuroblast division; positive regulation of skeletal muscle tissue development; positive regulation of receptor internalization; axis elongation involved in somitogenesis; positive regulation of collateral sprouting in absence of injury; mammary gland development; platelet activation; heart looping; positive regulation of cysteine-type endopeptidase activity involved in apoptotic process; positive regulation of protein localization to plasma membrane; cardiac muscle cell fate commitment; mesoderm development; cell proliferation in forebrain; positive regulation of mesodermal cell fate specification; negative regulation of fat cell differentiation; canonical Wnt signaling pathway involved in cardiac muscle cell fate commitment; regulation of microtubule cytoskeleton organization; negative regulation of dopaminergic neuron differentiation; cell proliferation in midbrain; in utero embryonic development; negative regulation of axon extension involved in axon guidance; positive regulation of peptidyl-serine phosphorylation; positive regulation of transcription, DNA-templated; regulation of axonogenesis; positive regulation of B cell proliferation; post-anal tail morphogenesis; positive regulation of cardiac muscle cell differentiation; negative regulation of neuron projection development; paraxial mesodermal cell fate commitment; negative regulation of neurogenesis; positive regulation of protein tyrosine kinase activity; positive regulation of DNA-binding transcription factor activity; extracellular matrix organization; positive regulation of neural precursor cell proliferation; synaptic vesicle recycling; osteoblast differentiation; skeletal muscle cell differentiation; COP9 signalosome assembly; dorsal/ventral neural tube patterning; positive regulation of protein binding; platelet aggregation; midbrain development; positive regulation of protein kinase activity; positive regulation of cell-cell adhesion mediated by cadherin; positive regulation of hepatocyte proliferation; neurogenesis; spinal cord association neuron differentiation; axonogenesis; positive regulation of cytokine production; positive regulation of dermatome development; somatic stem cell division; positive regulation of canonical Wnt signaling pathway involved in controlling type B pancreatic cell proliferation; axon guidance; multicellular organism development; determination of left/right symmetry; inner ear morphogenesis; positive regulation of cell population proliferation; regulation of cell differentiation; hippocampus development; negative regulation of heart induction by canonical Wnt signaling pathway; positive regulation of transcription by RNA polymerase II; anterior/posterior pattern specification; Wnt signaling pathway involved in midbrain dopaminergic neuron differentiation; beta-catenin destruction complex disassembly; neuron differentiation; Wnt signaling pathway; positive regulation of canonical Wnt signaling pathway; positive regulation of gene expression; calcium ion transmembrane transport via low voltage-gated calcium channel; presynapse assembly; negative regulation of neuron death; positive regulation of core promoter binding; regulation of RNA biosynthetic process; regulation of signaling receptor activity; cell population proliferation; canonical Wnt signaling pathway; secondary palate development; cell fate commitment; modulation of chemical synaptic transmission; regulation of synapse organization; postsynapse to nucleus signaling pathway; regulation of presynapse assembly
Sources:Amigo / QuickGO
Orthologs
Databases	NCBI: entry; OMA: entry
Species	Human	Mouse
Entrez	89780	22416
Ensembl	ENSG00000154342	ENSMUSG00000009900
UniProt	P56704	P27467
RefSeq (mRNA)	NM_033131	NM_009522
RefSeq (protein)	NP_149122	NP_033548
Location (UCSC)	Chr 1: 228.01 – 228.06 Mb	Chr 11: 59.14 – 59.18 Mb
PubMed search
- Wikidata
View/Edit Human	View/Edit Mouse

Protein Wnt-3a is a protein that in humans is encoded by the WNT3A gene.

The WNT gene family consists of structurally related genes that encode secreted signaling proteins. These proteins have are critical in tissue homeostasis, embryonic development, and disease.

== Signaling and related genes ==
WNT3A is highly related to the WNT3 gene in sequence and protein function. WNT3A and WNT3 signal similarly through primarily the beta-catenin/Tcf pathway. WNT3A is located in the genome beside the WNT9A gene across many vertebrates. Similarly, the WNT3 gene occurs in the genome beside the WNT9B gene. WNT9A and WNT9B signal through the beta-catenin/Tcf pathway but do not play related roles as WNT3A and WNT3 in the same cellular processes.

== Role in disease ==
WNT3A is not linked to particular genetic disorder in humans. Mice that have a genetic mutation in the WNT3A die during early embryogenesis and fail to correctly form axial tissues. Rodent Wnt3a promotes the beta-catenin/Tcf pathway which is tumor inducing and can cause cancer when expressed in particular cell populations.

== Role in embryonic development ==
Embryonic development is the process where the body plan is created. From studies in vertebrate model systems we can infer the roles of particular genes in human anatomical structures. Wnt3a plays a role in these processes:

=== Body plan - Torso ===
Wnt3A patterns a multipotent stem cell population that form neurons, muscles, bones, and cartilage of the torso region. Wnt3a instructs these multipotent stems cells to form muscle, bone, and cartilage progenitors over forming neurons. Wnt3A also regulates the Notch pathway to control the segmentation clock needed for normal torso development.

=== Left-right patterning ===
Wnt3a is in a signaling pathway that activates the gene Nodal which is left side signaling determinant.

=== Intestine - Colon ===
The colon portion of the gastrointestinal tract is completely dependent on Wnt3a and Wnt3a selectively causes the growth of colon progenitors.

=== Neural crest ===
Wnt3a expands neural crest cells during early development.

=== Blood cells ===
Wnt3a promotes hematopoietic stem cell self-renewal. Wnt3a is needed for myeloid but not B-lymphoid development at the progenitor level, and affected immature thymocyte differentiation.

=== Brain - Hippocampus ===
Wnt3a is needed for formation of the hippocampus portion of the brain.

=== Teeth ===
Wnt3a promotes stem cell properties of dental pulp stem cells.
