= WNT2B =

Protein-coding gene in humans

Identifiers
- Aliases: WNT2B, WNT13, Wnt family member 2B
- External IDs: OMIM: 601968; MGI: 1261834; GeneCards: WNT2B

Gene location (Human)
Chr.	Chromosome 1 (human)
Band	1p13.2	Start	112,466,541 bp
Band	1p13.2	End	112,530,165 bp

Gene location (Mouse)
Chr.	Chromosome 3 (mouse)
Band	3 F2.2|3 45.88 cM	Start	104,852,588 bp
Band	3 F2.2|3 45.88 cM	End	104,869,237 bp
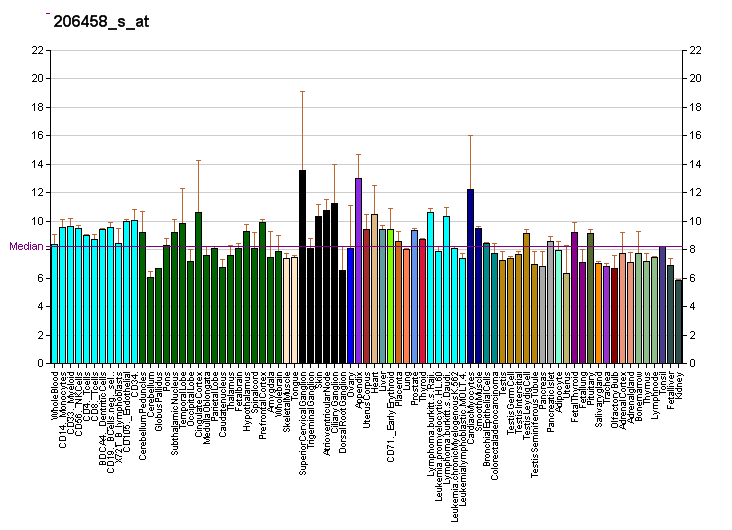

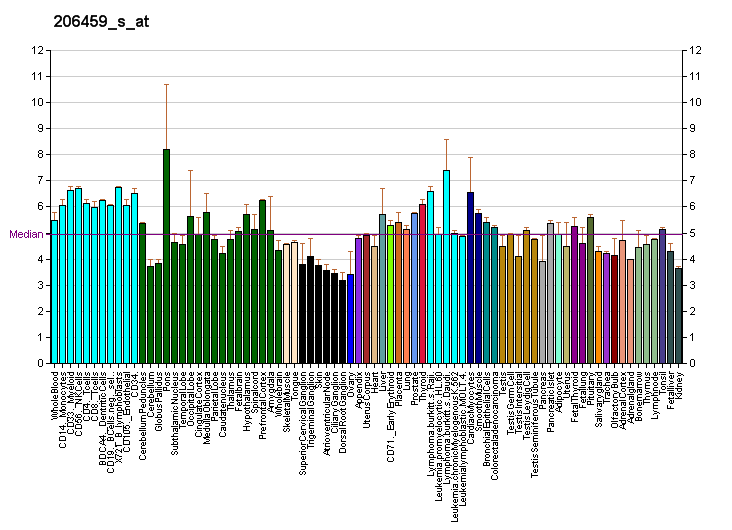
RNA expression pattern
Bgee	Human / Mouse (ortholog); Top expressed in: germinal epithelium; buccal mucosa cell; parietal pleura; gonad; skin of hip; optic nerve; skin of thigh; epithelium of colon; right ovary; left ovary / Top expressed in: epithelium of female urethra; muscle layer of urethra; pretectal area; muscle layer of ejaculatory duct; lamina propria of urethra; vagina; anterior lobe of prostate; lamina propria of vagina; pelvic part of vagina; muscle layer of seminal vesicle; More reference expression data
BioGPS	More reference expression data
Gene ontology
Molecular function	frizzled binding; signaling receptor binding
Cellular component	extracellular region; extracellular space; intracellular membrane-bounded organelle; collagen-containing extracellular matrix
Biological process	cell fate commitment; positive regulation of branching involved in ureteric bud morphogenesis; male gonad development; chondrocyte differentiation; positive regulation of canonical Wnt signaling pathway; iris morphogenesis; cornea development in camera-type eye; cellular response to starvation; hematopoietic stem cell proliferation; lung induction; multicellular organism development; forebrain regionalization; lens development in camera-type eye; neuron differentiation; mesenchymal-epithelial cell signaling; canonical Wnt signaling pathway; Wnt signaling pathway
Sources:Amigo / QuickGO
Orthologs
Databases	NCBI: entry; OMA: entry
Species	Human	Mouse
Entrez	7482	22414
Ensembl	ENSG00000134245	ENSMUSG00000027840
UniProt	Q93097	O70283
RefSeq (mRNA)	NM_024494; NM_001291880; NM_004185	NM_009520
RefSeq (protein)	NP_001278809; NP_004176; NP_078613	NP_033546
Location (UCSC)	Chr 1: 112.47 – 112.53 Mb	Chr 3: 104.85 – 104.87 Mb
PubMed search
- Wikidata
View/Edit Human	View/Edit Mouse

Protein Wnt-2b (formerly Wnt13) is a protein that in humans is encoded by the WNT2B gene.

This gene encodes a member of the wingless-type MMTV integration site (WNT) family of highly conserved, secreted signaling factors. WNT family members function in a variety of developmental processes including regulation of cell growth and differentiation and are characterized by a WNT-core domain. This gene may play a role in human development as well as human carcinogenesis. This gene produces two alternative transcript variants.
