= FGF10 =

Protein-coding gene in humans

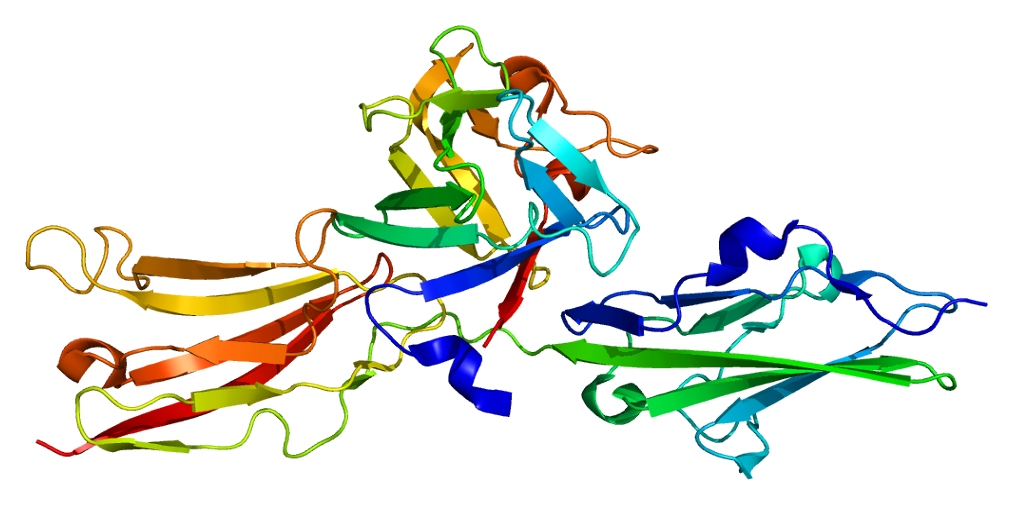

Identifiers
- Aliases: FGF10, fibroblast growth factor 10
- External IDs: OMIM: 602115; MGI: 1099809; GeneCards: FGF10
Available structures
| PDB | Ortholog search: PDBe RCSB |
| PDB | List of PDB id codes 1NUN |

Gene location (Human)
| Chr. | Chromosome 5 (human) |
| Band | 5p12 | Start | 44,300,247 bp |
| Band | 5p12 | End | 44,389,706 bp |

Gene location (Mouse)
| Chr. | Chromosome 13 (mouse) |
| Band | 13 D2.3|13 67.14 cM | Start | 118,806,327 bp |
| Band | 13 D2.3|13 67.14 cM | End | 118,928,651 bp |
RNA expression pattern
| Bgee | Human / Mouse (ortholog); Top expressed in: buccal mucosa cell; synovial joint; canal of the cervix; ectocervix; synovial membrane; left uterine tube; vagina; gastric mucosa; caput epididymis; muscle layer of sigmoid colon / Top expressed in: otic pit; muscle layer of seminal vesicle; hair; lamina propria of vagina; spermatid; dentate gyrus of hippocampal formation granule cell; pituitary stalk; zygote; primordial pancreas; embryo; More reference expression data |
| BioGPS | n/a |
Gene ontology
| Molecular function | heparin binding; type 2 fibroblast growth factor receptor binding; growth factor activity; protein binding; fibroblast growth factor receptor binding; chemoattractant activity; protein tyrosine kinase activity; 1-phosphatidylinositol-3-kinase activity; phosphatidylinositol-4,5-bisphosphate 3-kinase activity |
| Cellular component | extracellular region; nucleus; cell surface; extracellular matrix; plasma membrane; extracellular space; collagen-containing extracellular matrix |
| Biological process | bud outgrowth involved in lung branching; limb bud formation; organ growth; semicircular canal morphogenesis; embryonic pattern specification; bud elongation involved in lung branching; positive regulation of canonical Wnt signaling pathway; muscle cell fate commitment; tear secretion; positive regulation of Ras protein signal transduction; positive regulation of urothelial cell proliferation; regulation of branching involved in salivary gland morphogenesis by mesenchymal-epithelial signaling; limb development; radial glial cell differentiation; female genitalia morphogenesis; mesonephros development; odontogenesis of dentin-containing tooth; prostatic bud formation; blood vessel remodeling; regulation of saliva secretion; angiogenesis; establishment of mitotic spindle orientation; positive regulation of ERK1 and ERK2 cascade; embryonic digestive tract morphogenesis; animal organ morphogenesis; hair follicle morphogenesis; metanephros development; lung saccule development; lung epithelium development; positive regulation of Notch signaling pathway; negative regulation of cell population proliferation; branch elongation involved in salivary gland morphogenesis; branching involved in salivary gland morphogenesis; positive regulation of white fat cell proliferation; bronchiole morphogenesis; limb morphogenesis; blood vessel morphogenesis; lung development; thymus development; positive regulation of fibroblast proliferation; negative regulation of cell differentiation; ERK1 and ERK2 cascade; positive regulation of epithelial cell migration; positive regulation of mitotic cell cycle; spleen development; smooth muscle cell differentiation; positive regulation of transcription, DNA-templated; positive regulation of Wnt signaling pathway; Harderian gland development; protein localization to cell surface; respiratory system development; epidermis development; positive regulation of peptidyl-tyrosine phosphorylation; metanephros morphogenesis; pancreas development; mammary gland bud formation; positive chemotaxis; mesenchymal-epithelial cell signaling involved in lung development; positive regulation of hair follicle cell proliferation; lacrimal gland development; positive regulation of MAPK cascade; cell differentiation; positive regulation of keratinocyte proliferation; positive regulation of ATP-dependent activity; positive regulation of epithelial cell proliferation involved in wound healing; epithelial cell differentiation; organ induction; positive regulation of epithelial cell proliferation; epidermis morphogenesis; wound healing; epithelial cell proliferation; regulation of activin receptor signaling pathway; positive regulation of DNA replication; chemotaxis; embryonic genitalia morphogenesis; salivary gland development; positive regulation of keratinocyte migration; response to lipopolysaccharide; thyroid gland development; keratinocyte proliferation; semicircular canal fusion; mammary gland specification; epithelial cell migration; white fat cell differentiation; regulation of gene expression; lung alveolus development; branching morphogenesis of an epithelial tube; embryonic digestive tract development; lung proximal/distal axis specification; fibroblast growth factor receptor signaling pathway involved in mammary gland specification; actin cytoskeleton reorganization; positive regulation of vascular endothelial growth factor receptor signaling pathway; pituitary gland development; response to estradiol; secretion by lung epithelial cell involved in lung growth; mesenchymal cell differentiation involved in lung development; lung morphogenesis; response to organic cyclic compound; somatic stem cell population maintenance; tissue regeneration; otic vesicle formation; epithelial cell proliferation involved in salivary gland morphogenesis; cell-cell signaling; male genitalia morphogenesis; positive regulation of DNA repair; salivary gland morphogenesis; MAPK cascade; embryonic camera-type eye development; induction of positive chemotaxis; urothelial cell proliferation; animal organ formation; fibroblast growth factor receptor signaling pathway; regulation of smoothened signaling pathway; determination of left/right symmetry; inner ear morphogenesis; positive regulation of cell population proliferation; submandibular salivary gland formation; type II pneumocyte differentiation; negative regulation of extrinsic apoptotic signaling pathway in absence of ligand; digestive tract development; regulation of epithelial cell proliferation; epithelial tube branching involved in lung morphogenesis; positive regulation of lymphocyte proliferation; positive regulation of transcription by RNA polymerase II; phosphatidylinositol phosphate biosynthetic process; phosphatidylinositol-3-phosphate biosynthetic process; peptidyl-tyrosine phosphorylation; regulation of signaling receptor activity; positive regulation of protein kinase B signaling; positive regulation of G1/S transition of mitotic cell cycle |
Sources:Amigo / QuickGO
Orthologs
| Databases | NCBI: entry; OMA: entry |
| Species | Human | Mouse |
| Entrez | 2255 | 14165 |
| Ensembl | ENSG00000070193 | ENSMUSG00000021732 |
| UniProt | O15520 | O35565 |
| RefSeq (mRNA) | NM_004465 | NM_008002 |
| RefSeq (protein) | NP_004456 | NP_032028 |
| Location (UCSC) | Chr 5: 44.3 – 44.39 Mb | Chr 13: 118.81 – 118.93 Mb |
| PubMed search |
- Wikidata
| View/Edit Human | View/Edit Mouse |

Fibroblast growth factor 10 is a protein that in humans is encoded by the FGF10 gene. It is a polypeptide of 208 amino acids. Human FGF10 gene is highly homologous (95.6%) to rat FGF10, where it was first discovered.

== Structure ==
Fibroblast growth factor 10 is a secreted FGF-family ligand whose mature, receptor-binding region comprises a single conserved FGF domain. Its tertiary structure is a beta trefoil fold consisting of twelve antiparallel β-strands organized into three trefoil-like subdomains resulting in a globular core with approximate threefold pseudosymmetry. The intervening loops provide surfaces for binding to heparan-sulfate and FGFR2b. The N-terminal region is conformationally flexible but can form an α-helix upon receptor binding. FGF10 is primarily monomeric in solution, but it can undergo homodimerization. Heparin promotes assembly of the signalling complex in which two FGF10–FGFR2b protomers form a functional 2:2 receptor dimer.

The FGF10 protein is considered highly thermodynamically unstable, with a half-life <30 min in tissue culture media. Consequently, it has been proposed as the most unstable member of the FGF family. Site-directed mutagenesis has generated an FGF10 variant that is stable in culture media beyond 1 week.

== Function ==
The protein encoded by this gene is a member of the fibroblast growth factor (FGF) family. FGF family members possess broad mitogenic and cell survival activities, and are involved in a variety of biological processes, including embryonic development, cell growth, morphogenesis, tissue repair, tumor growth and invasion. Fibroblast growth factor 10 is a paracrine signaling molecule seen first in the limb bud and organogenesis development. FGF10 starts the developing of limbs and is involved in the branching of morphogenesis in multiple organs such as the lungs, skin, ear and salivary glands. During limb development Tbx4/Tbx5 stimulate the production of FGF10 in the lateral plate mesoderm where it will create an epithelial-mesenchymal FGF signal with FGF8. This positive feedback loop will increase the amount of mesenchyme resulting in a bulge. Afterwards, FGF10 will induce the formation of apical ectodermal ridge (AER) where the feet and hands will be formed. Lung development uses the same epithelial-mesenchymal signaling from FGF10 in the foregut mesenchyme with FGFR2 in the foregut epithelium. FGF10 signaling is required for epithelial branching. Therefore, all branching morphogen organs such as the lungs, skin, ear and salivary glands required the constant expression of FGF10. This protein exhibits mitogenic activity for keratinizing epidermal cells, but essentially no activity for fibroblasts, which is similar to the biological activity of FGF7.

== Clinical significance ==
Nonsense mutations may also occur with the absence of FGF10 such as LADD and ALSG syndrome. Nevertheless, complications may arise from FGF10 signaling such as pancreatic and breast cancer. Moreover, studies have identified variants near the FGF10 locus as a genetic risk factor for breast cancer susceptibility. Although this gene is also implicated to be a primary factor in the process of wound healing. Heterozygous FGF10 variants and childhood intestinal lung disease (child) linked to potential early lethal outcomes. Also, FGF10 variants have been associated with abnormal epithelial repair. FGF10 haploinsufficiency has been shown to increase the risk of chronic‐obstructive pulmonary disease (COPD). Individuals with haploinsufficiency for FGF10 have significantly reduced Tiffeneau index, resembling chronic restrictive and obstructive pulmonary disease.

== Animal studies ==
FGF10 knockout mice die right after birth. The mice showed no developing organs such as lungs, salivary glands, kidney or definitive limbs once autopsied. Studies of the mouse homolog suggested that this gene is required for embryonic epidermal morphogenesis including brain development, lung morphogenesis, and initiation of limb bud formation. FGF knockout mice also have impaired epicardial cell expansion following neonatal heart injury, as well as reduced expression of epicardial markers Wt1 and Tbx18, and mesenchymal markers such as Snai1, Twist1, and Postn. Mice deficient in FGF10 fail to develop normal mammary glands. Guinea Pig model has shown that the FGF10 monoclonal antibody can decrease the number of inflammatory cells in the dermis and its inhibitory effect on inflammatory cells is like that of hydrocortisone butyrate.

== Interactions ==
FGF10 has been shown to interact with Heparan sulfate and Toll-like receptors.

== See also ==
- Turtle shell
