= FGF4 =

Fibroblast growth factor gene

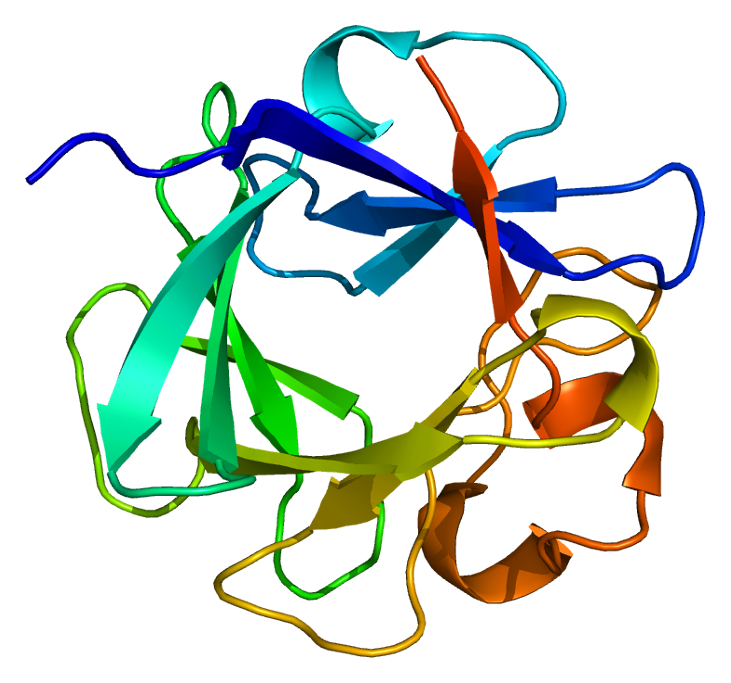

Identifiers
- Aliases: FGF4, HBGF-4, HST, HST-1, HSTF1, K-FGF, KFGF, fibroblast growth factor 4, HSTF-1, FGF-4
- External IDs: OMIM: 164980; MGI: 95518; GeneCards: FGF4
Available structures
PDB	Ortholog search: PDBe RCSB
PDB	List of PDB id codes 1IJT

Gene location (Human)
Chr.	Chromosome 11 (human)
Band	11q13.3	Start	69,771,022 bp
Band	11q13.3	End	69,775,341 bp

Gene location (Mouse)
Chr.	Chromosome 7 (mouse)
Band	7 F5|7 88.88 cM	Start	144,401,104 bp
Band	7 F5|7 88.88 cM	End	144,418,980 bp
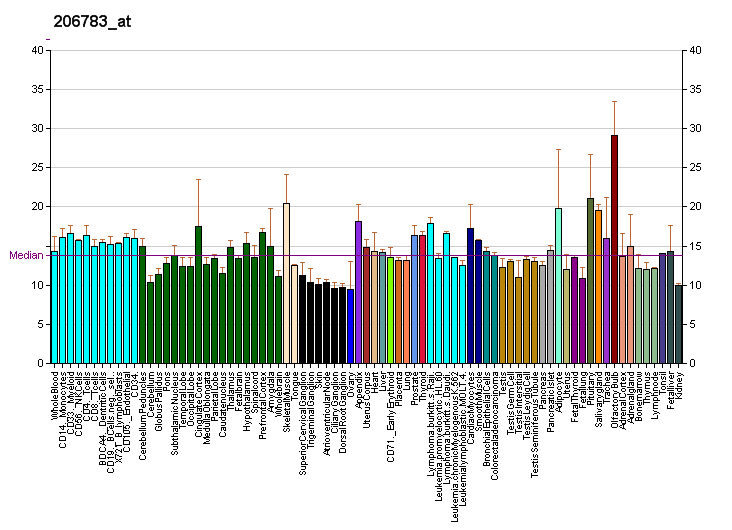
RNA expression pattern
Bgee	Human / Mouse (ortholog); Top expressed in: testicle; gonad; olfactory bulb; tibialis anterior muscle; tibial nerve; skin of thigh; trigeminal ganglion; spinal ganglia; skin of hip; fundus / Top expressed in: Apical ectodermal ridge; enamel knot; lumbar subsegment of spinal cord; myotome; primitive streak; sciatic nerve; inner cell mass; endoderm; embryo; blastocyst; More reference expression data
BioGPS	More reference expression data
Gene ontology
Molecular function	heparin binding; fibroblast growth factor receptor binding; growth factor activity; protein tyrosine kinase activity; phosphatidylinositol-4,5-bisphosphate 3-kinase activity; 1-phosphatidylinositol-3-kinase activity
Cellular component	extracellular region; intracellular anatomical structure
Biological process	cartilage condensation; MAPK cascade; negative regulation of apoptotic process; positive regulation of ERK1 and ERK2 cascade; apoptotic process involved in morphogenesis; signal transduction; cell-cell signaling; regulation of endothelial cell chemotaxis to fibroblast growth factor; multicellular organism development; embryonic limb morphogenesis; mesenchymal cell proliferation; positive regulation of cell division; regulation of gene expression; positive regulation of gene expression; stem cell population maintenance; chondroblast differentiation; cranial suture morphogenesis; positive regulation of transcription by RNA polymerase II; cell differentiation; positive regulation of protein phosphorylation; odontogenesis of dentin-containing tooth; embryonic hindlimb morphogenesis; fibroblast growth factor receptor signaling pathway; peptidyl-tyrosine phosphorylation; positive regulation of cell population proliferation; phosphatidylinositol phosphate biosynthetic process; phosphatidylinositol-3-phosphate biosynthetic process; cellular response to leukemia inhibitory factor; regulation of signaling receptor activity; positive regulation of protein kinase B signaling
Sources:Amigo / QuickGO
Orthologs
Databases	NCBI: entry; OMA: entry
Species	Human	Mouse
Entrez	2249	14175
Ensembl	ENSG00000075388	ENSMUSG00000050917
UniProt	P08620	P11403
RefSeq (mRNA)	NM_002007	NM_010202
RefSeq (protein)	NP_001998	NP_034332
Location (UCSC)	Chr 11: 69.77 – 69.78 Mb	Chr 7: 144.4 – 144.42 Mb
PubMed search
- Wikidata
View/Edit Human	View/Edit Mouse

Fibroblast growth factor 4 is a protein that in humans is encoded by the FGF4 gene.

The protein encoded by this gene is a member of the fibroblast growth factor (FGF) family. FGF family members possess broad mitogenic and cell survival activities and are involved in a variety of biological processes including embryonic development, cell growth, morphogenesis, tissue repair, tumor growth and invasion. This gene was identified by its oncogenic transforming activity. This gene and FGF3, another oncogenic growth factor, are located closely on chromosome 11. Co-amplification of both genes was found in various kinds of human tumors. Studies on the mouse homolog suggested a function in bone morphogenesis and limb development through the sonic hedgehog (SHH) signaling pathway.

== Function ==
During embryonic development, the 21-kD protein FGF4 acts as a signaling molecule critical for cell survival, proliferation, and patterning. It facilitates the survival and growth of the inner cell mass during the postimplantation phase by functioning as an autocrine or paracrine ligand. In the apical ectodermal ridge (AER), FGF4 plays a key role in initiating and sustaining limb bud outgrowth for both forelimbs and hindlimbs. It also regulates limb digit number and programmed cell death in the interdigital mesenchyme. Altered levels or regulation of FGF4 can lead to limb abnormalities such as postaxial polydactyly and cutaneous syndactyly, collectively known as polysyndactyly. In the absence of Fgf8, FGF4 is able to compensate by rescuing skeletal defects, indicating overlapping functions of FGF4 and FGF8 in limb skeleton patterning. In zebrafish, FGF4 is required for establishing the correct left-right patterning of visceral organs such as the liver, pancreas, and heart. In this context, FGF4 functions independently of FGF8, highlighting their distinct roles in visceral organ development.

Fgf signaling pathway has also been demonstrated to drive hindgut identity during gastrointestinal development, and the up regulation of the Fgf4 in pluripotent stem cell has been used to direct their differentiation for the generation of intestinal Organoids and tissues in vitro.

== Clinical significance ==
In canines, FGF4 retrogene insertions on chromosomes 12 and 18 have important clinical implications, particularly in relation to skeletal morphology and intervertebral disc disease (IVDD). These insertions are associated with disproportionate dwarfism characterized by shortened limbs and abnormal vertebral development.

The FGF4 retrogene on chromosome 12 is particularly associated with chondrodystrophy, a condition marked by shortened long bones, premature degeneration of intervertebral discs, and increased susceptibility to IVDD. These dogs often develop clinical symptoms such as spinal pain, limb weakness, and in severe cases, paralysis.

Meanwhile, the insertion on chromosome 18 contributes to a similar short-limbed phenotype but with variable impact on disc health. Recognition of these genetic variants has practical implications for veterinary care and breeding strategies, especially in predisposed breeds like Dachshunds, Corgis, and Basset Hounds.
