= Fibroblast growth factor 8 =

Protein-coding gene in the species Homo sapiens

FGF8
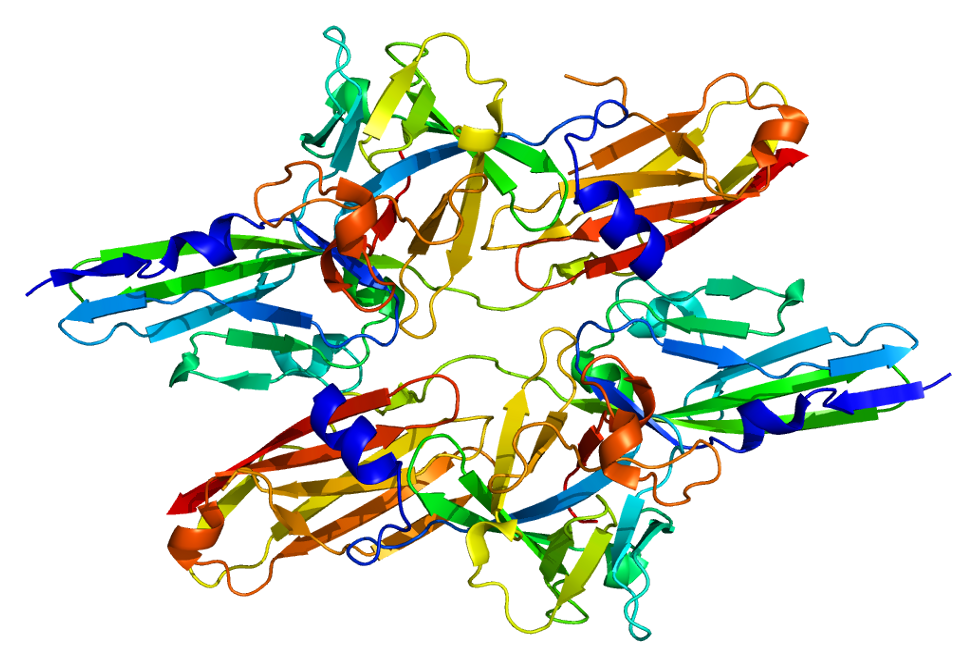

Identifiers
- Aliases: FGF8, AIGF, FGF-8, HBGF-8, HH6, KAL6, fibroblast growth factor 8
- External IDs: OMIM: 600483; MGI: 99604; GeneCards: FGF8
Available structures
PDB	Ortholog search: PDBe RCSB
PDB	List of PDB id codes 2FDB

Gene location (Human)
Chr.	Chromosome 10 (human)
Band	10q24.32	Start	101,770,109 bp
Band	10q24.32	End	101,780,371 bp

Gene location (Mouse)
Chr.	Chromosome 19 (mouse)
Band	19 C3|19 38.75 cM	Start	45,725,237 bp
Band	19 C3|19 38.75 cM	End	45,731,354 bp
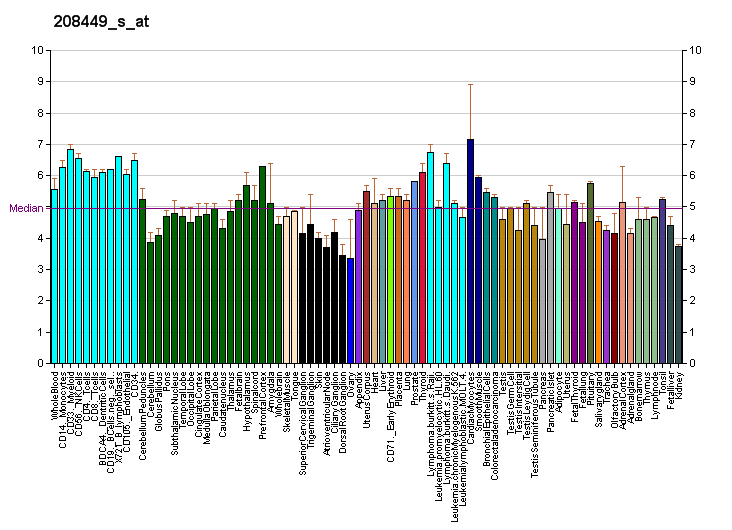
RNA expression pattern
Bgee	Human / Mouse (ortholog); Top expressed in: gonad; sural nerve; Brodmann area 9; monocyte; cingulate gyrus; anterior cingulate cortex; prefrontal cortex; right frontal lobe; tendon; primary visual cortex / Top expressed in: surface ectoderm; Apical ectodermal ridge; footplate; third ventricle; medial nasal prominence; pituitary stalk; infundibular recess; tail of embryo; lateral nasal prominence; endoderm; More reference expression data
BioGPS	More reference expression data
Gene ontology
Molecular function	type 1 fibroblast growth factor receptor binding; type 2 fibroblast growth factor receptor binding; growth factor activity; fibroblast growth factor receptor binding; chemoattractant activity; protein tyrosine kinase activity; 1-phosphatidylinositol-3-kinase activity; phosphatidylinositol-4,5-bisphosphate 3-kinase activity
Cellular component	extracellular region; intracellular anatomical structure; external side of plasma membrane; extracellular space
Biological process	negative regulation of neuron apoptotic process; cell migration involved in mesendoderm migration; male genitalia development; epithelial to mesenchymal transition involved in endocardial cushion formation; outflow tract morphogenesis; embryonic heart tube development; mesonephros development; heart looping; forebrain neuron development; blood vessel remodeling; central nervous system neuron development; positive regulation of ERK1 and ERK2 cascade; metanephros development; cell proliferation in forebrain; positive regulation of mitotic nuclear division; gonad development; pharyngeal system development; branching involved in salivary gland morphogenesis; apoptotic process; dopaminergic neuron differentiation; cell fate commitment; limb morphogenesis; kidney development; lung development; anatomical structure morphogenesis; signal transduction involved in regulation of gene expression; regulation of odontogenesis of dentin-containing tooth; response to oxidative stress; embryo development ending in birth or egg hatching; forebrain morphogenesis; development of the heart; telencephalon development; branching involved in ureteric bud morphogenesis; midbrain-hindbrain boundary development; branching involved in blood vessel morphogenesis; thyroid-stimulating hormone-secreting cell differentiation; positive chemotaxis; mesodermal cell migration; cell differentiation; dorsal/ventral axon guidance; corticotropin hormone secreting cell differentiation; organ induction; neural plate morphogenesis; positive regulation of organ growth; negative regulation of apoptotic process; BMP signaling pathway; outflow tract septum morphogenesis; odontogenesis; thyroid gland development; pallium development; gastrulation; canonical Wnt signaling pathway; subpallium development; lung morphogenesis; response to organic cyclic compound; otic vesicle formation; forebrain dorsal/ventral pattern formation; heart morphogenesis; aorta morphogenesis; generation of neurons; MAPK cascade; neuroepithelial cell differentiation; multicellular organism development; fibroblast growth factor receptor signaling pathway; positive regulation of gene expression; negative regulation of cardiac muscle tissue development; determination of left/right symmetry; inner ear morphogenesis; positive regulation of cell population proliferation; bone development; motor neuron axon guidance; positive regulation of cell division; embryonic hindlimb morphogenesis; phosphatidylinositol phosphate biosynthetic process; phosphatidylinositol-3-phosphate biosynthetic process; peptidyl-tyrosine phosphorylation; positive regulation of cell differentiation; regulation of signaling receptor activity; positive regulation of protein kinase B signaling; positive regulation of G protein-coupled receptor signaling pathway; positive regulation of peptidyl-tyrosine phosphorylation
Sources:Amigo / QuickGO
Orthologs
Databases	NCBI: entry; OMA: entry
Species	Human	Mouse
Entrez	2253	14179
Ensembl	ENSG00000107831	ENSMUSG00000025219
UniProt	P55075	P37237
RefSeq (mRNA)	NM_001206389; NM_006119; NM_033163; NM_033164; NM_033165	NM_001166361; NM_001166362; NM_001166363; NM_010205; NM_001379139 NM_001379140
RefSeq (protein)	NP_001193318; NP_006110; NP_149353; NP_149354; NP_149355	NP_001159833; NP_001159834; NP_001159835; NP_034335; NP_001366068 NP_001366069; NP_001390029
Location (UCSC)	Chr 10: 101.77 – 101.78 Mb	Chr 19: 45.73 – 45.73 Mb
PubMed search
- Wikidata
View/Edit Human	View/Edit Mouse

Fibroblast growth factor 8 (FGF-8) is a protein that in humans is encoded by the FGF8 gene.

== Function ==
The protein encoded by this gene belongs to the fibroblast growth factor (FGF) family. FGF proteins are multifunctional signaling molecules with broad mitogenic and cell survival activity, playing critical roles in embryonic development, cell proliferation, morphogenesis, tissue repair, and tumor progression. FGF8 signals primarily through fibroblast growth factor receptor 1 (FGFR1) to trigger downstream pathways involved in neural and limb development.

=== Neural development and brain patterning ===
FGF8 is essential for establishing the midbrain–hindbrain boundary (mesencephalon/metencephalon), a key signaling center during brain development. This region is defined by cross-repression between Otx2 and Gbx2, which helps maintain FGF8 expression. FGF8 then induces the expression of transcription factors, forming feedback loops that guide the development of the midbrain and hindbrain.

In the forebrain, FGF8 helps define cortical areas by regulating transcription factors such as Emx2, Pax6, COUP-TF1, and COUP-TF2. These factors are expressed in opposing gradients and interact to establish the anterior–posterior patterning of the cerebral cortex.

=== Patterning of body axes and germ layers ===
FGF8 plays a pivotal role in early embryonic patterning, influencing the development of all three germ layers. In the mesoderm, FGF8 helps regulate somite formation through the Clock and wavefront model, promoting segmentation and the establishment of anterior–posterior identity.

In the endoderm, FGF8 acts in coordination with retinoic acid (RA) to direct organ specification. Low levels of FGF8 promote the formation of anterior endodermal derivatives such as the liver and pancreas, while higher levels specify posterior structures such as the hindgut.

=== Limb development and morphogenesis ===
FGF8 is secreted by the apical ectodermal ridge (AER) at the distal end of limb buds and is essential for limb initiation, patterning, and outgrowth. Loss of FGF8 results in limb reduction or absence, with forelimbs and proximal segments being most affected. FGF8 also influences Sonic hedgehog (Shh) signaling and is involved in tendon and digit formation.

=== Craniofacial development ===
FGF8 also contributes to craniofacial development, including the formation of the teeth, palate, mandible, and salivary glands. Altered expression can result in craniofacial abnormalities such as cleft palate, mandibular hypoplasia, or tooth agenesis. In conclusion, FGF8 expression has effects on a person’s facial appearance, brain, lungs, heart, kidneys, and limbs. If there is not enough FGF8 or too much, there can be defects in all of these systems like limb loss, cleft lip/ palate, kidney disease, and neurodevelopmental defects.

== Clinical significance ==
This protein is known to be a factor that supports androgen and anchorage independent growth of mammary tumor cells. Overexpression of this gene has been shown to increase tumor growth and angiogenesis. The adult expression of this gene was once thought to be restricted to testes and ovaries but has been described in several organ systems. Temporal and spatial pattern of this gene expression suggests its function as an embryonic epithelial factor. Studies of the mouse and chick homologs reveal roles in midbrain and limb development, organogenesis, embryo gastrulation and left-right axis determination. The alternative splicing of this gene results in four transcript variants.

FGF8 has been documented to play a role in oralmaxillogacial diseases and CRISPR-cas9 gene targeting on FGF8 may be key in treating these diseases. Cleft lip and/or palate (CLP) genome wide gene analysis shows a D73H missense mutation in the FGF8 gene which reduces the binding affinity of FGF8. Loss of TBX1 and Tfap2 can result in proliferation and apoptosis in the palate cells increasing the risk of CLP. Overexpression of FGF8 due to misregulation of the Gli processing gene may result in ciliopathies. Agnathia, a malformation of the mandible, is often a lethal condition that comes from the absence of BMP4 regulators (noggin and chordin), resulting in high levels of BMP4 signaling, which in turn drastically reduces FGF8 signaling, increasing cell death during mandibular outgrowth. Lastly, the ability for FGF8 to regulate cell proliferation has caused interest in its effects on tumors or squamous cell carcinoma. CRISPR-cas9 gene targeting methods are currently being studied to determine if they are the key to solving FGF8 mutations associated with oral diseases.

== Knockout models ==
FGF-8 knockout models have led to lethality in gastrulating state embryos in mice models. Research has demonstrated that decreased expression of FGF-8 can alter the cleft lip pathology in mice. However, due to the importance that FGF-8 has in the development and programming in multiple organ systems, full "knockout" models have led to embryonic death in multiple studies, limiting the ability to study the removal of the morphogen in adult models. While knockout experiments have occurred with this gene, a lack of/mutation in FGF8 in the early stages of embryo development is lethal. Disruption of the gene in later developmental stages has caused several issues with limb formation and development. Researchers hope to determine a way to study the signaling molecule in the future to investigate how to prevent defects including Kallmann syndrome.
