= Avasimibe =

Drug

Clinical data
- Other names: 2,6-diisopropylphenyl (2-(2,4,6-triisopropylphenyl)acetyl)sulfamate
- Routes of administration: Oral
- ATC code: C10AX (WHO)

Legal status
- Legal status: Investigational

Pharmacokinetic data
- Metabolism: Hepatic (CYP3A4, 2C9)
- Elimination half-life: 15–24 hours
- Excretion: Fecal (predominant), renal (<2%)

Identifiers
- IUPAC name: [2,6-di(propan-2-yl)phenyl] N-[2-[2,4,6-tri(propan-2-yl)phenyl]acetyl]sulfamate
- CAS Number: 166518-60-1
- PubChem CID: 166558
- DrugBank: 06442
- ChemSpider: 145759
- UNII: 28LQ20T5RC
- KEGG: D03012
- ChEBI: CHEBI:177719
- ChEMBL: ChEMBL101309

Chemical and physical data
- Formula: C_{29}H_{43}NO_{4}S
- Molar mass: 501.73 g·mol^{−1}
- 3D model (JSmol): Interactive image
- SMILES: CC(C)C1=C(C(=CC=C1)C(C)C)OS(=O)(=O)NC(=O)CC2=C(C=C(C=C2C(C)C)C(C)C)C(C)C
- InChI: InChI=1S/C29H43NO4S/c1-17(2)22-14-25(20(7)8)27(26(15-22)21(9)10)16-28(31)30-35(32,33)34-29-23(18(3)4)12-11-13-24(29)19(5)6/h11-15,17-21H,16H2,1-10H3,(H,30,31); Key:PTQXTEKSNBVPQJ-UHFFFAOYSA-N

Avasimibe (INN), codenamed CI 1011, is a drug that inhibits sterol O-acyltransferases (SOAT1 and SOAT2, also known as ACAT1 and ACAT2), enzymes involved in the metabolism and catabolism of cholesterol. It was discovered by Parke-Davis (later Pfizer) and developed as a possible lipid-lowering agent and treatment for atherosclerosis.

The first description of avasimibe was published in 1996. Clinical trials began in 1997. However, development was halted in 2003 due to a high potential for interactions with other medicines, and a pivotal study found it had no favorable effect on atherosclerosis and actually increased LDL cholesterol levels significantly.

SOAT/ACAT inhibition has since been discredited as a viable strategy for treating high cholesterol and atherosclerosis, but renewed interest in avasimibe has arisen due to its potential antitumor utility through other mechanisms.

It has never been marketed or used outside clinical trials.

== Pharmacology ==
=== Mechanism of action ===
Avasimibe is a potent activator of the pregnane X receptor and, consequently, an indirect inducer of CYP3A4 and P-glycoprotein, as well as a potent inhibitor of several cytochrome P450 isoenzymes, including CYP1A2, CYP2C9, and CYP2C19; its spectrum of CYP induction and inhibition is similar to that of rifampicin.

=== Pharmacokinetics ===
Avasimibe is better absorbed when taken with food, especially with a high-fat meal, as reflected by increases in its peak serum concentration and AUC.

== History ==
Avasimibe was the result of a rational drug design process carried out at Parke-Davis in the early 1990s which sought to obtain orally bioavailable, water-soluble ACAT inhibitors; all such inhibitors known at the time were lipophilic and poorly absorbed when taken by mouth. This process yielded several compounds with potential, including one (designated PD 138142–15) with good solubility in water and remarkable efficacy in animal studies, but it was chemically unstable and degraded rapidly, especially in acidic environments. (Undesirable CYP450 induction was first noted at this time, in PD 138142-15 and its degradation products.) Chemical modification of PD 138142-15 and retrosynthetic analysis found that avasimibe (then codenamed CI-1011) could be easily manufactured from commercially available starting compounds, and once its efficacy was demonstrated in vitro and in rat studies, it was selected for further development.

After additional safety and preclinical efficacy studies in animals, phase I clinical trials in humans began in 1997, first for hyperlipidemia (June) and subsequently for atherosclerosis (December). Phase II trials for both indications followed in 1998, and phase III trials in 2001.

In October 2003, clinical development of avasimibe was discontinued. Later research discredited the concept of ACAT inhibition as a treatment for dyslipidemia and atherosclerosis, and interest in these compounds as a class waned accordingly.

== Research ==
Since the termination of its development as an antilipidemic agent, there has been renewed interest in potential repurposing of avasimibe as an antitumor drug and to prevent or treat bacterial infections by decreasing bacterial virulence. As of 2022, these potential indications remain in preclinical research.
