= Sonic hedgehog protein =

Critical protein in embryonic development

SHH
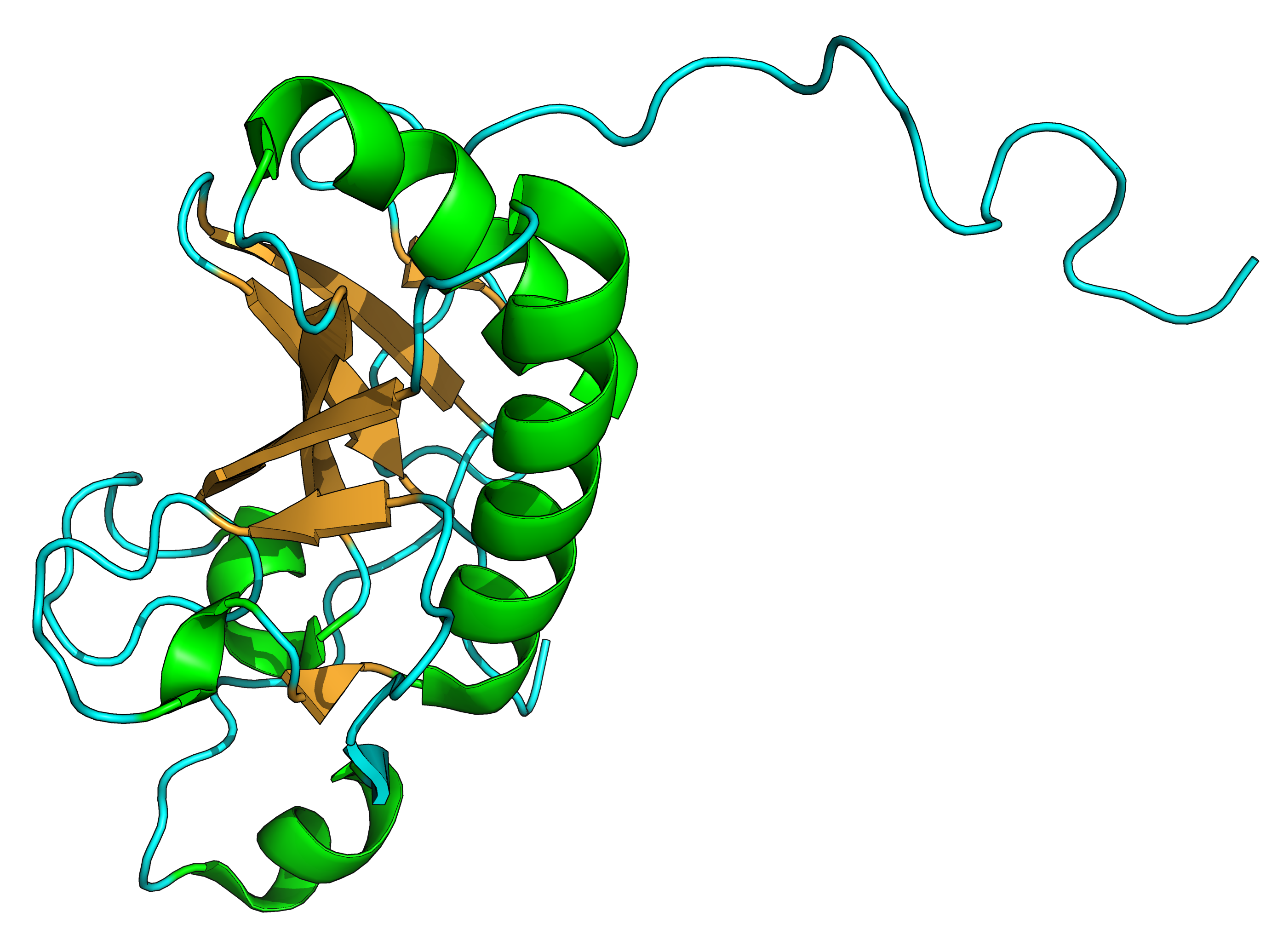

Identifiers
- Aliases: SHH, HHG1, HLP3, HPE3, MCOPCB5, SMMCI, TPT, TPTPS, sonic hedgehog, Sonic hedgehog, ShhNC, sonic hedgehog signaling molecule
- External IDs: OMIM: 600725; MGI: 98297; GeneCards: SHH
Available structures
PDB	Ortholog search: PDBe RCSB
PDB	List of PDB id codes 3HO5, 3M1N, 3MXW

Gene location (Human)
Chr.	Chromosome 7 (human)
Band	7q36.3	Start	155,799,980 bp
Band	7q36.3	End	155,812,463 bp

Gene location (Mouse)
Chr.	Chromosome 5 (mouse)
Band	5 B1|5 14.39 cM	Start	28,661,813 bp
Band	5 B1|5 14.39 cM	End	28,672,254 bp
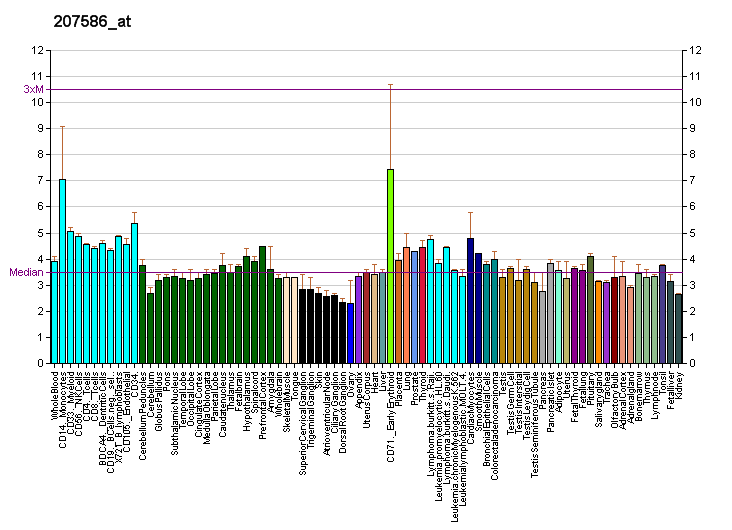
RNA expression pattern
Bgee	Human / Mouse (ortholog); Top expressed in: right lobe of liver; pancreatic epithelial cell; sural nerve; right adrenal cortex; left adrenal cortex; testicle; mucosa of transverse colon; gallbladder; urinary bladder; spinal ganglia / Top expressed in: transitional epithelium of urinary bladder; tooth; molar; incisor; oral mucosa; tongue; Hindgut; left lung lobe; notochord; epithelium of stomach; More reference expression data
BioGPS	More reference expression data
Gene ontology
Molecular function	calcium ion binding; metal ion binding; patched binding; peptidase activity; zinc ion binding; laminin-1 binding; glycosaminoglycan binding; morphogen activity; hydrolase activity; protein binding; endopeptidase activity
Cellular component	cytosol; endoplasmic reticulum lumen; membrane; cell surface; membrane raft; plasma membrane; extracellular space; extracellular region; extracellular matrix
Biological process	positive regulation of skeletal muscle cell proliferation; pattern specification process; myotube differentiation; mesenchymal cell proliferation; male genitalia development; bud outgrowth involved in lung branching; limb bud formation; T cell differentiation in thymus; embryonic pattern specification; positive regulation of skeletal muscle tissue development; positive regulation of immature T cell proliferation in thymus; positive regulation of kidney smooth muscle cell differentiation; negative regulation of Wnt signaling pathway; anatomical structure formation involved in morphogenesis; ectoderm development; hindgut morphogenesis; spinal cord dorsal/ventral patterning; formation of anatomical boundary; oligodendrocyte differentiation; trachea development; prostate gland development; negative regulation of transcription elongation from RNA polymerase II promoter; limb development; vasculogenesis; primary prostatic bud elongation; heart looping; telencephalon regionalization; odontogenesis of dentin-containing tooth; positive regulation of mesenchymal cell proliferation; angiogenesis; positive regulation of epithelial cell proliferation involved in prostate gland development; positive regulation of striated muscle cell differentiation; negative regulation of proteasomal ubiquitin-dependent protein catabolic process; embryonic digestive tract morphogenesis; apoptotic signaling pathway; inner ear development; hair follicle morphogenesis; cell population proliferation; metanephros development; lung epithelium development; negative regulation of canonical Wnt signaling pathway; regulation of proteolysis; branching involved in salivary gland morphogenesis; negative regulation of mesenchymal cell apoptotic process; positive regulation of neuroblast proliferation; dopaminergic neuron differentiation; intermediate filament organization; renal system development; cell fate commitment; regulation of transcription, DNA-templated; positive regulation of smoothened signaling pathway; androgen metabolic process; kidney development; lung development; negative regulation of protein catabolic process; thymus development; embryonic organ development; negative regulation of cell differentiation; negative regulation of dopaminergic neuron differentiation; embryonic digit morphogenesis; negative regulation of alpha-beta T cell differentiation; positive regulation of sclerotome development; epithelial-mesenchymal cell signaling; negative regulation of gene expression; lymphoid progenitor cell differentiation; negative thymic T cell selection; positive regulation of transcription, DNA-templated; positive regulation of Wnt signaling pathway; ventral midline development; central nervous system development; development of the heart; branching involved in ureteric bud morphogenesis; negative regulation of T cell proliferation; embryonic limb morphogenesis; positive regulation of cell differentiation; branching involved in prostate gland morphogenesis; positive regulation of mesenchymal cell proliferation involved in ureter development; establishment of cell polarity; branching involved in blood vessel morphogenesis; positive regulation of cerebellar granule cell precursor proliferation; neuroblast proliferation; pancreas development; positive regulation of protein import into nucleus; smoothened signaling pathway; oligodendrocyte development; camera-type eye development; spinal cord motor neuron differentiation; positive regulation of alpha-beta T cell differentiation; digestive tract morphogenesis; hair follicle development; positive regulation of oligodendrocyte differentiation; roof of mouth development; left lung development; striated muscle tissue development; positive regulation of T cell differentiation in thymus; cellular response to lithium ion; embryonic foregut morphogenesis; anatomical structure development; thalamus development; stem cell development; smoothened signaling pathway involved in regulation of cerebellar granule cell precursor cell proliferation; cell fate specification; negative regulation of apoptotic process; negative regulation of transcription by RNA polymerase II; regulation of nodal signaling pathway involved in determination of lateral mesoderm left/right asymmetry; proteolysis; embryonic skeletal system development; regulation of protein localization to nucleus; odontogenesis; respiratory tube development; regulation of prostatic bud formation; thyroid gland development; negative regulation of cell migration; developmental growth; right lung development; determination of left/right asymmetry in lateral mesoderm; positive thymic T cell selection; mesenchymal smoothened signaling pathway involved in prostate gland development; canonical Wnt signaling pathway; regulation of gene expression; osteoblast development; negative regulation of cholesterol efflux; dorsal/ventral neural tube patterning; regulation of epithelial cell proliferation involved in prostate gland development; epithelial-mesenchymal signaling involved in prostate gland development; dorsal/ventral pattern formation; branching morphogenesis of an epithelial tube; lung lobe morphogenesis; embryonic forelimb morphogenesis; midbrain development; skin development; regulation of odontogenesis; regulation of mesenchymal cell proliferation involved in prostate gland development; mesenchymal cell proliferation involved in lung development; positive regulation of hh target transcription factor activity; prostate epithelial cord elongation; metanephric mesenchymal cell proliferation involved in metanephros development; endocytosis; lung morphogenesis; cell development; trachea morphogenesis; epithelial cell proliferation involved in salivary gland morphogenesis; cell-cell signaling; salivary gland cavitation; hindbrain development; blood coagulation; negative regulation of kidney smooth muscle cell differentiation; somite development; cerebellar granule cell precursor proliferation; axon guidance; negative regulation of ureter smooth muscle cell differentiation; positive regulation of ureter smooth muscle cell differentiation; multicellular organism development; animal organ formation; intein-mediated protein splicing; determination of left/right symmetry; vasculature development; positive regulation of gene expression; regulation of cell population proliferation; embryonic morphogenesis; neural crest cell migration; polarity specification of anterior/posterior axis; positive regulation of cell population proliferation; artery development; protein localization to nucleus; Bergmann glial cell differentiation; forebrain development; neuron fate commitment; CD4-positive or CD8-positive, alpha-beta T cell lineage commitment; striated muscle cell differentiation; myoblast differentiation; lung-associated mesenchyme development; epithelial tube branching involved in lung morphogenesis; positive regulation of cell division; positive regulation of transcription by RNA polymerase II; anterior/posterior pattern specification; embryonic hindlimb morphogenesis; forebrain regionalization; cell proliferation in external granule layer; tracheoesophageal septum formation; regulation of signaling receptor activity
Sources:Amigo / QuickGO
Orthologs
Databases	NCBI: entry; OMA: entry
Species	Human	Mouse
Entrez	6469	20423
Ensembl	ENSG00000164690	ENSMUSG00000002633
UniProt	Q15465	Q62226
RefSeq (mRNA)	NM_000193; NM_001310462	NM_009170
RefSeq (protein)	NP_000184; NP_001297391	NP_033196
Location (UCSC)	Chr 7: 155.8 – 155.81 Mb	Chr 5: 28.66 – 28.67 Mb
PubMed search
- Wikidata
View/Edit Human	View/Edit Mouse

Sonic hedgehog protein (SHH) is a major signaling molecule of embryonic development in planulozoan animals, encoded by the SHH gene.

This signaling molecule is key in regulating embryonic morphogenesis in complex animals. SHH controls organogenesis and the organization of the central nervous system, limbs, digits and many other parts of the body. Sonic hedgehog is a morphogen that patterns the developing embryo using a concentration gradient characterized by the French flag model. This model has a non-uniform distribution of SHH molecules which governs different cell fates according to concentration. Mutations in this gene can contribute to the development of holoprosencephaly, a developmental anomaly in which an embryo's forebrain fails to split the right and left sides of the brain.

Sonic hedgehog plays a role in differentiation, proliferation, and maintenance of adult tissues. Abnormal activation of SHH signaling in adult tissues has also been implicated in various types of cancers.

== Discovery and naming ==
The hedgehog gene (hh) was first identified in the fruit fly Drosophila melanogaster in the classic Heidelberg screens of Christiane Nüsslein-Volhard and Eric Wieschaus, as published in 1980. These screens, which led to the researchers winning a Nobel Prize in 1995 along with developmental geneticist Edward B. Lewis, identified genes that control the segmentation pattern of the Drosophila embryos. The hh loss of function mutant phenotype causes the embryos to be covered with denticles, i.e. small pointy projections resembling the spikes of a hedgehog. Investigations aimed at finding a hedgehog equivalent in vertebrates by Philip Ingham, Andrew P. McMahon and Clifford Tabin revealed three homologous genes.

Two of these genes, desert hedgehog and Indian hedgehog, were named for species of hedgehogs, while sonic hedgehog was named after the video game character Sonic the Hedgehog. The gene was named by Robert Riddle, a postdoctoral fellow at the Tabin Lab, after his wife Betsy Wilder came home with a magazine containing an advert for the first game in the series, Sonic the Hedgehog (1991). In the zebrafish, two of the three vertebrate hh genes are duplicated: SHH a and SHH b (formerly described as tiggywinkle hedgehog, named for Mrs. Tiggy-Winkle, a character from Beatrix Potter's books for children) and ihha and ihhb (formerly described as echidna hedgehog, named for the spiny anteater and not specifically for the character Knuckles the Echidna in the Sonic franchise).

== Function ==
Of the hh homologues, SHH has been found to have the most critical roles in development, acting as a morphogen involved in patterning many systems—including the anterior pituitary, pallium of the brain, spinal cord, lungs, teeth and the thalamus by the zona limitans intrathalamica. In vertebrates, the development of limbs and digits depends on the secretion of sonic hedgehog by the zone of polarizing activity, located on the posterior side of the embryonic limb bud. Mutations in the human sonic hedgehog gene SHH cause holoprosencephaly type 3 HPE3, as a result of the loss of the ventral midline. The sonic hedgehog transcription pathway has also been linked to the formation of specific kinds of cancerous tumors, including the embryonic cerebellar tumor and medulloblastoma, as well as the progression of prostate cancer tumours. For SHH to be expressed in the developing embryo limbs, a morphogen called fibroblast growth factors must be secreted from the apical ectodermal ridge.

Sonic hedgehog has also been shown to act as an axonal guidance cue. It has been demonstrated that SHH attracts commissural axons at the ventral midline of the developing spinal cord. Specifically, SHH attracts retinal ganglion cell (RGC) axons at low concentrations and repels them at higher concentrations. The absence (non-expression) of SHH has been shown to control the growth of nascent hind limbs in cetaceans (whales and dolphins).

The SHH gene is a member of the hedgehog gene family with five variations of DNA sequence alterations or splice variants. SHH is located on chromosome seven and initiates the production of Sonic Hedgehog protein. This protein sends short- and long-range signals to embryonic tissues to regulate development. If the SHH gene is mutated or absent, the protein Sonic Hedgehog cannot do its job properly. Sonic hedgehog contributes to cell growth, cell specification and formation, structuring and organization of the body plan. This protein functions as a vital morphogenic signaling molecule and plays an important role in the formation of many different structures in developing embryos. The SHH gene affects several major organ systems, such as the nervous system, cardiovascular system, respiratory system and musculoskeletal system. Mutations in the SHH gene can cause malformation of components of these systems, which can result in major problems in the developing embryo. The brain and eyes, for example, can be significantly impacted by mutations in this gene and cause disorders such as microphtalmia and holoprosencephaly. Microphthalmia is a condition that affects the eyes, which results in small, underdeveloped tissues in one or both eyes. This can lead to issues ranging from a coloboma to a single small eye to the absence of eyes altogether. Holoprosencephaly is a condition most commonly caused by a mutation of the SHH gene that causes improper separation or turn of the left and right brain and facial dysmorphia. Many systems and structures rely heavily on proper expression of the SHH gene and subsequent sonic hedgehog protein, earning it the distinction of being an essential gene to development.

=== Patterning of the central nervous system ===
The sonic hedgehog (SHH) signaling molecule assumes various roles in patterning the central nervous system (CNS) during vertebrate development. One of the most characterized functions of SHH is its role in the induction of the floor plate and diverse ventral cell types within the neural tube. The notochord—a structure derived from the axial mesoderm—produces SHH, which travels extracellularly to the ventral region of the neural tube and instructs those cells to form the floor plate. Another view of floor plate induction hypothesizes that some precursor cells located in the notochord are inserted into the neural plate before its formation, later giving rise to the floor plate.

The neural tube itself is the initial groundwork of the vertebrate CNS, and the floor plate is a specialized structure, located at the ventral midpoint of the neural tube. Evidence supporting the notochord as the signaling center comes from studies in which a second notochord is implanted near a neural tube in vivo, leading to the formation of an ectopic floor plate within the neural tube.

SHH and BMP gradients in the vertebrate neural tube

Ectopic floor plate formation

Ventral neural domains in neural tube

Sonic hedgehog is the secreted protein that mediates signaling activities of the notochord and floor plate. Studies involving ectopic expression of SHH in vitro and in vivo result in floor plate induction and differentiation of motor neuron and ventral interneurons. On the other hand, mice mutants for SHH lack ventral spinal cord characteristics. In vitro blocking of SHH signaling using antibodies against it shows similar phenotypes. SHH exerts its effects in a concentration-dependent manner, so that a high concentration of SHH results in a local inhibition of cellular proliferation. This inhibition causes the floor plate to become thin compared to the lateral regions of the neural tube. Lower concentration of SHH results in cellular proliferation and induction of various ventral neural cell types. Once the floor plate is established, cells residing in this region will subsequently express SHH themselves, generating a concentration gradient within the neural tube.

Although there is no direct evidence of a SHH gradient, there is indirect evidence via the visualization of Patched (Ptc) gene expression, which encodes for the ligand binding domain of the SHH receptor throughout the ventral neural tube. In vitro studies show that incremental two- and threefold changes in SHH concentration give rise to motor neuron and different interneuronal subtypes as found in the ventral spinal cord. These incremental changes in vitro correspond to the distance of domains from the signaling tissue (notochord and floor plate) which subsequently differentiates into different neuronal subtypes as it occurs in vitro. Graded SHH signaling is suggested to be mediated through the Gli family of proteins, which are vertebrate homologues of the Drosophila zinc-finger-containing transcription factor Cubitus interruptus (Ci). Ci is a crucial mediator of hedgehog (Hh) signaling in Drosophila. In vertebrates, three different Gli proteins are present, viz. Gli1, Gli2 and Gli3, which are expressed in the neural tube. Mice mutants for Gli1 show normal spinal cord development, suggesting that it is dispensable for mediating SHH activity. However, Gli2 mutant mice show abnormalities in the ventral spinal cord, with severe defects in the floor plate and ventral-most interneurons (V3). Gli3 antagonizes SHH function in a dose-dependent manner, promoting dorsal neuronal subtypes. SHH mutant phenotypes can be rescued in a SHH/Gli3 double mutant. Gli proteins have a C-terminal activation domain and an N-terminal repressive domain.

SHH is suggested to promote the activation function of Gli2 and inhibit repressive activity of Gli3. SHH also seems to promote the activation function of Gli3, but this activity is not strong enough. The graded concentration of SHH gives rise to graded activity of Gli 2 and Gli3, which promote ventral and dorsal neuronal subtypes in the ventral spinal cord. Evidence from Gli3 and SHH/Gli3 mutants show that SHH primarily regulates the spatial restriction of progenitor domains rather than being inductive, as SHH/Gli3 mutants show intermixing of cell types.

SHH also induces other proteins with which it interacts, and these interactions can influence the sensitivity of a cell towards SHH. Hedgehog-interacting protein (HHIP) is induced by SHH, which in turn attenuates its signaling activity. Vitronectin is another protein that is induced by SHH; it acts as an obligate co-factor for SHH signaling in the neural tube.

There are five distinct progenitor domains in the ventral neural tube: V3 interneurons, motor neurons (MN), V2, V1, and V0 interneurons (in ventral to dorsal order). These different progenitor domains are established by "communication" between different classes of homeobox transcription factors. (See Trigeminal Nerve.) These transcription factors respond to SHH gradient concentration. Depending upon the nature of their interaction with SHH, they are classified into two groups—class I and class II—and are composed of members from the Pax, Nkx, Dbx and Irx families. Class I proteins are repressed at different thresholds of SHH delineating ventral boundaries of progenitor domains, while class II proteins are activated at different thresholds of SHH delineating the dorsal limit of domains. Selective cross-repressive interactions between class I and class II proteins give rise to five cardinal ventral neuronal subtypes.

SHH is not the only signaling molecule exerting an effect on the developing neural tube. Many other molecules, pathways and mechanisms are active (e.g., RA, FGF, BMP), and complex interactions between SHH and other molecules are possible. BMPs are suggested to play a critical role in determining the sensitivity of neural cell to SHH signaling. Evidence supporting this comes from studies using BMP inhibitors that ventralize the fate of the neural plate cell for a given SHH concentration. On the other hand, mutation in BMP antagonists (e.g., noggin) produces severe defects in the ventral-most characteristics of the spinal cord, followed by ectopic expression of BMP in the ventral neural tube. Interactions of SHH with Fgf and RA have not yet been studied in molecular detail.

=== Morphogenetic activity ===
The concentration- and time-dependent, cell-fate-determining activity of SHH in the ventral neural tube makes it a prime example of a morphogen. In vertebrates, SHH signaling in the ventral portion of the neural tube is most notably responsible for the induction of floor plate cells and motor neurons. Higher concentrations of the SHH ligand are found in the most ventral aspects of the neural tube and notochord, while lower concentrations are found in the more dorsal regions of the neural tube. The SHH concentration gradient has been visualized in the neural tube of mice engineered to express a SHH::GFP fusion protein to show this graded distribution of SHH during the time of ventral neural tube patterning.

It is thought that the SHH gradient works to elicit multiple different cell fates by a concentration- and time-dependent mechanism that induces a variety of transcription factors in the ventral progenitor cells. Each of the ventral progenitor domains expresses a highly individualized combination of transcription factors—Nkx2.2, Olig2, Nkx6.1, Nkx6.2, Dbx1, Dbx2, Irx3, Pax6, and Pax7—that is regulated by the SHH gradient. These transcription factors are induced sequentially along the SHH concentration gradient with respect to the amount and time of exposure to SHH ligand.

SHH expression in the frontonasal ectodermal zone (FEZ), which is a signaling center that is responsible for the patterned development of the upper jaw, regulates craniofacial development mediating through the miR-199 family in the FEZ. Specifically, SHH-dependent signals from the brain regulate genes of the miR-199 family with downregulations of the miR-199 genes increasing SHH expression and resulting in wider faces, while upregulations of the miR-199 genes decrease SHH expression resulting in narrow faces.

=== Tooth development ===
SHH plays an important role in organogenesis and, most importantly, craniofacial development. Being that SHH is a signaling molecule, it primarily works by diffusion along a concentration gradient, affecting cells in different manners. In early tooth development, SHH is released from the primary enamel knot—a signaling center—to provide positional information in both a lateral and planar signaling pattern in tooth development and regulation of tooth cusp growth. SHH in particular is needed for growth of epithelial cervical loops, where the outer and inner epitheliums join and form a reservoir for dental stem cells. After the primary enamel knots are apoptosed, the secondary enamel knots are formed. The secondary enamel knots secrete SHH in combination with other signaling molecules to thicken the oral ectoderm and begin patterning the complex shapes of the crown of a tooth during differentiation and mineralization. In a knockout gene model, absence of SHH is indicative of holoprosencephaly. However, SHH activates downstream molecules of Gli2 and Gli3. Mutant Gli2 and Gli3 embryos have abnormal development of incisors that are arrested in early tooth development as well as small molars.

=== Lung development ===
Although SHH is most commonly associated with brain and limb digit development, it is also important in lung development. Studies using qPCR and knockouts have demonstrated that SHH contributes to embryonic lung development. The mammalian lung branching occurs in the epithelium of the developing bronchi and lungs. SHH expressed throughout the foregut endoderm (innermost of three germ layers) in the distal epithelium, where the embryonic lungs are developing. This suggests that SHH is partially responsible for the branching of the lungs. Further evidence of SHH's role in lung branching has been seen with qPCR. SHH expression occurs in the developing lungs around embryonic day 11 and is strongly expressed in the buds of the fetal lungs but low in the developing bronchi. Mice who are deficient in SHH can develop tracheoesophageal fistula (abnormal connection of the esophagus and trachea). Additionally, a double (SHH-/- ) knockout mouse model exhibited poor lung development. The lungs of the SHH double knockout failed to undergo lobation and branching (i.e., the abnormal lungs only developed one branch, compared to an extensively branched phenotype of the wildtype).

=== Potential regenerative function ===
Sonic hedgehog may play a role in mammalian hair cell regeneration. By modulating retinoblastoma protein activity in rat cochlea, sonic hedgehog allows mature hair cells that normally cannot return to a proliferative state to divide and differentiate. Retinoblastoma proteins suppress cell growth by preventing cells from returning to the cell cycle, thereby preventing proliferation. Inhibiting the activity of Rb seems to allow cells to divide. Therefore, sonic hedgehog—identified as an important regulator of Rb—may also prove to be an important feature in regrowing hair cells after damage.

SHH is important for regulating dermal adipogenesis by hair follicle transit-amplifying cells (HF-TACs). Specifically, SHH induces dermal angiogenesis by acting directly on adipocyte precursors and promoting their proliferation through their expression of the peroxisome proliferator-activated receptor γ (Pparg) gene.

=== Clinical significance ===
Recent studies have shown that abnormalities in SHH signaling pathways are associated with both neurodegenerative diseases and developmental disorders. Mutations in the SHH gene can result in conditions such as holoprosencephaly, a brain defect caused by failure of the embryonic forebrain to divide into two hemispheres. In adults, SHH signaling may be involved in neuronal damage and cognitive impairment in Alzheimers disease. Conversely, SHH has a protective role in Parkinson's disease by supporting the survival of dopaminergic neurons and reducing oxidative stress.

== Processing ==
SHH undergoes a series of processing steps before it is secreted from the cell. Newly synthesised SHH weighs 45 kDa and is referred to as the preproprotein. As a secreted protein, it contains a short signal sequence at its N-terminus, which is recognised by the signal recognition particle during the translocation into the endoplasmic reticulum (ER), the first step in protein secretion. Once translocation is complete, the signal sequence is removed by signal peptidase in the ER. There, SHH undergoes autoprocessing to generate a 20 kDa N-terminal signaling domain (SHH-N) and a 25 kDa C-terminal domain with no known signaling role. The cleavage is catalysed by a protease within the C-terminal domain. During the reaction, a cholesterol molecule is added to the C-terminus of SHH-N. Thus, the C-terminal domain acts as an intein and a cholesterol transferase. Another hydrophobic moiety, a palmitate, is added to the alpha-amine of N-terminal cysteine of SHH-N. This modification is required for efficient signaling, resulting in a 30-fold increase in potency over the non-palmitylated form and is carried out by a member of the membrane-bound O-acyltransferase family Protein-cysteine N-palmitoyltransferase HHAT.

== Robotnikinin ==
A potential inhibitor of the Hedgehog signaling pathway has been found and dubbed "Robotnikinin"—after Sonic the Hedgehog's nemesis and the main antagonist of the Sonic the Hedgehog game series, Dr. Ivo Robotnik, better known as Dr. Eggman named by Sonic the Hedgehog.

== Former controversy surrounding name ==
The gene has been linked to a condition known as holoprosencephaly, which can result in severe brain, skull and facial defects, causing a few clinicians and scientists to criticize the name on the grounds that it sounds too frivolous. It has been noted that mention of a mutation in a sonic hedgehog gene might not be well received in a discussion of a serious disorder with a patient or their family. Science reporter Nicholas Wade discussed the controversy over the naming of this molecule, and the efforts to rename it, in a November 2006 interview with Sue Povey, professor of biology at University College London and head of the genome nomenclature committee of the Human Genome Organization. This controversy has largely died down, and the name is now generally seen as a humorous relic of the time before the rise of fast, cheap complete genome sequencing and standardized nomenclature. The problem of the "inappropriateness" of the names of genes such as "Mothers against decapentaplegic," "Lunatic fringe," and "Sonic hedgehog" is largely avoided by using standardized abbreviations when speaking with patients and their families.

== Gallery ==
SHH gradient and Gli activity in the vertebrate neural tube

Processing of SHH

Concentration gradient of SHH

== See also ==
- Pikachurin, a retinal protein named after Pikachu
- Zbtb7, an oncogene which was originally named "Pokémon"
