= MBOAT =

Family of various acyltransferase enzymes

Identifiers
- Symbol: MBOAT
- Pfam: PF03062
- Pfam clan: CL0517
- InterPro: IPR004299
Available protein structures:
- PDB: IPR004299 PF03062 (ECOD; PDBsum)
- AlphaFold: IPR004299; PF03062

MBOAT_2

Identifiers
- Symbol: MBOAT_2
- Pfam: PF13813
- Pfam clan: CL0517
Available protein structures:
- PDB: PF13813 (ECOD; PDBsum)
- AlphaFold: PF13813

The MBOAT (membrane bound O-acyl transferase) family of membrane proteins is a family of various acyltransferase enzymes. All family members contain multiple transmembrane domains and most carry two conserved residues, a conserved histidine (His) embedded in a hydrophobic stretch of residues and an asparagine (Asn) or histidine within a more hydrophilic region some 30-50 residues upstream.

MBOAT enzymes catalyze the transfer of an acyl group from an acyl-coenzyme or accessory protein to one of several different substrates. The family is found from bacteria to eukaryotes.

The family may be grouped into three categories, according to function:

1. enzymes involved in neutral lipid biosynthesis;
2. enzymes involved in protein/peptide acylation;
3. enzymes involved in phospholipid re-modelling.

== Structure ==
The structure for one MBOAT protein, DltB from Streptococcus thermophilus (Q5M4V4), has been solved. DltB performs D-alanylation of cell-wall teichoic acid. It contains a ring of 11 transmembrane helices surrounding a tunnel that goes through the biological membrane. The tunnel connects to a partner, DltC, which carries the D-alanine to the conserved histidine residue of DltB MBOAT located at the bottom of the funnel. A computational model of human ghrelin O-acyltransferase (GOAT) (Q96T53) revealed a transmembrane channel that facilitates octanoylation of the peptide hormone ghrelin. DltB and GOAT share structural similarities in their homologous regions, suggesting a common core fold for MBOAT family members.

== Human proteins with this domain ==
- DGAT1
- GUP1
- HHAT
- HHATL
- LPCAT3
- MBOAT1
- MBOAT2
- MBOAT4
- MBOAT7
- PORCN
- SOAT1
- SOAT2
