= SOAT =

SOAT may refer to

- SOAT1, an enzyme and human gene on chromosome 1
- SOAT2, an enzyme and human gene on chromosome 12
- Sudan Organisation Against Torture, a London-based human rights group
- Snakes on a Train, a 2006 thriller film
- Scarborough Open Air Theatre
