= Robert V. Farese Jr. =

American physician-scientist

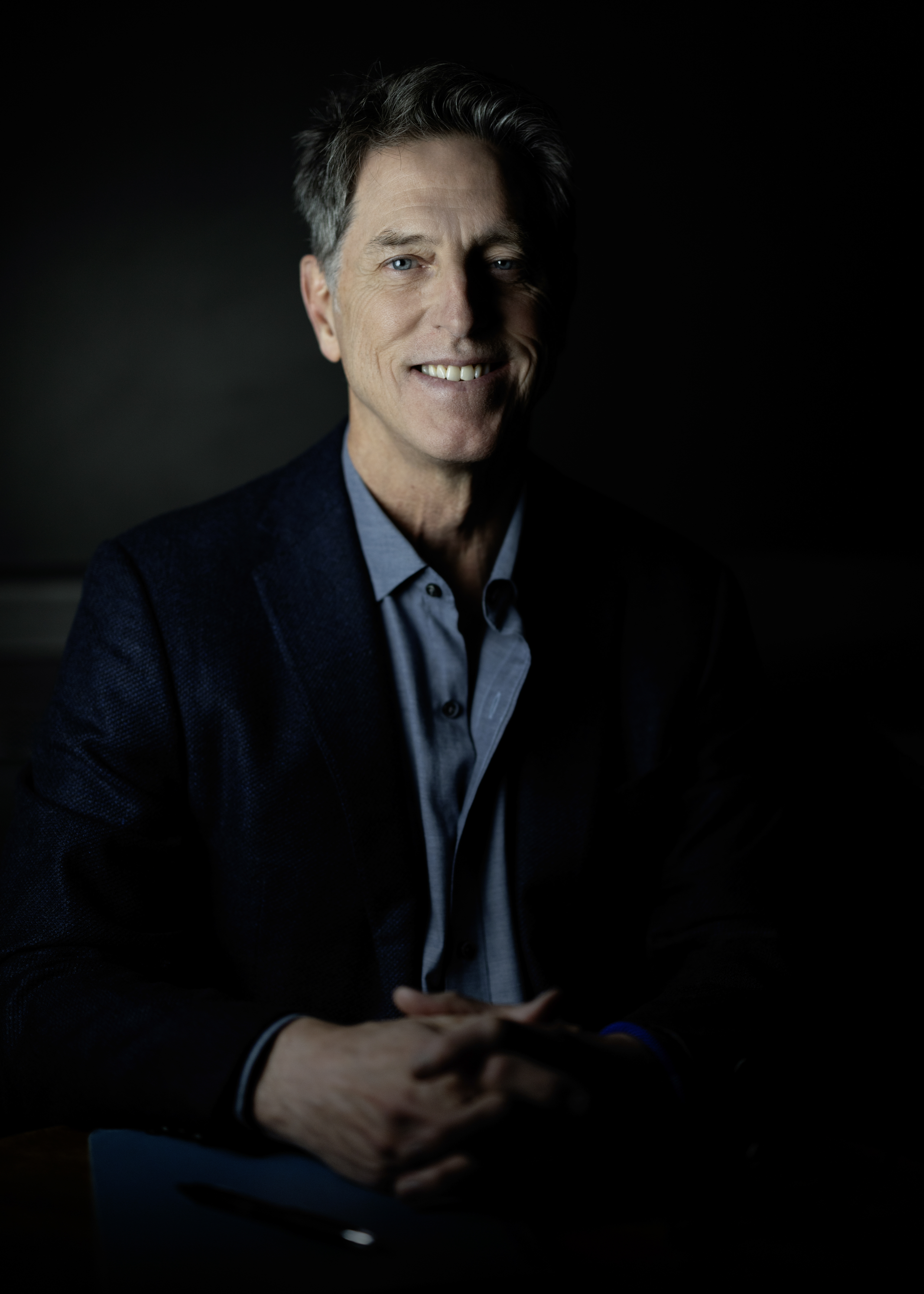
Robert V. Farese Jr in 2025

Robert V. Farese Jr., (born October 29, 1959) is an American physician-scientist and professor of Cell Biology at the Sloan Kettering Institute of Memorial Sloan Kettering. He is an internationally recognized leader in the study of cellular lipid metabolism and has made seminal contributions to our understanding of energy storage as triglycerides in cellular organelles called lipid droplets.

== Education and career ==
Farese received a B.S. in chemistry from the University of Florida and an M.D. from Vanderbilt University School of Medicine. He completed a residency in internal medicine at the University of Colorado School of Medicine and clinical fellowship in Endocrinology and Metabolism at the University of California, San Francisco (UCSF). His postdoctoral research, in the laboratory of Stephen Young at the Gladstone Institutes, applied genetic models to elucidate the role of apolipoprotein B in cholesterol metabolism and disease.

Dr. Farese established his laboratory at the Gladstone Institutes at UCSF, where he made pioneering contributions to the mechanisms of cellular lipid synthesis and storage, cloning the genes for many enzymes of neutral lipid synthesis, including ACAT, DGAT, and MGAT enzymes, and studying their functions in physiology and disease. His laboratory discovered the molecular basis for triglyceride biosynthesis by DGAT1 and DGAT2 enzymes.

Upon meeting Dr. Tobias Walther while on sabbatical in Dr. Peter Walter’s lab at UCSF, Farese and Walther began a longstanding collaboration to unravel the biology of cellular lipid droplets, including how lipid droplets are formed, consumed, how proteins target to their surfaces, and the physiological roles these organelles play in biology. Farese and Walther established a joint laboratory at Harvard School of Public Health and Harvard Medical School in 2014. At Harvard School of Public Health, Farese served as Chair of the Department of Molecular Metabolism. In 2022, Farese and Walther moved their laboratory to the Sloan Kettering Institute of Memorial Sloan Kettering.

Dr. Farese is a co-founder and board member of the Bluefield Project to Cure Frontotemporal Dementia (FTD) Research. His work has been recognized by a Bristol-Myers Squibb “Freedom to Discover Award,” the ASBMB-Avanti Award in Lipids, the Roy Greep Award for outstanding research of the Endocrine Society, the ASBMB-Merck Award for outstanding research, and by election to the American Society for Clinical Investigation, the Association of American Physicians, and Fellow of the American Society for Cell Biology.

== Scientific contributions ==
The Farese laboratory made seminal contributions to the understanding of cellular lipid metabolism. Farese and co-workers, including collaborators at Calgene, discovered the enzymatic basis for triglyceride synthesis via two unrelated enzymes, DGAT1 and DGAT2. Farese's work showed how alterations in lipid synthesis and storage contribute to the pathogenesis of human diseases, in particular type 2 diabetes, liver steatosis, and intestinal fat absorption, and suggested new targets for therapy.

Together with Tobias Walther, Farese has pioneered the cell biology of lipid droplets, the cellular organelle responsible for storing triglycerides and metabolic energy. The group has identified hundreds of genes that govern lipid storage in cells, determined the mechanisms of lipid droplet formation in cells, and elucidated principles on how proteins target to lipid droplets, and studies how lipid droplets are turned over. Drs. Farese and Walther also have identified mechanisms of cellular dysfunction that occur in lipid excess, or lipotoxicity. Their lectures on lipid droplet biology are featured in the online iBiology series.

The Farese and Walther laboratory also studies lipid metabolism and lysosomal dysfunction in the central nervous system. Research has focused on sphingolipid metabolism and how derangements lead to neurodegeneration and diseases such as FTD or amyotrophic lateral sclerosis.

== Awards and honors ==
- American Society for Clinical Investigation (1999)
- Association of American Physicians (2002)
- Freedom to Discover Award, Bristol Myers Squibb (2005)
- Avanti Lipid Award, ASBMB (2016)
- Roy Greep Award for Outstanding Research, Endocrine Society (2018)
- Elected, Fellow of the American Society of Cell Biology (2020)
- ASBMB-Merck Award for Outstanding Research in Biochemistry and Molecular Biology (2022)
