= Ervogastat =

Experimental small-molecule drug

Clinical data
- Other names: PF-06865571

Legal status
- Legal status: Investigational

Identifiers
- IUPAC name: 2-[5-(3-Ethoxypyridin-2-yl)oxypyridin-3-yl]-N-[(3S)-oxolan-3-yl]pyrimidine-5-carboxamide
- CAS Number: 2186700-33-2
- PubChem CID: 134262752
- ChemSpider: 114929473
- UNII: BSOIY5AKQW
- KEGG: D13296
- ChEMBL: ChEMBL4760665

Chemical and physical data
- Formula: C_{21}H_{21}N_{5}O_{4}
- Molar mass: 407.430 g·mol^{−1}
- 3D model (JSmol): Interactive image
- SMILES: CCOC1=C(N=CC=C1)OC2=CN=CC(=C2)C3=NC=C(C=N3)C(=O)N[C@H]4CCOC4
- InChI: InChI=1S/C21H21N5O4/c1-2-29-18-4-3-6-23-21(18)30-17-8-14(9-22-12-17)19-24-10-15(11-25-19)20(27)26-16-5-7-28-13-16/h3-4,6,8-12,16H,2,5,7,13H2,1H3,(H,26,27)/t16-/m0/s1; Key:UKBQFBRPXKGJPY-INIZCTEOSA-N

Ervogastat is an experimental small-molecule drug and selective diacylglycerol O-acyltransferase 2 inhibitor developed by Pfizer for non-alcoholic steatohepatitis. Its development was previously halted by the company but resumed in 2022.

== See also ==
- Clesacostat
