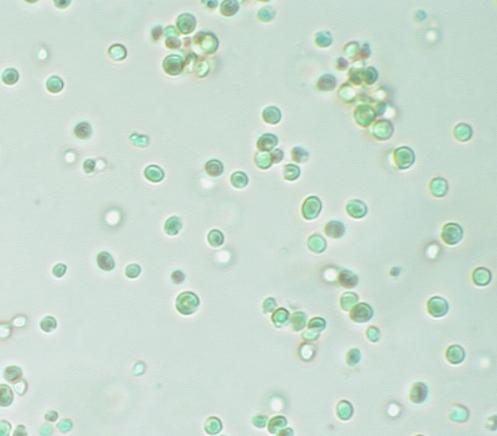
- Nannochloropsis viewed under a light microscope

Scientific classification
- Domain: Eukaryota
- Clade: Sar
- Clade: Stramenopiles
- Division: Ochrophyta
- Class: Eustigmatophyceae
- Order: Eustigmatales
- Family: Monodopsidaceae
- Genus: Nannochloropsis; D.J.Hibberd, 1981

Type species
- Nannochloropsis oculata (Droop 1955) Hibberd 1981

= Nannochloropsis =

Genus of algae

Nannochloropsis is a genus of algae comprising six known species. The genus in the current taxonomic classification was first termed by Hibberd (1981). The species have mostly been known from the marine environment but also occur in fresh and brackish water. All of the species are small, nonmotile spheres which do not express any distinct morphological features that can be distinguished by either light or electron microscopy. The characterisation is mostly done by rbcL gene and 18S rRNA sequence analysis.

The algae of the genus Nannochloropsis differ from other related microalgae in that they have chlorophyll a and completely lack chlorophyll b and chlorophyll c. In addition they are able to build up a high concentrations of a range of pigments such as astaxanthin, zeaxanthin and canthaxanthin. They have a diameter of about 2 to 3 micrometers and a very simple ultrastructure with reduced structural elements compared to neighbouring taxa.

Nannochloropsis is considered a promising alga for industrial applications because of its ability to accumulate high levels of polyunsaturated fatty acids. Moreover, it shows promising features that can allow genetic manipulation aimed at the genetic improvement of the current oleaginous strains. Various species of Nannochloropsis indeed are transfectable and there has been evidence that some strains are able to perform homologous recombination. At the moment it is mainly used as an energy-rich food source for fish larvae and rotifers. Nevertheless, it has raised growing interest also for the investigation of biofuel production from photosynthetic organisms. (see Nannochloropsis and biofuels). Nannochloropsis is actually in use as food additive for human nutrition and it is also served at Restaurant "A Poniente" of El Puerto de Santa María (Cádiz, Spain) close to the natural environment where Nannochloropsis gaditana was first isolated and still grows. A 2020 study suggests it could be used for a highly performant, sustainable fish-free feed for farmed fish.

== Species ==
The species currently recognised are:

- Nannochloropsis australis Fawley, Jameson & Fawley 2015
- Nannochloropsis granulata Karlson & Potter 1996
- Nannochloropsis limnetica Krienitz et al. 2000
- Nannochloropsis oceanica Suda & Miyashita 2002
- Nannochloropsis oculata (Droop 1955) Hibberd 1981

The species Nannochloropsis gaditana and Nannochloropsis salina were reclassified as Microchloropsis gaditana and Microchloropsis salina, respectively, in 2015.

== Sequenced genomes ==
The scientific community has obtained the genomic sequence of different strains of Nannochloropsis belonging to two species: N. gaditana and N. oceanica. A genome portal based on the N. gaditana B-31 genome allows accessing much of the genomic information that concerns this micro-organism, moreover dedicated web pages are also available for the genomes of N. gaditana CCMP526 and N. oceanica CCMP1779.

The genomes of the sequenced Nannochloropsis strains were between 28.5 and 29 Mega bases long, they had high density of genes, reduced intron content, short intergenic regions and very limited presence of repetitive sequences. The genes of the two species share extended similarity.

The analysis of the genomes revealed that these microalgae have set of genes for the synthesis and incorporation in the cell wall of cellulose and sulfated fucans and that they are able to store carbon in polymers of β-1,3- and β-1,6-linked glucose called chrysolaminarin. An NMR analysis of whole algal cells which were cultivated in autotrophic growth reports evidence of the presence of cellulose in the cell wall and of mobile chrysolaminarin, probably accumulated in solution in vacuoles inside the cell.

Comparison between the lipid metabolic genes of N. gaditana and of red/green/brown algae and diatoms provided some insights into the exemplary lipid production of Nannochloropsis cultures. The comparisons indeed highlighted the presence of an expanded repertoire of some of the genes involved in TAG assembly in Nannochloropsis. Numerous TAG lipases, which can affect TAG metabolism through either TAG degradation or lipid remodeling, were identified in Nannochloropsis, many of them belonging to a gene family which seems to be exclusive of Nannochloropsis.

Analysis of the genomic data suggested the presence in both the two species of Nannochloropsis of regulatory RNA and in particular miRNA.

Various orthologs of known blue light sensing proteins were found in the genomes of Nannochloropsis suggesting possible circadian regulation.

A research community from Qingdao Institute of Bioenergy and Bioprocess Technology (QIBEBT ), Chinese Academy of Sciences, sequenced and compared six Nannochloropsis genomes that include two N. oceanica strains (IMET1 and CCMP531) and one strain from each of four other recognized species: N. salina (CCMP537), N. gaditana (CCMP526, which was previously reported), N. oculata (CCMP525) and N. granulata (CCMP529). They found that the six genomes share key oleaginous traits, such as the gene dose expansion of selected lipid biosynthesis genes compared to green algae Chlamydomonas. The most prominent example of gene dose expansion is Diacylglycerol acyltransferase (DGAT), which catalyzes the last step of triacylglycerol (TAG) synthesis. There are 13 DGAT genes in Nannochloropsis, representing the highest gene dose in known genomes.

Through a comprehensive phylogenetic analysis, researchers proposed that among the 11 DGAT-2s, one gene might originate from the red algae related secondary endosymbiont, four from green algae related endosymbiont, and the other six from the eukaryotic host genome. In addition, a large proportion (15.3%) of TAG biosynthesis related genes were acquired by Nannochloropsis via horizontal gene transfer (HGT) from bacteria. Therefore, multiple genome pooling and horizontal genetic exchange, together with selective inheritance of lipid synthesis genes and species-specific gene loss, have led to the enormous genetic apparatus for oleaginousness and the wide genomic divergence among present-day Nannochloropsis spp.

== Accumulation of oil in nitrogen deprivation ==
When cultured in normal growth conditions in f/2 medium, a standard algal culture growth medium, supplemented with nitrogen, Nannochloropsis cells have an oil content of about 30% of their dry weight. This oil can be used to produce biodiesel. In order to produce biodiesel, the oil content of Nannochloropsis cultures must be increased. Fatty acid biosynthesis in N. oceanica was shown to be integrated with the regulation of the cholesterol biosynthetic pathway, suggesting new genetic engineering or chemical biology approaches for enhanced oil production in microalgae. On the other hand, various culturing conditions were observed to increase the average oil content per cell, supporting however only slow growth rates of the cultures (see the related section Nannochloropsis and biofuels), and decreasing the overall productivity. Among these conditions, nitrogen deprivation has been one of the most vastly studied. Studies have examined the behaviour of the cultures in nitrogen stress in various culturing set-ups, as well as the physiological and molecular response of the cells to nitrogen deprivation.

Various strains of Nannochloropsis were shown to accumulate up to 60–70% of their overall biomass as lipids in nitrogen limitation. In this condition not only the amount of lipids changes, but also the composition. It was observed that triacylglycerols largely increase in nitrogen depletion while other lipids, mainly polar glycerolipids, free fatty acids and diacylglycerols, slightly decrease. The increase in triacylglycerols in nitrogen depletion is much larger than the decrease in the other glycerolipids, supporting the hypothesis that the cells actively synthesise new triacylglycerols rather than just transforming the existing lipids into triacylglycerols.

While triacylglycerols accumulate and lipid droplets enlarge, other important morphological changes take place. The chloroplasts became smaller and the amount of lipids that are characteristic of the photosynthetic membranes decrease significantly. Photosynthetic yield decreases in the nitrogen depleted cells, but it is still sufficient to drive cell survival and growth. If photosynthesis is inhibited indeed, Nannochloropsis cells stop growing, indicating that they rely on photosynthetic solar energy conversion and not on stored carbohydrates or lipids as energy source.

Nannochloropsis cultivated in normal growth condition and deprived of a nitrogen source continues growing for 4–5 days. The analysis of gene expression reveals that mechanisms for nitrogen assimilation and redistribution are activated in the cells in nitrogen scarcity and allow survival through a partial reorganisation of the cellular metabolism. The genes responsible for the incorporation of free ammonium into glutamate (L-glutamine + 2-oxoglutarate + NADPH + H^{+} ←→ 2 L-glutamate + NADP^{+}) are up-regulated . Their up-regulation increases the capability of the cells to assimilate minimal amount of ammonium eventually present in the medium and, more importantly, allows them to assimilate the intracellular ammonium that can be released by degradative processes. Transcriptomic data of nitrogen-deprived Nannochloropsis cultures show that various enzymes responsible for degradative processes that release ammonium are indeed up regulated. Moreover, the expression of genes coding for proteins involved in controlled degradation of proteins increase, together with others involved in the formation of cytosolic sequestering vesicles used for degradation and recycling of cellular components.

The machinery of gene expression of chloroplast and mitochondrion is down regulated in Nannochloropsis in response to nitrogen depletion.

Corteggiani Carpinelli and coworkers (2013) report a complete analysis of the gene expression of Nannochloropsis cultures grown in normal conditions and nitrogen deprivation for 3 days and 6 days. Data on similar conditions were also collected by Radakovits et al. (2012) and Vieler et al. (2012). All of this data show that genes involved in fatty acid and triacylglycerol biosynthesis are always abundant in the cells and their expression is not correlated with the amount of oil accumulated. Also the expression of the genes involved in triacylglycerols degradation is not significantly down-regulated as triacylglycerols accumulate. The general conclusion suggested by the experimental data is that Nannochloropsis constitutively produces triacylglycerols and that the metabolic reorganisation that follows nitrogen deprivation increases the flux of substrates through this pathway, which is in turn capable to sustain the increased metabolic flux. Corteggiani Carpinelli and coworkers (2013) advance the hypothesis that, in their experimental conditions, photosynthesis is the main energy source and the down-regulation of the metabolic activity of the mitochondrion is determinant in increasing the amount of substrates that enter the fatty acid biosynthetic pathway. If more precursors are available, more fatty acids are synthesised and as a consequence more triacylglycerols are produced and accumulated into the cells as oil droplets.

Dong et al. (2013) report a quantification of the abundance of various proteins in cultures of Nannochloropsis grown with a supplement of CO_{2} and deprived of nitrogen. Despite the different experimental conditions, also the proteomic study seems to support the hypothesis that the accumulation of triacylglycerols is due to an increase of the metabolic flux through the fatty acid biosynthetic pathway. The authors advance the hypothesis that, in their experimental conditions, the degradation of storage sugars and the up-regulation of glycolysis are responsible for the increase of substrates through the pathway.

More recently Li and coworkers (2014) collected extensive experimental data from cultures of Nannochloropsis oculata IMET1 grown in nitrogen sufficient and nitrogen depleted media. According to their analysis it is the catabolism of carbohydrates and proteins together with the up-regulation of genes assigned to various pathways (the cytosolic glycolysis pathway, which produces pyruvate; the PDHC bypass, which yields additional acetyl-CoA; and the coupling of TCA reactions with mitochondrial β-oxidation) that have to be claimed for increasing the supply of carbon precursors to the fatty acid biosynthetic pathway. Nevertheless, the authors suggest that it isn't the increased synthesis of fatty acids that leads to accumulation of oil inside the cells, but it is rather the up-regulation of genes involved in the assembly of triacylglycerols that determines the final oil concentration. In other words, under nitrogen depletion, it is the up-regulation of the transcript level of the key genes in triacylglycerol assembly, rather than those in fatty acids biosynthesis, that leads to accelerated triacylglycerol production.

In 2017, a study jointly funded by ExxonMobil and Synthetic Genomics achieved a breakthrough in lipid percentages in Nannochloropsis gaditana through applications of the CRISPR-Cas9 reverse-genetics pipeline and nitrogen starving—improving partitioning of total carbon to lipids from 20% (wild type) to 40-45% (mutant type).

Research finds Nannochloropsis also accumulate under UV-B vitamins D_{3} and K_{2}, suggesting they may offer a new, vegan, natural, and sustainable source for them.

== See also ==
- Microalgae
- Planktonic algae
- Nannochloropsis and biofuels
- Biofuel
- Sustainable aviation fuel
- Energy content of biofuel
