= Diglyceride acyltransferase =

Class of enzymes

diacylglycerol O-acyltransferase

Identifiers
- EC no.: 2.3.1.20
- CAS no.: 9029-98-5

Databases
- BRENDA: enzyme data
- ExPASy: NiceZyme view
- KEGG: enzyme entry
- MetaCyc: metabolic pathway
- Rhea: reactions
- PDB structures: RCSB PDB PDBe PDBsum
- Gene Ontology: AmiGO / QuickGO
Search
- PMC: articles
- PubMed: articles
- NCBI: proteins

diacylglycerol O-acyltransferase 1

Identifiers
- Symbol: DGAT1
- NCBI gene: 8694
- HGNC: 2843
- OMIM: 604900
- RefSeq: NM_012079
- UniProt: O75907

Other data
- Locus: Chr. 8 q24.3
Search for
- Structures: Swiss-model
- Domains: InterPro

Diglyceride acyltransferase (or O-acyltransferase), DGAT, catalyzes the formation of triglycerides (triacylglycerols) from diacylglycerol and acyl-CoA. The reaction catalyzed by DGAT is considered the terminal and only committed step in the acyl-CoA-dependent triglyceride synthesis, universally important in animal, plants, and microorganisms. The conversion is essential for intestinal absorption (i.e. DGAT1) and adipose tissue formation (i.e. DGAT2) in mammalian. DGAT1 are homologous to other membrane-bound O-acyltransferases, but not all other DGATs.

== Isoforms ==
Two important DGAT isozymes are encoded by the genes DGAT1 and DGAT2. Although both isozymes catalyze similar reactions, they share no sequence homology, which is similar to other DGATs reported in various organisms. The location of DGAT1 and DGAT2 in other organisms, as well as other DGATs have been reported in various literatures.

DGAT1 is mainly located in absorptive enterocyte cells that line the intestine and duodenum where it reassembles triglycerides that were decomposed through lipolysis in the process of intestinal absorption. DGAT1 reconstitutes triglycerides in a committed step after which they are packaged together with cholesterol and proteins to form chylomicrons.

DGAT2 is mainly located in fat, liver and skin cells.

== Knockout studies in mice ==
Mice with genetic disruption of the DGAT1 or DGAT2 genes have been made by the Farese laboratory at UCSF. Surprisingly, DGAT1^{−/−} mice are healthy and fertile and have no changes in triglyceride levels. These mice are also lean and resistant to diet-induced obesity, consequently generating interest in DGAT1 inhibitors for the treatment of obesity. However, these mice also fail to lactate, showing a complete lack of milk production due to their inability to produce milk lipid droplets. In contrast, DGAT2^{−/−} mice have reduced triglyceride levels but are lipopenic, suffer from skin barrier abnormalities (including the inability to retain moisture), and die shortly after birth.

== Therapeutic application ==
DGAT1 inhibitors have potential for the treatment of obesity and a number of DGAT-1 inhibitors are in clinical trials for this indication.

DGAT is also important in lipid biotechnology in plants, microorganisms, and animals.
