= HHIPL1 =

Protein-coding gene in the species Homo sapiens

Identifiers
- Aliases: HHIPL1, KIAA1822, UNQ9245, HHIP like 1
- External IDs: MGI: 1919265; GeneCards: HHIPL1

Gene location (Human)
Chr.	Chromosome 14 (human)
Band	14q32.2	Start	99,645,129 bp
Band	14q32.2	End	99,680,569 bp

Gene location (Mouse)
Chr.	Chromosome 12 (mouse)
Band	12|12 F1	Start	108,272,529 bp
Band	12|12 F1	End	108,297,128 bp
RNA expression pattern
Bgee	Human / Mouse (ortholog); Top expressed in: caudate nucleus; cingulate gyrus; anterior cingulate cortex; putamen; right frontal lobe; ventricular zone; amygdala; nucleus accumbens; prefrontal cortex; Brodmann area 9 / Top expressed in: decidua; stroma of bone marrow; gastrula; lumbar subsegment of spinal cord; ventricular zone; uterus; visual cortex; superior frontal gyrus; facial motor nucleus; lateral hypothalamus; More reference expression data
BioGPS	n/a
Gene ontology
Molecular function	scavenger receptor activity; catalytic activity; molecular function
Cellular component	extracellular region; membrane; cellular component
Biological process	receptor-mediated endocytosis; biological process; vesicle-mediated transport; endocytosis
Sources:Amigo / QuickGO
Orthologs
Databases	NCBI: entry; OMA: entry
Species	Human	Mouse
Entrez	84439	214305
Ensembl	ENSG00000182218	ENSMUSG00000021260
UniProt	Q96JK4	Q14DK5
RefSeq (mRNA)	NM_001127258; NM_032425; NM_001329411	NM_001044380
RefSeq (protein)	NP_001120730; NP_001316340; NP_115801	NP_001037845
Location (UCSC)	Chr 14: 99.65 – 99.68 Mb	Chr 12: 108.27 – 108.3 Mb
PubMed search
- Wikidata
View/Edit Human	View/Edit Mouse

HHIP-like protein 1 (HHIPL1), also known as HHIP2, is a protein that in humans is encoded by the HHIPL1 gene on chromosome 14. It is not significantly expressed in many tissues and cell types, though HHIPL1 mRNA has been detected in trabecular bone cells. Little is known about the precise biological function of HHIPL1, but the protein has been linked to adenomas. The HHIPL1 gene also contains one of 27 SNPs associated with increased risk of coronary artery disease.

== Structure ==
=== Gene ===
The HHIPL1 gene resides on chromosome 14 at the band 14q32 and contains 13 exons. This gene produces 2 isoforms through alternative splicing.

=== Protein ===
This protein belongs to the HHIP family and is one of three members found in humans. HHIPL1 contains a SRCR domain and an N-terminal signal peptide. Processing of the signal peptide leads to this protein's secretion. As an HHIP member, it also contains a conserved HHIP-homologous (HIPH) domain composed of 18 cysteine residues.

== Function ==
The function of HHIPL1 is not known. The section below refers to the function of HHIP.

The function of HHIP is not well known but has been shown to be tightly associated with lung function. Knocking out HHIP in mice is neonatally lethal due to defective branching in the lung. The heterozygous knockout of HHIP has been shown to contribute to more severe emphysema induced by cigarette smoke compared to wild type mice. Furthermore, increased spontaneous emphysema and oxidative stress levels have been found in the lungs of HHIP heterozygous mice. Both the expression level and enhancer activity of HHIP is reduced in chronic obstructive pulmonary disease (COPD) lungs, suggesting a protective role of HHIP in COPD pathogenesis.

== Clinical significance ==
DNA methylation is one of several epigenetic modifications recognized as hallmarks of tumorigenesis. In a genome-wide survey of subtype-specific epigenomic changes in adenoma, the HHIPL1 gene was hypermethylated in 12 of 13 non-functioning (NF) adenomas, as well as in growth hormone (GH)- and prolectin-secreting adenomas. Thus, HHIPL1 has the potential to serve as a biomarker to predict or characterise tumorous growth patterns. Unlike another member of the human HHIP gene family, HHIP, which is regarded as a pharmacogenomics target in the fields of oncology and vascular medicine, HHIPL1 has yet been reported with such potential.

Additionally, in the cardiovascular field, HHIPL1 has been associated with CAD in Europeans, South Asians, and a population of Japanese. However, in another study based on a Japanese population, the association failed to be replicated, suggesting that this association is population-specific.

=== Clinical marker ===
A multi-locus genetic risk score study based on a combination of 27 loci, including the HHIFL1 gene, identified individuals at increased risk for both incident and recurrent coronary artery disease events, as well as an enhanced clinical benefit from statin therapy. The study was based on a community cohort study (the Malmo Diet and Cancer study) and four additional randomized controlled trials of primary prevention cohorts (JUPITER and ASCOT) and secondary prevention cohorts (CARE and PROVE IT-TIMI 22).
