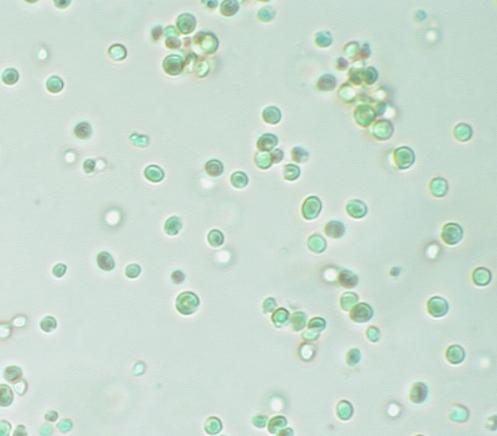
- Nannochloropsis sp.

Scientific classification
- Domain: Eukaryota
- Clade: Sar
- Clade: Stramenopiles
- Clade: Ochrophyta
- Clade: Chrysista
- Class: Eustigmatophyceae; Hibberd & Leedale, 1971

Orders
- Eustigmatales; Goniochloridales

= Eustigmatophyte =

Group of algae with marine, freshwater, and soil-living species

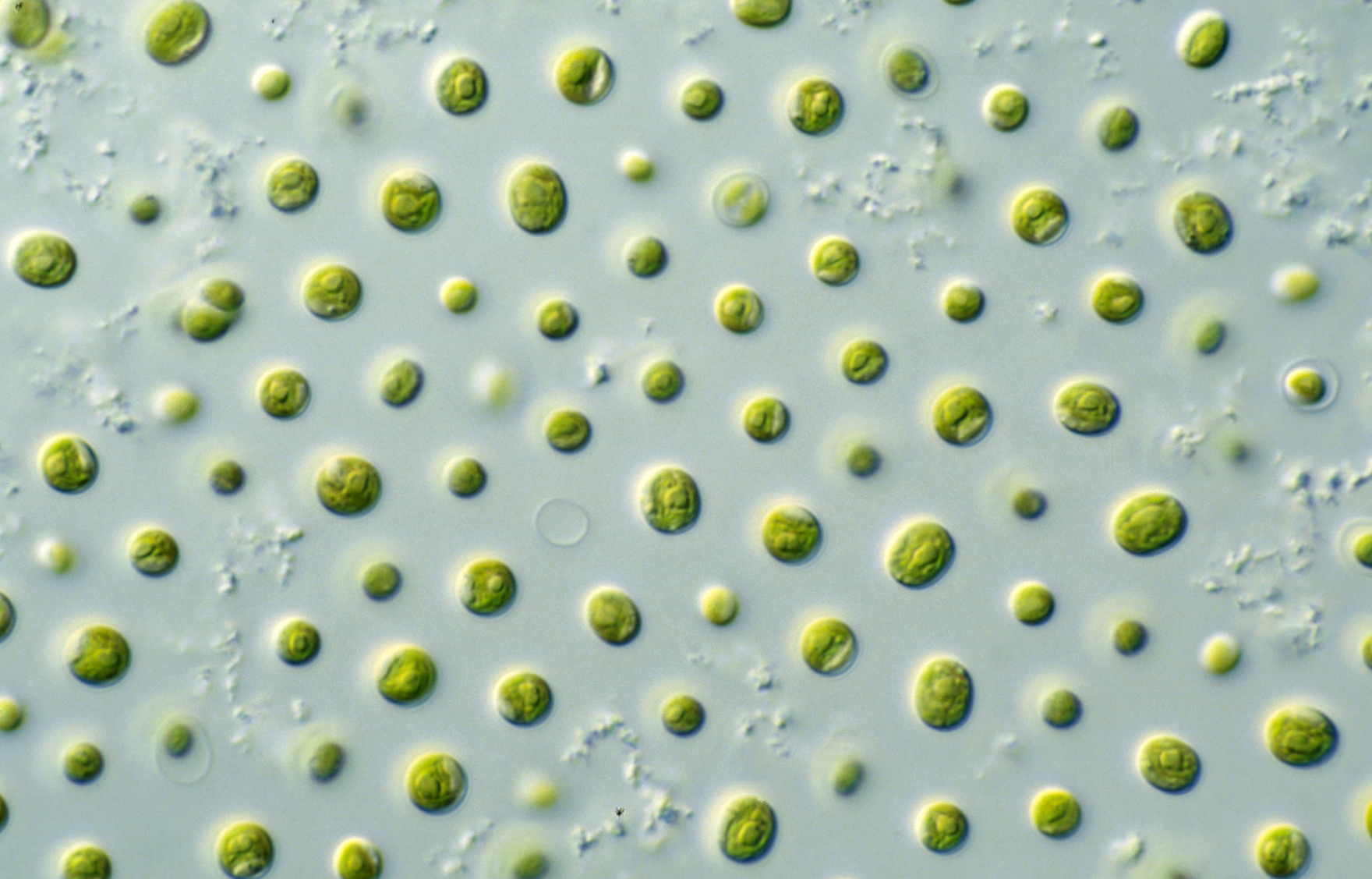
Nannochloropsis sp.

Eustigmatophytes are a small group (17 genera; ~107 species) of eukaryotic forms of algae that includes marine, freshwater and soil-living species.

All eustigmatophytes are unicellular, with coccoid cells and polysaccharide cell walls. Eustigmatophytes contain one or more yellow-green chloroplasts, which contain chlorophyll a and the accessory pigments violaxanthin and β-carotene. Eustigmatophyte zoids (gametes) possess a single or pair of flagella, originating from the apex of the cell. Unlike other heterokontophytes, eustigmatophyte zoids do not have typical photoreceptive organelles (or eyespots); instead an orange-red eyespot outside a chloroplast is located at the anterior end of the zoid.

Ecologically, eustigmatophytes occur as photosynthetic autotrophs across a range of systems. Most eustigmatophyte genera live in freshwater or in soil, although Nannochloropsis contains marine species of picophytoplankton (2–4 μm).

The class was erected to include some algae previously classified in the Xanthophyceae.

== Classification ==
- Class Eustigmatophyceae Hibberd & Leedale 1970
  - Order Eustigmatales Hibberd 1981
    - Genus Paraeustigmatos Fawley, Nemcová, & Fawley 2019
    - Family Eustigmataceae Hibberd 1981 [Chlorobothryaceae Pascher 1925; Pseudocharaciopsidaceae Lee & Bold ex Hibberd 1981]
      - Genus ?Ellipsoidion Pascher 1937
      - Genus Chlorobotrys Bohlin 1901
      - Genus Eustigmatos Hibberd 1981
      - Genus Pseudocharaciopsis Lee & Bold 1973
      - Genus Pseudostaurastrum Chodat 1921
      - Genus Vischeria Pascher 1938 - 16 spp.
    - Family Monodopsidaceae Hibberd 1981 [Loboceae Hegewald 2007]
      - Genus Microchloropsis Fawley, Jameson & Fawley 2015
      - Genus Monodopsis Hibberd 1981
      - Genus Nannochloropsis Hibberd 1981
      - Genus Pseudotetraedriella Hegewald & Padisák 2007
    - Family Neomonodaceae Amaral et al. 2020
      - Genus ?Botryochloropsis Preisig & Wilhelm 1989
      - Genus Characiopsiella Amaral et al. 2020
      - Genus Munda Amaral et al. 2020
      - Genus Neomonodus Amaral et al. 2020
      - Genus Pseudellipsoidion Neustupa & Nemková 2001
  - Order Goniochloridales Fawley, Elias & Fawley 2013
    - Family Goniochloridaceae
      - Genus Goniochloris Geitler 1928
      - Genus Pseudostaurastrum Chodat 1921
      - Genus Tetraedriella Pascher 1930
      - Genus Trachydiscus H.Ettl 1964
      - Genus Vacuoliviride Nakayama et al. 2015

== Phylogeny ==
Phylogeny of Eustigmatophyceae based on the work of Amaral et al 2020

- - Goniochloridales
    - Goniochloridaceae
      - - Goniochloris
        - Trachydiscus
      - - Vacuoliviride
        - - Pseudostaurastrum
          - Tetraedriella
  - Eustigmatales
    - Paraeustigmatos
    - - Neomonodaceae
        - Pseudellipsoidion
        - - Characiopsiella
          - - Munda
            - Neomonodus
      - - Monodopsidaceae
          - - Pseudotetraedriella
            - Monodopsis
          - - Microchloropsis
            - Nannochloropsis
        - Eustigmataceae
          - Pseudocharaciopsis
          - - Chlorobotrys
            - - Eustigmatos
              - Eustigmatos
