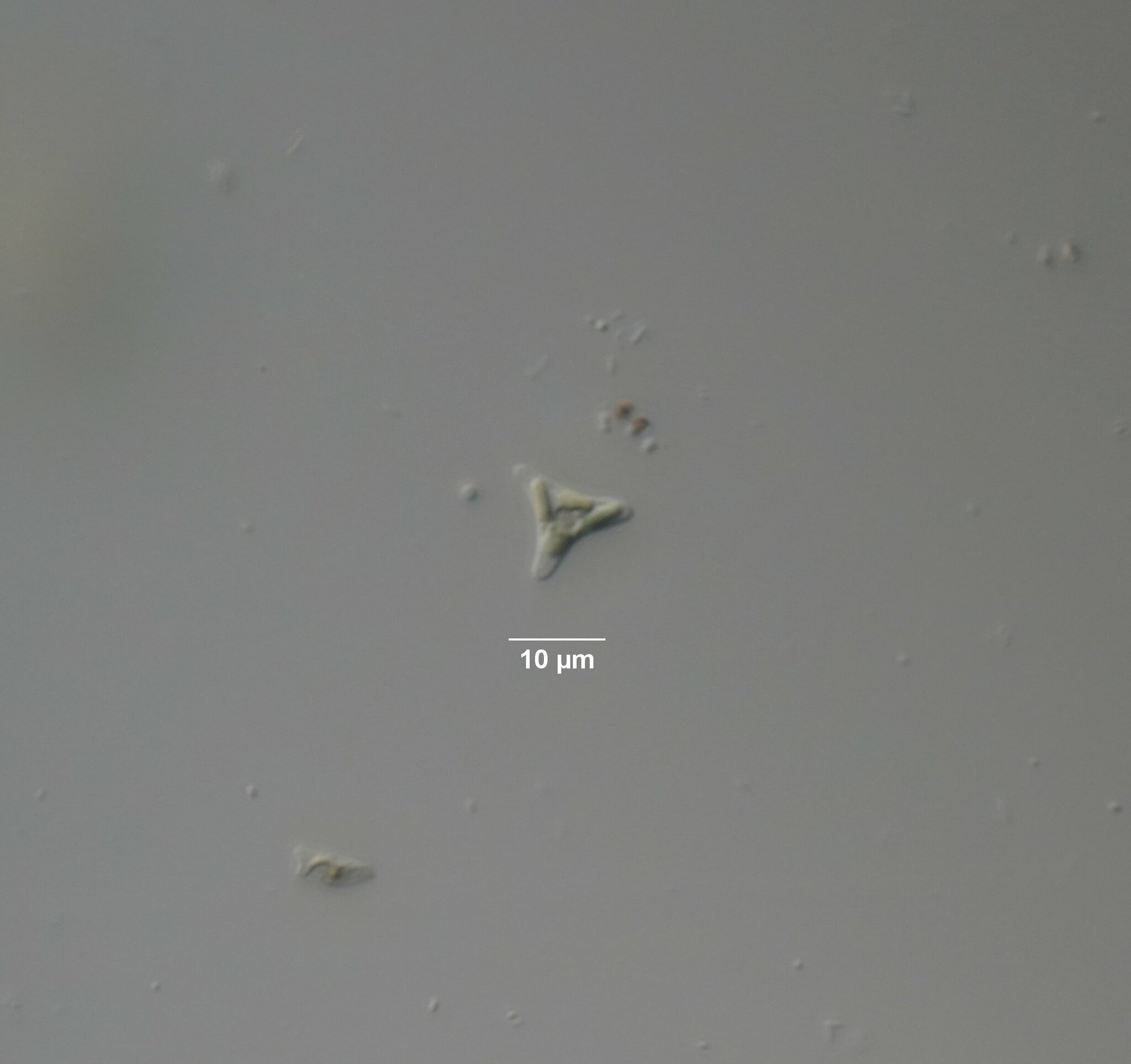
- Goniochloris mutica

Scientific classification
- Domain: Eukaryota
- Clade: Diaphoretickes
- Clade: SAR
- Clade: Stramenopiles
- Phylum: Gyrista
- Subphylum: Ochrophytina
- Class: Eustigmatophyceae
- Order: Goniochloridales
- Family: Goniochloridaceae
- Genus: Goniochloris; Geitler, 1928

Extant species
- See text

= Goniochloris =

Genus of Chromista

Goniochloris is a genus of Chromista belonging to the family Pleurochloridaceae.

The genus was first described by Lothar Geitler in 1928.

Species:

- Goniochloris brevispinosa
- Goniochloris closterioides
- Goniochloris cochleata
- Goniochloris gigas
- Goniochloris irregularis
- Goniochloris laevis
- Goniochloris minuta
- Goniochloris mutica
- Goniochloris parvula
- Goniochloris pseudogigas
- Goniochloris pulchra
- Goniochloris sculpta
- Goniochloris triradiata
- Goniochloris triverruca
