= LPCAT3 =

Human enzyme

Identifiers
- Aliases: LPCAT3, C3F, LPCAT, LPLAT 5, LPSAT, MBOAT5, OACT5, nessy, lysophosphatidylcholine acyltransferase 3
- External IDs: OMIM: 611950; MGI: 1315211; GeneCards: LPCAT3
Enzyme activity
| EC # | BRENDA | ExPASy | KEGG | MetaCyc |
|---|---|---|---|---|
| 2.3.1.23 | ↗ | ↗ | ↗ | ↗ |

Gene location (Human)
| Chr. | Chromosome 12 (human) |
| Band | 12p13.31 | Start | 6,976,185 bp |
| Band | 12p13.31 | End | 7,018,477 bp |

Gene location (Mouse)
| Chr. | Chromosome 6 (mouse) |
| Band | 6 F2|6 59.17 cM | Start | 124,639,990 bp |
| Band | 6 F2|6 59.17 cM | End | 124,681,381 bp |
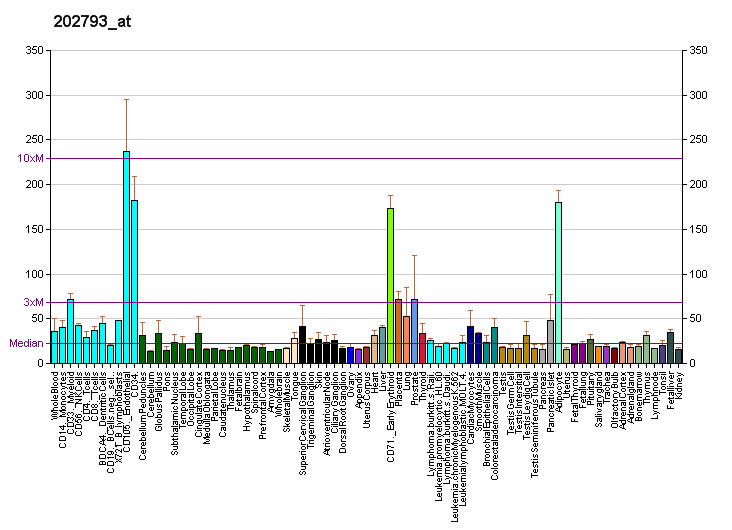
RNA expression pattern
| Bgee | Human / Mouse (ortholog); Top expressed in: right lobe of liver; right adrenal gland; mucosa of transverse colon; body of stomach; rectum; right adrenal cortex; left adrenal gland; body of pancreas; left adrenal cortex; islet of Langerhans / Top expressed in: yolk sac; lip; jejunum; right kidney; duodenum; skin of external ear; ileum; seminal vesicula; epithelium of small intestine; transitional epithelium of urinary bladder; More reference expression data |
| BioGPS | More reference expression data |
Gene ontology
| Molecular function | transferase activity; 1-acylglycerophosphocholine O-acyltransferase activity; acyltransferase activity; 2-acylglycerol-3-phosphate O-acyltransferase activity; 1-acylglycerol-3-phosphate O-acyltransferase activity |
| Cellular component | integral component of membrane; endoplasmic reticulum membrane; membrane; endoplasmic reticulum |
| Biological process | phosphatidylserine acyl-chain remodeling; phosphatidylethanolamine acyl-chain remodeling; phosphatidylcholine acyl-chain remodeling; regulation of plasma lipoprotein particle levels; lipid metabolism; phospholipid biosynthetic process; phospholipid metabolic process |
Sources:Amigo / QuickGO
Orthologs
| Databases | NCBI: entry; OMA: entry |
| Species | Human | Mouse |
| Entrez | 10162 | 14792 |
| Ensembl | ENSG00000111684 | ENSMUSG00000004270 |
| UniProt | Q6P1A2 | Q91V01 |
| RefSeq (mRNA) | NM_005768 | NM_145130 |
| RefSeq (protein) | NP_005759 | NP_660112 |
| Location (UCSC) | Chr 12: 6.98 – 7.02 Mb | Chr 6: 124.64 – 124.68 Mb |
| PubMed search |
- Wikidata
| View/Edit Human | View/Edit Mouse |

Lysophospholipid acyltransferase 5 is an enzyme that in humans is encoded by the LPCAT3 gene. It is homologous to other membrane-bound O-acyltransferases.

== Structure and function ==
Based on the crystalographic and cryo-EM studies of its homolog in chicken (cLPCAT3), humane MBOAT5 has a typical MBOAT folding as other members such as SOAT1 and DGAT1, and the transmembrane helices hold a "T"-shape reaction chamber allowing the co-occupancy of a lysophosphatidylcholine (lysoPC) and a long polyunsaturated acyl-CoA, such as arachidonic acyl CoA. With the assistance of catalytic residues H374 and N338, the acyl chain could be transferred from the acyl CoA to the sn-2 position of lysoPC, thereby generating a new, polyunsaturated phospholipid.

Inhibition of LPCAT3 has been found to alter the cellular lipidome and is partially protective against ferroptosis.
