= HHAT =

Protein-coding gene found in humans

Identifiers
- Aliases: HHAT, MART2, SKI1, Skn, hedgehog acyltransferase, NNMS
- External IDs: OMIM: 605743; MGI: 2444681; GeneCards: HHAT

Gene location (Human)
Chr.	Chromosome 1 (human)
Band	1q32.2	Start	210,328,252 bp
Band	1q32.2	End	210,676,296 bp

Gene location (Mouse)
Chr.	Chromosome 1 (mouse)
Band	1|1 H6	Start	192,179,019 bp
Band	1|1 H6	End	192,453,531 bp
RNA expression pattern
Bgee	Human / Mouse (ortholog); Top expressed in: testicle; olfactory zone of nasal mucosa; gonad; right adrenal cortex; left adrenal gland; stromal cell of endometrium; left adrenal cortex; right uterine tube; gallbladder; islet of Langerhans / Top expressed in: lumbar spinal ganglion; zygote; tail of embryo; secondary oocyte; genital tubercle; primary oocyte; embryo; calvaria; renal corpuscle; cumulus cell; More reference expression data
BioGPS	n/a
Gene ontology
Molecular function	acyltransferase activity; nucleotide binding; palmitoyltransferase activity; GTP binding; transferase activity; O-acyltransferase activity
Cellular component	endoplasmic reticulum membrane; membrane; integral component of membrane; endoplasmic reticulum
Biological process	smoothened signaling pathway; multicellular organism development; protein palmitoylation
Sources:Amigo / QuickGO
Orthologs
Databases	NCBI: entry; OMA: entry
Species	Human	Mouse
Entrez	55733	226861
Ensembl	ENSG00000054392; ENSG00000280680	ENSMUSG00000037375
UniProt	Q5VTY9	Q8BMT9
RefSeq (mRNA)	NM_001122834; NM_001170564; NM_001170580; NM_001170587; NM_001170588 NM_018194	NM_144881
RefSeq (protein)	NP_001116306; NP_001164035; NP_001164051; NP_001164058; NP_001164059 NP_060664	NP_659130
Location (UCSC)	Chr 1: 210.33 – 210.68 Mb	Chr 1: 192.18 – 192.45 Mb
PubMed search
- Wikidata
View/Edit Human	View/Edit Mouse

Hedgehog acyltransferase (HHAT), also called skinny hedgehog homology in humans, is a protein that in humans is encoded by the gene HHAT.

The HHAT gene encodes an enzyme that catalyzes N-terminal palmitoylation of sonic hedgehog. Mutations in HHAT produce a phenotype that is similar to loss of hedgehog function. Finally the HHAT protein shares a short but significant sequence similarity to membrane-bound O-acyltransferases.
