= Nannochloropsis and biofuels =

Genus of algae investigated for biofuel production

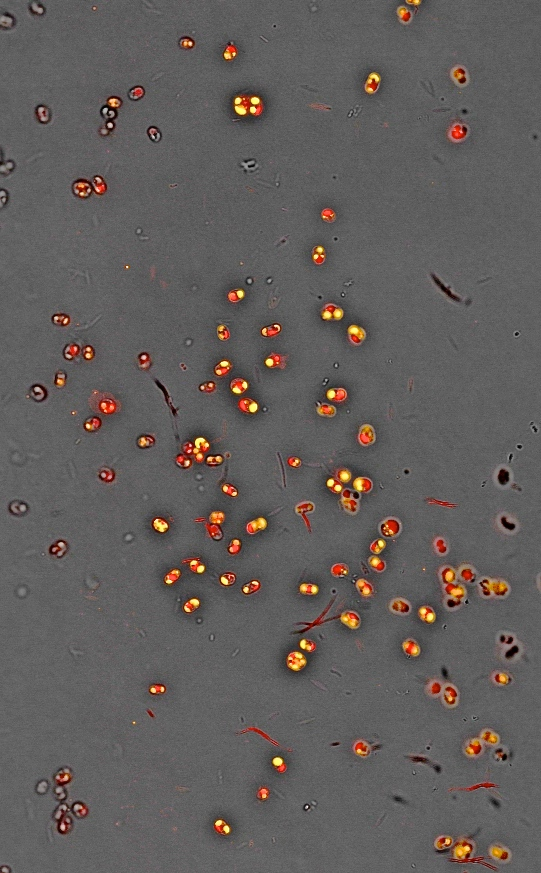
Oil accumulation in Nannochloropsis cultures. In red the chlorophyll, in yellow the oil. In the majority of the cells of this culture oil represents a substantial fraction of the cell volume. The picture was shot using a confocal microscope by Elisa Corteggiani Carpinelli and the method used is the same described in Corteggiani Carpinelli, E. et al., (2013)

Nannochloropsis is a genus of alga within the heterokont line of eukaryotes, that is being investigated for biofuel production. One marine Nannochloropsis species has been shown to be suitable for algal biofuel production due to its ease of growth and high oil content (28.7% of dry weight), mainly unsaturated fatty acids and a significant percentage of palmitic acid. It also contains enough unsaturated fatty acid linolenic acid and polyunsaturated acid (>4 double bonds) for a quality biodiesel.

== Conditions that lead to oil content increase ==
Oil productivity is defined as the oil produced by the algae per day per liter of culture, which is dependent on both growth rate and lipid content. Growth rate indicates how rapid the algae grow and lipid content indicates the percentage of dry weight that is lipid. In most of the studies, these two factors are investigated independently. Under normal growth conditions, Nannochloropsis does not reach its optimal oil production. Several conditions, including stress conditions, have been reported to increase oil content in Nannochloropsis.

=== Nitrogen deprivation ===
Nitrogen is essential for algal growth. Within a cell, nitrogen is involved in synthesizing amino acids, nucleic acids, chlorophyll, and other nitrogen-containing organic compounds. In a study in which 30 different microalgal strains were screened, one Nannochloropsis strain was shown to obtain 60% lipid content after nitrogen deprivation, up from 30% under normal growth conditions. This strain was selected for further scale-up experiments in a photobioreactor under natural sunlight. Lipid productivity increased to 204 milligram per liter per day(mg/L/day) under nitrogen starvation conditions, almost twice as much as the 117 mg/L/day under sufficient nutrition conditions. Based on these results, a two-phase cultivation process, with a nutrient sufficient phase to rapidly increase number of cells prior to a nitrogen deprived phase to boost lipid content, was found to produce more than 90 kg of lipid per hectare per day in outdoor cultures. I, depending on sun light conditions.

=== Carbon dioxide aeration ===
Algae play an important role in earth's carbon cycle. Algae generate large deposits of carbonate minerals and organic compounds that are resistant to microbial breakdown, thereby contributing to the reduction of CO_{2} level in the atmosphere, making the earth more habitable for other organisms. The CO_{2} concentration also has an effect on algae growth and lipid content. In Nannochloropsis oculata, the effect of CO_{2} concentration on biomass production and lipid accumulation was investigated. The results showed that the lipid content of N. oculata increased from 30.8% to 50.4% upon 2% CO_{2} aeration. Thus, this algal strain is recommended to be grown with 2% CO_{2} to maximize lipid production.

=== Blue light and Ultraviolet A (UV-A) ===
A light-acquisition problem exists for aquatic algae since submergence can reduce light intensity and dampen photosynthesis. For land plants, full-spectrum of sunlight, from blue to red light, is available for chlorophyll absorption. However, red light is absorbed in the few meters of water closest to the surface of an aquatic environment and the light environment beneath these few meters is mainly blue-green in quality. Algal cells are likely to be transported to such depth of water, and many have evolved a mechanism to better absorb blue-green light. A Nannochloropsis species isolated from Singapore's coastal water was investigated under different light wavelengths (red, green, blue, and white) and intensities to determine the optimal condition for biomass productivity and lipid production. The maximum fatty acid yield was achieved for both phototrophic (sunlight is the only energy source) and mixotrophic (utilize both sunlight and energy from carbon source) cultures at 55.15 and 111.96 mg/L, respectively, under cell exposure to blue light (470 nm). The biomass productivity of the algae also peaked under blue light for both cultures.

In another study, UV-A (320 - 400 nm) was added to the photosynthetically active light spectrum (400 - 700 nm) to culture Nannochloropsis in order to study the effect of UV-A on growth and lipid accumulation. The results showed that modulated UV-A usage can lead to an increase in growth rate.

=== Alginate oligosaccharides ===
Alginate, or alginic acid, is a natural acidic linear polysaccharide derived from seaweed. It is composed of α-L-guluronate and β-D-mannuronate. Bulk alginate is widely used in the food industry and for medical purposes due to its unique characteristics such as high viscosity in aqueous solution and gel-forming property in the presence of calcium ions. Previous studies have also shown that alginate oligosaccharides may act as growth promoting agents on some plant cells. The effect of an alginate oligosaccharide mixture (AOM) on N. oculata was studied. The growth rate of this alga was significantly increased by AOM. Moreover, AOM appeared to alleviate the algicidal effect of Cu^{2+} significantly. These results suggests that AOM can be used a growth promoting supplement for N. oculata culture.

=== Temperature ===
Temperature has significant impact on algal growth rate, cell size, and biochemical composition. Either in natural habitats of algae or in controlled growth systems, temperature will vary. In a study on the effect of temperature on growth rate and lipid content, temperature showed no significant relation with Nannochloropsis sp. growth rate between 15 °C and 30 °C. However, another algal species in the same study, Isochrysis galbana, showed increased growth rate as the temperature increased from 15 °C to 30 °C. In many algal species, increased lipid content is also observed under increased temperature.

== Culture technologies ==
Different culture technologies are being tested with Nannochloropsis to determine most cost-effective culture methods.

=== Helical-tubular photobioreactor ===
Tubular systems are the most widely used commercial culture systems. They are usually made of polypropylene acrylic or polyvinylchloride pipes which have small internal diameters and an air pump that generates bubbles to mix and agitate the culture. They usually use artificial light but some models use natural light. The major disadvantages of this type of system, varying among individual systems, are high space requirements, cleaning, low efficiency, low gas transfer, and hydrodynamic stress. Several other problems also occur, including growth of the algae on the tube wall leading to blockage of light, high oxygen concentration inhibition of growth, and limits on the length of the tube in single run. Coiled systems were developed mainly to improve space utilization. The main advantages are: 1) large ratio of culture volume to surface area and optimized light penetration depth; 2) easy control over temperature and contaminants; 3) easy spatial distribution of fresh air and CO_{2}; 4) better CO_{2} transfer through the culture; and 5) automated sensor providing cell concentration reads.

=== Open pond and flat-plate photobioreactor ===
Raceway ponds are shallow ponds between 10 and 50 cm deep. They are less expensive to build compared to photobioreactors, and have low-energy-consuming paddlewheels to mix the circulate the culture. The culture is open to the atmosphere, thus allowing liquid evaporation to stabilize the temperature. They are widely used to culture several algae and cyanobacteria. However, only limited types of microalgae can be grown in open ponds. Other disadvantages include large area required, low efficiency of light utilization, poor gas/liquid transfer, no temperature control, high risk of contamination, and low final density of culture.

Flat-plates are a closed system such as helical-tubular photobioreactor. They have a flat surface screen made of glass or optical light film for the even reception of light. A study compared the cultures of Nannochloropsis sp. in open ponds and photobioreactors, tubular and flat-plate. Horizontal tubular photobioreactor was not shown to be economically viable. Both open pond and flat-plate photoreactors were proven to be feasible, given that the lipid content of biomass could be increased to 60%. However, neither system is competitive due to the low cost of petroleum.

=== Fed-batch culture ===
Some algae can grow faster under mixotrophic conditions rather than under photoautotrophic conditions. Under mixotrophic conditions, both light and a carbon substrate such as sugars can provide energy for cell growth. Although adding glucose increased the growth rate of the algal culture, it also adds extra cost to algal lipid production. This needs to be further studied to determine economical feasibility.

=== Flue gas method ===
A unique bio-technology-based environmental system can utilize flue gas from coal burning power plants. This method is reported to decrease the cost of algae production significantly. It also absorbs excessive CO_{2}, thus alleviating greenhouse effect.

== Conversion to biodiesel or biofuel ==
Several different technologies were reported to convert algal culture into biofuel or biodiesel.

=== Direct transesterification ===
A direct transesterification of Nannochloropsis biomass to biodiesel production can be achieved using either microwave or ultrasound radiation. The microwave method was shown to be the simplest and most efficient method for one-stage direct transesterification.

=== Direct pyrolysis and catalytic pyrolysis ===
In a recent study, Nannochloropsis sp. cells was pyrolyzed. The results showed that bio-oils obtained from catalytic pyrolysis had lower oxygen content and higher heating value than those from direct pyrolysis. The catalytic pyrolysis product mainly contained aromatic hydrocarbons. These properties make Nannochloropsis residue a very promising candidate for algal fuel production.

== See also ==
- Algae fuels
- Choricystis
