= Chlorobotrys =

Scientific classification
- Domain: Eukaryota
- Clade: Diaphoretickes
- Clade: SAR
- Clade: Stramenopiles
- Phylum: Gyrista
- Subphylum: Ochrophytina
- Class: Eustigmatophyceae
- Order: Eustigmatales
- Family: Chlorobotryaceae
- Genus: Chlorobotrys; Bohlin, 1901

Genus of algae

Chlorobotrys is a genus of algae belonging to the family Chlorobotryaceae.

The species of this genus are found in Europe.

Species:

- Chlorobotrys regularis (W.West) Bohlin, 1901
