= Sterol O-acyltransferase =

Class of enzymes

sterol O-acyltransferase

Identifiers
- EC no.: 2.3.1.26
- CAS no.: 9027-63-8

Databases
- IntEnz: IntEnz view
- BRENDA: BRENDA entry
- ExPASy: NiceZyme view
- KEGG: KEGG entry
- MetaCyc: metabolic pathway
- PRIAM: profile
- PDB structures: RCSB PDB PDBe PDBsum
- Gene Ontology: AmiGO / QuickGO
Search
- PMC: articles
- PubMed: articles
- NCBI: proteins

sterol O-acyltransferase 1

Identifiers
- Symbol: SOAT1
- Alt. symbols: ACAT, SOAT, STAT
- NCBI gene: 6646
- HGNC: 11177
- OMIM: 102642
- RefSeq: NM_003101
- UniProt: P35610

Other data
- EC number: 2.3.1.26
- Locus: Chr. 1 q25
Search for
- Structures: Swiss-model
- Domains: InterPro

sterol O-acyltransferase 2

Identifiers
- Symbol: SOAT2
- Alt. symbols: ACAT2
- NCBI gene: 8435
- HGNC: 11178
- OMIM: 601311
- RefSeq: NM_003578
- UniProt: O75908

Other data
- EC number: 2.3.1.26
- Locus: Chr. 12
Search for
- Structures: Swiss-model
- Domains: InterPro

Sterol O-acyltransferase (also called Acyl-CoA cholesterol acyltransferase, Acyl-CoA cholesterin acyltransferase or simply ACAT) is an intracellular protein located in the endoplasmic reticulum that forms cholesteryl esters from cholesterol.

Sterol O-acyltransferase catalyzes the chemical reaction:

acyl-CoA + cholesterol $\rightleftharpoons$ CoA + cholesterol ester

Thus, the two substrates of this enzyme are acyl-CoA and cholesterol, whereas its two products are CoA and cholesteryl ester.

This enzyme belongs to the family of transferases, specifically those acyltransferases transferring groups other than aminoacyl groups, the membrane-bound O-acyltransferases. This enzyme participates in bile acid biosynthesis.

== Class and structure ==
Acyl-CoA cholesterol acyl transferase EC 2.3.1.26, more simply referred to as ACAT, also known as sterol O-acyltransferase (SOAT), belongs to the class of enzymes known as acyltransferases. The role of this enzyme is to transfer fatty acyl groups from one molecule to another. ACAT is an important enzyme in bile acid biosynthesis.

In nearly all mammalian cells, ACAT catalyzes the intracellular esterification of cholesterol and formation of cholesteryl esters. The esterification of cholesterol mediated by ACAT is functionally significant for several reasons. ACAT-mediated esterification of cholesterol limits its solubility in the cell membrane lipids and thus promotes accumulation of cholesterol ester in the fat droplets within cytoplasm; this process is important because the toxic accumulation of free cholesterol in various cell membrane fractions is prevented. Most of the cholesterol absorbed during intestinal transport undergoes ACAT-mediated esterification before incorporation in chylomicrons. In the liver, ACAT-mediated esterification of cholesterol is involved in the production and release of apoB-containing lipoproteins. ACAT also plays an important role in foam cell formation and atherosclerosis by participating in accumulating cholesterol esters in macrophages and vascular tissue. The rate-controlling enzyme in cholesterol catabolism, hepatic cholesterol 7-hydroxylase, is believed to be regulated partly by ACAT.

== Mechanism ==
The mechanism scheme is as follows:
Acyl-CoA + Cholesterol ←→ CoA + Cholesteryl ester

== Isoforms ==
There are two isoforms of SOAT (also sometimes referred to as ACAT) that have been reported to date: SOAT1 and SOAT2. SOAT1 is characterized by its ubiquitous presence in tissues with the exception of the intestine, where SOAT2 is prevalent. The different isoforms are also associated with different pathologies associated with abnormalities in lipid metabolism.

=== SOAT1 (ACAT1) ===
Previous studies have shown that SOAT modulates proteolytic processing in cell-based and animal models of Alzheimer's disease. A follow-up study reports that SOAT1 RNAi reduced cellular SOAT1 protein and cholesteryl ester levels while causing a slight increase in free cholesterol content of endoplasmic reticulum membranes. The data also showed that a modest decrease in SOAT activity led to suppressive effects on Abeta generation.

=== SOAT2 (ACAT2) ===
In a recent study, it was shown that SOAT2 activity is upregulated as a result of chronic renal failure. This study was specific to hepatic SOAT, which plays a major role in hepatic production and release of very low density lipoprotein (VLDL), release of cholesterol, foam cell formation, and atherogenesis. In another study, non-human primates revealed a positive correlation between liver cholesteryl ester secretion rate and the development of coronal artery atherosclerosis. The results of the experiment are indicative that under all of the conditions of cellular cholesterol availability tested, the relative level of SOAT2 expression affects the cholesteryl ester content, and therefore the atherogenecity of nascent apoB-containing lipoproteins.

== Yeast ==
In yeast, acyl-CoA:sterol acyltransferase (ASAT) is functionally equivalent to ACAT. Although studies in vitro and in yeast suggest that the acyl-CoA binding protein (ACBP) may modulate long-chain fatty acyl-CoA (LCFA-CoA) distribution, the physiological function in mammals is unresolved. Recent research suggests that ACBP expression may play a role in LCFA-CoA metabolism in a physiological context.

In S. cerevisiae, the accumulation of ergosteryl esters accompanies entry into the stationary phase and sporulation. Researchers have identified two genes in yeast, ARE2 and ARE1, that encode the different isozymes of ASAT. In yeast, Are2 is the major catalytic isoform. Mitotic cell growth and spore germination are not compromised when these genes are deleted, but diploids that are homozygous for an ARE2 null mutation exhibit a decrease in sporulation efficiency.

== Plant Synthesis of Steryl Esters ==
In plants cellular sterol ester synthesis is performed by an enzyme different from mammalian ACAT and yeast ASAT; it is performed by Phospholipid:Sterol Acyltransferase (PSAT). A recent study shows that PSAT is involved in the regulation of the pool of free sterols and the amount of free sterol intermediates in the membranes. It is also described as the only intracellular enzyme discovered that catalyzes an acyl-CoA independent sterol ester formation. PSAT is therefore considered to have a similar physiological function in plant cells as ACAT in animal cells.

== See also ==
- ACAT1 mRNA
- Lecithin—cholesterol acyltransferase (LCAT)
