= Ghrelin O-acyltransferase =

Protein-coding gene in the species Homo sapiens

MBOAT4

Identifiers
- Aliases: MBOAT4, GOAT, OACT4, FKSG89, membrane bound O-acyltransferase domain containing 4
- External IDs: OMIM: 611940; MGI: 2685017; GeneCards: MBOAT4

Gene location (Human)
Chr.	Chromosome 8 (human)
Band	8p12	Start	30,131,671 bp
Band	8p12	End	30,144,665 bp

Gene location (Mouse)
Chr.	Chromosome 8 (mouse)
Band	8|8 A4	Start	34,582,184 bp
Band	8|8 A4	End	34,592,336 bp
RNA expression pattern
Bgee	Human / Mouse (ortholog); Top expressed in: islet of Langerhans; testicle; granulocyte; gallbladder; blood; right adrenal cortex; right uterine tube; body of pancreas; left adrenal gland; lymph node / Top expressed in: morula; otic vesicle; embryo; facial motor nucleus; piriform cortex; subiculum; medial geniculate nucleus; lateral septal nucleus; hair follicle; Paneth cell; More reference expression data
BioGPS	n/a
Gene ontology
Molecular function	transferase activity; serine O-acyltransferase activity; acyltransferase activity; O-acyltransferase activity
Cellular component	integral component of membrane; integral component of endoplasmic reticulum membrane; endoplasmic reticulum membrane; endoplasmic reticulum; membrane
Biological process	peptidyl-serine octanoylation
Sources:Amigo / QuickGO
Orthologs
Databases	NCBI: entry; OMA: entry
Species	Human	Mouse
Entrez	619373	234155
Ensembl	ENSG00000177669	ENSMUSG00000071113
UniProt	Q96T53	P0C7A3
RefSeq (mRNA)	NM_001100916	NM_001126314
RefSeq (protein)	NP_001094386	NP_001119786
Location (UCSC)	Chr 8: 30.13 – 30.14 Mb	Chr 8: 34.58 – 34.59 Mb
PubMed search
- Wikidata
View/Edit Human	View/Edit Mouse

Ghrelin O-acyltransferase also known as membrane bound O-acyltransferase domain containing 4 is an enzyme that in humans is encoded by the MBOAT4 gene. It is homologous to other membrane-bound O-acyltransferases. It is a polytopic membrane protein what takes part in lipid signaling reactions. It is the only known enzyme that catalyzes the acylation of ghrelin through the transfer of n-octanoic acid to ghrelin Ser3. Ghrelin O-acyltransferase function is essential in regulation of appetite and the release of growth hormone. Ghrelin O-acyltransferase is a target for scientific research due to promising applications in the treatment of diabetes, eating disorders, and metabolic diseases.

Consistent with its function relative to ghrelin, ghrelin O-acyltransferase can be found in all vertebrates, including mammals, birds, and fish species, apart from some reptiles. The enzyme is primarily expressed in the stomach and the gastrointestinal system. Other sites where ghrelin O-acyltransferase can be found include tissue from the brain, the pancreas, the pituitary gland, and certain forms of cancer.

== Structure ==
The structure of ghrelin O-acyltransferase has not been fully elucidated or tested experimentally. Using biochemical mapping tools, researchers showed that the ghrelin O-acyltransferase enzyme consists of eleven transmembrane helical domains and one reentrant loop. The C-terminus of ghrelin O-acyltransferase is located on the cytosolic side of the endoplasmic reticulum (ER) while the N-terminus resides in the lumen of the membrane. The topology models of ghrelin O-acyltransferase are similar to those of acetyl-coenzyme A acetyltransferase 1 and glycerol uptake protein 1. This is consistent with ghrelin O-acyltransferase being a member of the membrane bound O-acyl transferase family.

Ghrelin O-acyltransferase contains conserved asparagine (Asn307) and histidine (His338) residues that are found across the membrane bound O-acyl transferase family. These amino acids are positioned on opposite side of the endoplasmic reticulum membrane. His338 resides in the lumen and is necessary for the observed catalytic activity of the enzyme.

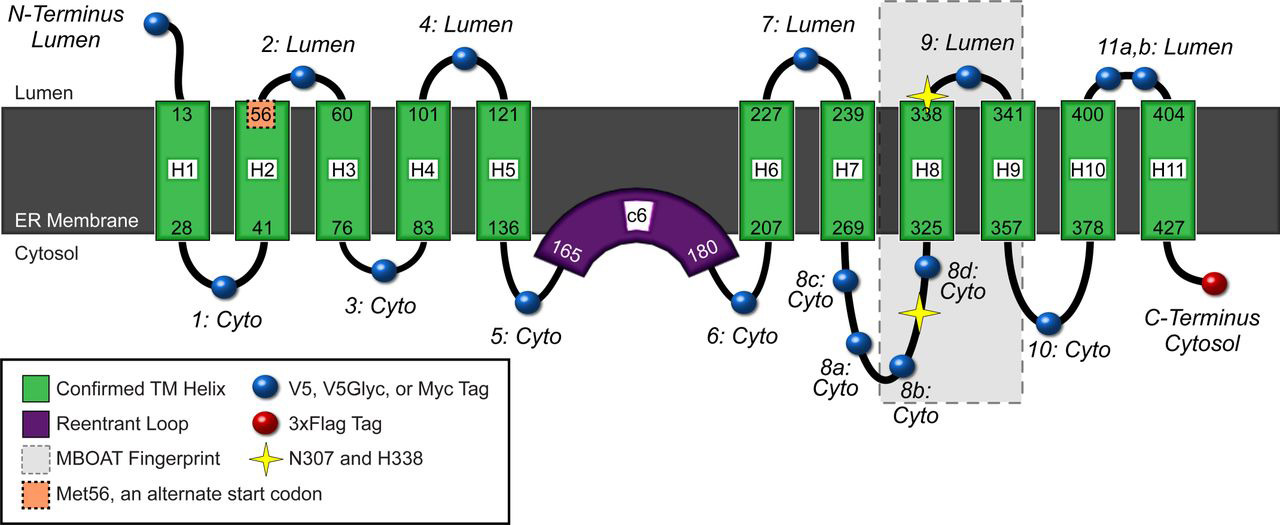
Topology model of ghrelin O-acyltransferase spanning the ER membrane with the cytosolic part depicted below.

== History ==
The first reported discovery of ghrelin O-acyl transferase was in February 2008 by two separate research groups at Eli Lilly and the University of Texas at Austin (UT). The UT group identified orphan acyltransferase enzymes through the genome database and expressed both the enzymes in ghrelin in cells.^{[7]} They found that membrane-bound O-acyltransferase domain 4 specifically acylated ghrelin. The Eli Lilly team confirmed that enzyme is necessary to modify the ghrelin peptide by performing GOAT knock down experiments to prevent expression on the gene. Currently, the major pharmaceutical companies with patents related to ghrelin O-acyl transferase are Eli Lilly, Takeda Pharmaceutical Company, and Boehringer Ingelheim.

=== Pharmaceutical development ===
One medical use of ghrelin O-acyl transferase inhibitors has been in the preclinical treatment of Prader–Willi syndrome, a rare genetic disorder resulting in early-onset diabetes. In 2018, Rhythm Pharmaceuticals announced a licensing agreement with Takeda Pharmaceutical to develop an orally administered ghrelin O-acyl transferase inhibitor in order to decrease the amount of active ghrelin in individuals suffering from Prader-Willi Syndrome. Preclinical research has shown that this drug prevented weight gain with positive pharmacological and safety profiles.

Additionally, ghrelin O-acyl transferase inhibition has been used in clinical trials in the United Kingdom in studying appetite regulation of post-surgical bariatric patients. The study measured, among other things, the effect of decreased ghrelin levels on gut hormone, adipokine, and cytokine levels.

== Chemical properties ==
Structure-activity studies have demonstrated that the ‘GSSF’ N-terminal sequence of ghrelin is essential to ghrelin O-acyl transferase substrate recognition. While the enzyme will accept sequences with a threonine reside in place of serine, catalytic activity is reduced in these cases. Ghrelin O-acyl transferase is also poorly stereospecific and is able to recognize and acylate both stereoisomers of serine. The enzymatic activity of GOAT is also altered when treated with cysteine-modifying substances. Interestingly, the enzyme is relatively insensitive to pH changes in the range of 6–9. Kinetic studies also suggest that GOAT activity is consistent with Michaelis-Menten kinetics in the acylation of ghrelin. One paper proposes that bioavailability of the GOAT substrates represent the rate-limiting step of the acyl transfer reaction and not the chemical process itself.

=== Biochemical assays ===
Several biochemical assays have been developed to study the activity of the enzyme under in vitro conditions. The most common is the use of an amino acid and radioactive isotope tags to monitor the formation of reaction products. Also widespread is the use of indirect methods to observe ghrelin O-acyl transferase function such as the detection of acylated ghrelin products, which indicate enzyme activity. These assays are based on high-throughput ELISA based techniques. There has also been published literature describing protocols for ghrelin O-acyl transferase function expression and enrichment in insect cells, the use of high performance liquid chromatography assays for acylation activity, and the use of fluorescent protein labels.

== Metabolic function ==
In humans, the ghrelin O-acyl transferase function enzyme post-translationally modifies an inactive form of ghrelin, known as proghrelin, on an N-terminus serine residue. This function is essential in forming an active form of ghrelin, which can then be secreted into the bloodstream. Ghrelin O-acyltransferase also plays a role in preventing hypoglycemia when there is prolonged negative energy balance in the body. GOAT plays a crucial role in the ability to maintain glucose levels during fasting and starvation. Additionally, the enzyme has a key role in modulating the secretion and sensitivity of insulin. These interactions are used in regulating glucose metabolism in the body.

Functional genes for MBOAT4 are not present in some groups of animals. Among reptiles, snakes, chameleons and toadhead agamas have either lost the gene or it has become so mutated that it can no longer give rise to the protein. These animals can go for long periods without eating and commonly have their meals spaced weeks, months or even years apart. It appears that this gene loss has happened independently in several evolutionary separated groups of animals. They also lack ghrelin. Lack of ghrelin and MBOAT4 may be relevant to the way that these reptiles can live at a low energy demand for months or years. Their fat stores are used at a low level. The presence of many mutations in genes for aspects of mitochondrial function in these animals may also be involved in their reduced energy demand.

=== Regulation ===
Ghrelin O-acyltransferase is highly regulated by energy balance and is upregulated when energy is restricted, such as when fasting. Additionally ghrelin O-acyl transferase function is activated by high bioavailability of lipids and fatty foods. The expression of this enzyme is also regulated by several different growth and appetite related hormones. For example, research has shown that the hormone leptin increases ghrelin O-acyl transferase mRNA levels, and therefore enzyme expression.

=== Inhibition ===
Ghrelin O-acyl transferase inhibitors often result in increased insulin secretion, potentially preventing diabetes and obesity. However, the lack of mechanistic information about the active site of the enzyme prevents rational design of inhibitor molecules. Nonetheless, there have been two general classes of ghrelin O-acyl transferase inhibitors which have been described in scientific literature: substrate mimics and small molecules.

In terms of substrate-memetic inhibitors, it has been determined that ghrelin O-acyl transferase is subject to end product inhibition, also known as feedback inhibition. As such, changing the ester linkage between the n-octanoyl group and ghrelin into an amide group decreases the potency of the enzyme. Replacing the acyl chain entirely with a more biologically stable product inhibits the enzyme through competitive binding with the active site of the enzyme. Many similar substrate mimics use chemical modification on the ghrelin molecule to prevent ghrelin O-acyl transferase from carrying out the acylation reaction that activates ghrelin. Other approaches in the category include altering functional group or amino acid stereochemistry to greatly decrease enzyme binding affinity between ghrelin O-acyl transferase and ghrelin.

There have also been recent advances in small molecule, drug-like inhibition of the ghrelin O-acyl transferase enzyme. One study has shown that a class of triterpenoid related molecules has significant inhibitory activity towards the enzyme. These analyses suggest that there is an essential cystine residue in the active site of ghrelin O-acyl transferase that has a role in the enzyme's catalytic function or inhibitor site binding. This class of inhibitors have been shown to alter ghrelin signaling and reportedly result in weight loss and increased glucose tolerance.

== See also ==
- Ghrelin
- Acyltransferase
- MBOAT
