= MBOAT7 =

Protein-coding gene in the species Homo sapiens

Identifiers
- Aliases: MBOAT7, BB1, LENG4, LPIAT, LRC4, MBOA7, OACT7, hMBOA-7, membrane bound O-acyltransferase domain containing 7, MRT57, LPLAT
- External IDs: OMIM: 606048; MGI: 1924832; GeneCards: MBOAT7

Gene location (Human)
Chr.	Chromosome 19 (human)
Band	19q13.42	Start	54,173,412 bp
Band	19q13.42	End	54,189,882 bp

Gene location (Mouse)
Chr.	Chromosome 7 (mouse)
Band	7|7 A1	Start	3,680,788 bp
Band	7|7 A1	End	3,696,522 bp
RNA expression pattern
Bgee	Human / Mouse (ortholog); Top expressed in: blood; right adrenal gland; right adrenal cortex; left adrenal gland; left adrenal cortex; superior frontal gyrus; stromal cell of endometrium; right frontal lobe; prefrontal cortex; hypothalamus / Top expressed in: granulocyte; ventromedial nucleus; dorsomedial hypothalamic nucleus; central gray substance of midbrain; superior frontal gyrus; primary visual cortex; nucleus of stria terminalis; paraventricular nucleus of hypothalamus; lateral hypothalamus; arcuate nucleus; More reference expression data
BioGPS	n/a
Gene ontology
Molecular function	transferase activity; acyltransferase activity; protein binding; 2-acylglycerol-3-phosphate O-acyltransferase activity; 1-acylglycerol-3-phosphate O-acyltransferase activity; lysophospholipid acyltransferase activity
Cellular component	integral component of membrane; endoplasmic reticulum membrane; membrane; mitochondria associated membranes; endoplasmic reticulum
Biological process	phosphatidylinositol acyl-chain remodeling; phosphatidylinositol metabolic process; ventricular system development; lipid metabolism; phospholipid biosynthetic process; phospholipid metabolic process; layer formation in cerebral cortex
Sources:Amigo / QuickGO
Orthologs
Databases	NCBI: entry; OMA: entry
Species	Human	Mouse
Entrez	79143	77582
Ensembl	ENSG00000273592; ENSG00000278519; ENSG00000274194; ENSG00000125505; ENSG00000277025 ENSG00000275118; ENSG00000276935; ENSG00000277733; ENSG00000277923; ENSG00000278322	ENSMUSG00000035596
UniProt	Q96N66	Q8CHK3
RefSeq (mRNA)	NM_001146056; NM_001146082; NM_001146083; NM_024298	NM_029934
RefSeq (protein)	NP_001139528; NP_001139554; NP_001139555; NP_077274	NP_084210
Location (UCSC)	Chr 19: 54.17 – 54.19 Mb	Chr 7: 3.68 – 3.7 Mb
PubMed search
- Wikidata
View/Edit Human	View/Edit Mouse

Lysophospholipid acyltransferase 7 also known as membrane-bound O-acyltransferase domain-containing protein 7 (MBOAT7) is an enzyme that in humans is encoded by the MBOAT7 gene. It is homologous to other membrane-bound O-acyltransferases.

== Function ==
This gene encodes a member of the membrane-bound O-acyltransferase family of integral membrane proteins that have acyltransferase activity. The encoded protein is a lysophosphatidylinositol acyltransferase that has specificity for arachidonoyl-CoA as an acyl donor. This protein is involved in the re-acylation of phospholipids as part of the phospholipid remodeling pathway known as the Land cycle.
