= MBOAT2 =

Protein-coding gene in the species Homo sapiens

Identifiers
- Aliases: MBOAT2, LPCAT4, OACT2, LPAAT, LPEAT, LPLAT 2, membrane bound O-acyltransferase domain containing 2, LPCAT
- External IDs: OMIM: 611949; MGI: 1914466; GeneCards: MBOAT2
Enzyme activity
EC #	BRENDA	ExPASy	KEGG	MetaCyc
2.3.1.23	↗	↗	↗	↗
2.3.1.51	↗	↗	↗	↗

Gene location (Human)
Chr.	Chromosome 2 (human)
Band	2p25.1	Start	8,852,690 bp
Band	2p25.1	End	9,003,709 bp

Gene location (Mouse)
Chr.	Chromosome 12 (mouse)
Band	12|12 A1.3	Start	24,880,878 bp
Band	12|12 A1.3	End	25,014,396 bp
RNA expression pattern
Bgee	Human / Mouse (ortholog); Top expressed in: corpus callosum; mucosa of esophagus; gums; gingival epithelium; oral cavity; ganglionic eminence; tibial nerve; skin of leg; trabecular bone; C1 segment / Top expressed in: umbilical cord; human fetus; otic placode; sciatic nerve; condyle; epithelium of stomach; epithelium of lens; saccule; otic vesicle; Rostral migratory stream; More reference expression data
BioGPS	n/a
Gene ontology
Molecular function	transferase activity; acyltransferase activity; 1-acylglycerol-3-phosphate O-acyltransferase activity; 2-acylglycerol-3-phosphate O-acyltransferase activity
Cellular component	integral component of membrane; endoplasmic reticulum membrane; membrane
Biological process	phosphatidylethanolamine acyl-chain remodeling; phosphatidylcholine acyl-chain remodeling; lipid metabolism; phospholipid biosynthetic process; phospholipid metabolic process
Sources:Amigo / QuickGO
Orthologs
Databases	NCBI: entry; OMA: entry
Species	Human	Mouse
Entrez	129642	67216
Ensembl	ENSG00000143797	ENSMUSG00000020646
UniProt	Q6ZWT7	Q8R3I2
RefSeq (mRNA)	NM_138799; NM_001321265; NM_001321266; NM_001321267	NM_001083341; NM_026037
RefSeq (protein)	NP_001308194; NP_001308195; NP_001308196; NP_620154	NP_001076810; NP_080313
Location (UCSC)	Chr 2: 8.85 – 9 Mb	Chr 12: 24.88 – 25.01 Mb
PubMed search
- Wikidata
View/Edit Human	View/Edit Mouse

Membrane bound O-acyltransferase domain containing 2 is a protein that in humans is encoded by the MBOAT2 gene.
