= MBOAT1 =

Protein-coding gene in humans

Identifiers
- Aliases: MBOAT1, LPEAT1, LPLAT, LPLAT 1, LPSAT, OACT1, dJ434O11.1, membrane bound O-acyltransferase domain containing 1
- External IDs: OMIM: 611732; MGI: 2387184; GeneCards: MBOAT1
Enzyme activity
EC #	BRENDA	ExPASy	KEGG	MetaCyc
2.3.1.23	↗	↗	↗	↗

Gene location (Human)
Chr.	Chromosome 6 (human)
Band	6p22.3	Start	20,099,684 bp
Band	6p22.3	End	20,212,469 bp

Gene location (Mouse)
Chr.	Chromosome 13 (mouse)
Band	13|13 A3.2	Start	30,320,472 bp
Band	13|13 A3.2	End	30,430,700 bp
RNA expression pattern
Bgee	Human / Mouse (ortholog); Top expressed in: mucosa of ileum; right uterine tube; mucosa of transverse colon; tendon of biceps brachii; mucosa of sigmoid colon; nasal epithelium; bronchial epithelial cell; epithelium of nasopharynx; rectum; tibia / Top expressed in: left colon; lens; epithelium of stomach; pyloric antrum; mucous cell of stomach; sciatic nerve; epithelium of lens; inner renal medulla; yolk sac; conjunctival fornix; More reference expression data
BioGPS	n/a
Gene ontology
Molecular function	transferase activity; acyltransferase activity; 2-acylglycerol-3-phosphate O-acyltransferase activity; 1-acylglycerol-3-phosphate O-acyltransferase activity
Cellular component	integral component of membrane; endoplasmic reticulum membrane; membrane
Biological process	phosphatidylserine acyl-chain remodeling; phosphatidylethanolamine acyl-chain remodeling; lipid metabolism; phospholipid biosynthetic process; phospholipid metabolic process
Sources:Amigo / QuickGO
Orthologs
Databases	NCBI: entry; OMA: entry
Species	Human	Mouse
Entrez	154141	218121
Ensembl	ENSG00000172197	ENSMUSG00000038732
UniProt	Q6ZNC8	Q8BH98
RefSeq (mRNA)	NM_001080480	NM_153546
RefSeq (protein)	NP_001073949	NP_705774
Location (UCSC)	Chr 6: 20.1 – 20.21 Mb	Chr 13: 30.32 – 30.43 Mb
PubMed search
- Wikidata
View/Edit Human	View/Edit Mouse

MBOAT1 or membrane bound glycerophospholipid O-acyltransferase 1 is a protein that in humans is encoded by the MBOAT1 gene. MBOAT1 is a membrane-bound glycerophospholipid O-acyltransferase that participates in lipid remodeling processes.
