= DGAT1 =

Mammalian protein found in Homo sapiens

Identifiers
- Aliases: DGAT1, ARAT, ARGP1, DGAT, DIAR7, diacylglycerol O-acyltransferase 1
- External IDs: OMIM: 604900; MGI: 1333825; GeneCards: DGAT1
Enzyme activity
EC #	BRENDA	ExPASy	KEGG	MetaCyc
2.3.1.20	↗	↗	↗	↗
2.3.1.76	↗	↗	↗	↗

Gene location (Human)
Chr.	Chromosome 8 (human)
Band	8q24.3	Start	144,314,584 bp
Band	8q24.3	End	144,326,910 bp

Gene location (Mouse)
Chr.	Chromosome 15 (mouse)
Band	15 D3|15 35.99 cM	Start	76,386,215 bp
Band	15 D3|15 35.99 cM	End	76,396,153 bp
RNA expression pattern
Bgee	Human / Mouse (ortholog); Top expressed in: duodenum; mucosa of transverse colon; right adrenal cortex; left adrenal cortex; left testis; right testis; apex of heart; right lobe of liver; subcutaneous adipose tissue; blood / Top expressed in: granulocyte; duodenum; crypt of lieberkuhn of small intestine; jejunum; brown adipose tissue; ileum; intestinal villus; epithelium of small intestine; tunica adventitia of aorta; spermatocyte; More reference expression data
BioGPS	n/a
Gene ontology
Molecular function	transferase activity; O-acyltransferase activity; protein binding; 2-acylglycerol O-acyltransferase activity; retinol O-fatty-acyltransferase activity; acyltransferase activity; diacylglycerol O-acyltransferase activity
Cellular component	integral component of membrane; endoplasmic reticulum membrane; membrane; intracellular membrane-bounded organelle; endoplasmic reticulum; plasma membrane; specific granule membrane
Biological process	glycerolipid metabolic process; retinol metabolic process; lipid storage; fatty acid homeostasis; diacylglycerol metabolic process; triglyceride biosynthetic process; very-low-density lipoprotein particle assembly; long-chain fatty-acyl-CoA metabolic process; triglyceride metabolic process; acylglycerol acyl-chain remodeling; neutrophil degranulation
Sources:Amigo / QuickGO
Orthologs
Databases	NCBI: entry; OMA: entry
Species	Human	Mouse
Entrez	8694	13350
Ensembl	ENSG00000185000; ENSG00000285482	ENSMUSG00000022555
UniProt	O75907	Q9Z2A7
RefSeq (mRNA)	NM_012079	NM_010046
RefSeq (protein)	NP_036211	NP_034176
Location (UCSC)	Chr 8: 144.31 – 144.33 Mb	Chr 15: 76.39 – 76.4 Mb
PubMed search
- Wikidata
View/Edit Human	View/Edit Mouse

Diacylglycerol O-acyltransferase 1 is an enzyme that in humans is encoded by the DGAT1 gene.

== Function ==
This gene encodes a multipass transmembrane protein that functions as a key metabolic enzyme. The encoded protein catalyzes the conversion of diacylglycerol and fatty acyl CoA to triacylglycerol. This enzyme can also transfer acyl CoA to retinol. Activity of this protein may be associated with obesity and other metabolic diseases. This enzyme is essential for lactation in mice, and mutations in this gene affect the composition and volume of milk produced by both cattle and goats. Without this gene activity, infants who have a mutation in this gene are incapable of breaking down fat. This lack of capability to break down fat causes diarrhea and vomiting which eventually causes FTT (Failure to Thrive) and need of TPN (Total Parenteral Nutrition) if not given correct formula. Further this will cause protein losing enteropathy and very low albumin.

== See also ==
- Diglyceride acyltransferase
