= HHIP =

Protein-coding gene in the species Homo sapiens

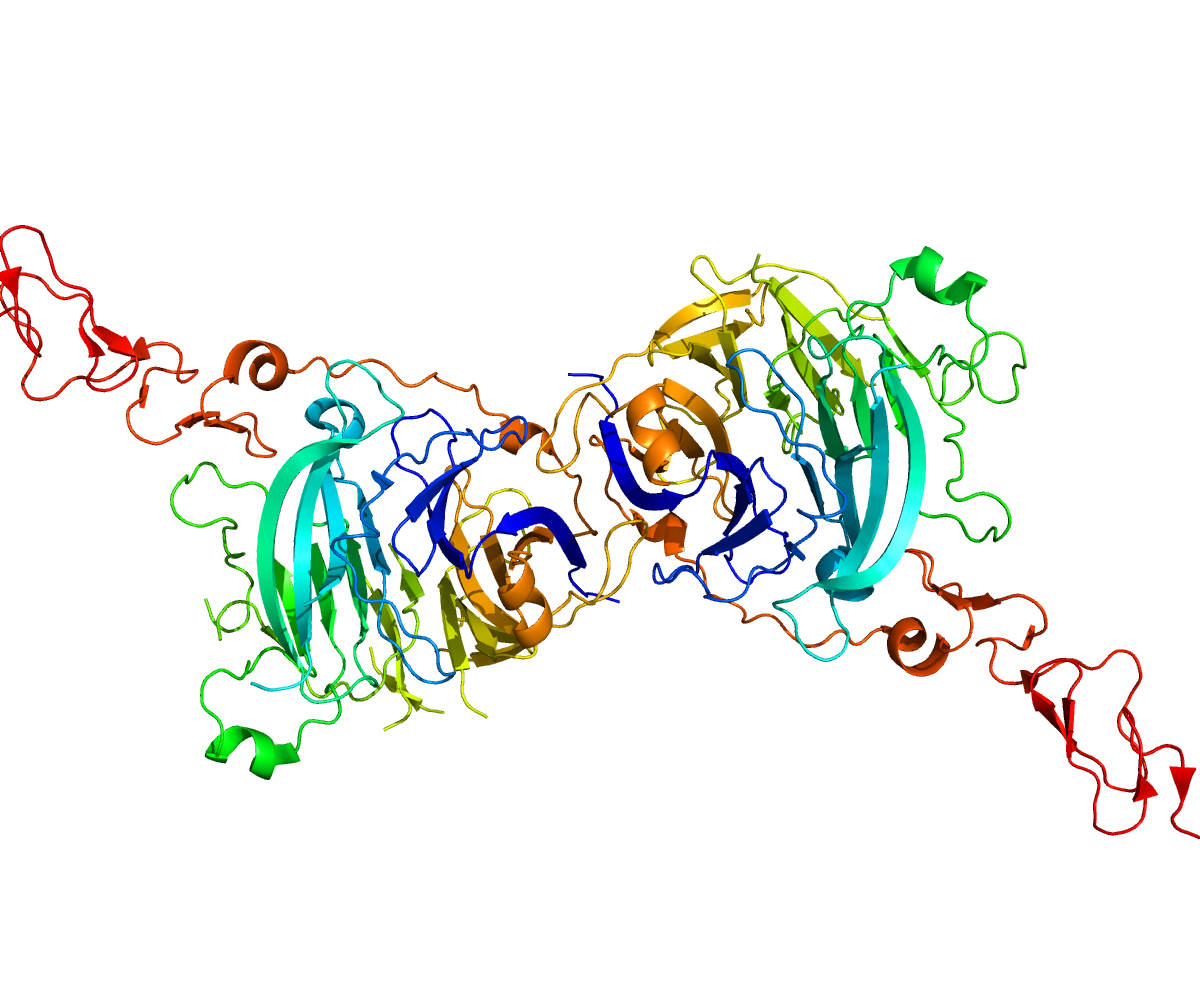
Available structures
PDB	Ortholog search: PDBe RCSB
PDB	List of PDB id codes 2WFT, 2WFX, 2WG3, 2WG4, 3HO3, 3HO4, 3HO5

Identifiers
- Aliases: HHIP, HIP, hedgehog interacting protein
- External IDs: OMIM: 606178; MGI: 1341847; HomoloGene: 32469; GeneCards: HHIP; OMA:HHIP - orthologs

Gene location (Human)
Chr.	Chromosome 4 (human)
Band	4q31.21	Start	144,646,156 bp
Band	4q31.21	End	144,745,271 bp

Gene location (Mouse)
Chr.	Chromosome 8 (mouse)
Band	8 C2|8 37.95 cM	Start	80,692,480 bp
Band	8 C2|8 37.95 cM	End	80,784,635 bp
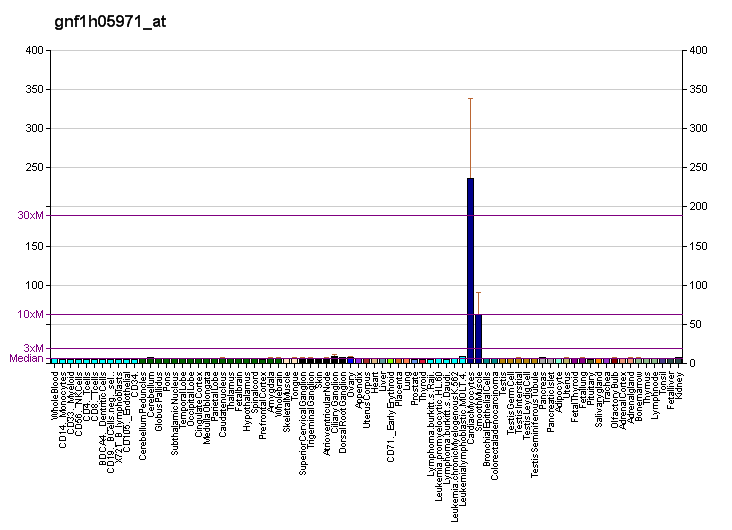

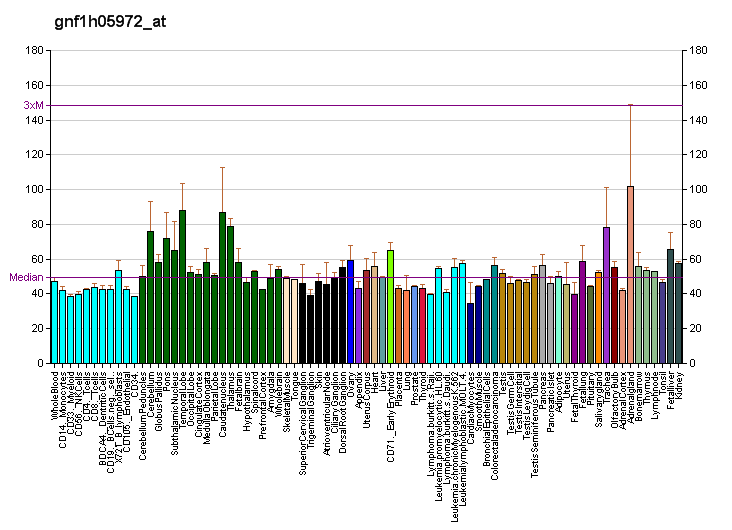
RNA expression pattern
Bgee	Human / Mouse (ortholog); Top expressed in: corpus callosum; endothelial cell; globus pallidus; inferior ganglion of vagus nerve; internal globus pallidus; external globus pallidus; tibia; subthalamic nucleus; synovial joint; epithelium of colon / Top expressed in: left lung lobe; membranous bone; habenula; Dermatocranium; maxilla; mandible; lumbar subsegment of spinal cord; molar; iris; rib; More reference expression data
BioGPS	More reference expression data
Gene ontology
Molecular function	zinc ion binding; metal ion binding; protein binding; catalytic activity; hedgehog family protein binding
Cellular component	cytoplasm; membrane; plasma membrane; integral component of plasma membrane; extracellular region; cell surface; ciliary membrane; nucleus
Biological process	negative regulation of smoothened signaling pathway; regulation of fibroblast growth factor receptor signaling pathway; skeletal system morphogenesis; animal organ morphogenesis; neuroblast proliferation; smoothened signaling pathway; negative regulation of signal transduction; dorsal/ventral pattern formation; epithelial tube branching involved in lung morphogenesis; signal transduction; negative regulation of apoptotic process
Sources:Amigo / QuickGO
Orthologs
Species	Human	Mouse
Entrez	64399	15245
Ensembl	ENSG00000164161	ENSMUSG00000064325
UniProt	Q96QV1	Q7TN16
RefSeq (mRNA)	NM_022475	NM_020259
RefSeq (protein)	NP_071920	NP_064655
Location (UCSC)	Chr 4: 144.65 – 144.75 Mb	Chr 8: 80.69 – 80.78 Mb
PubMed search
- Wikidata
View/Edit Human	View/Edit Mouse

Hedgehog interacting protein (HHIP) is a protein that in humans is encoded by the HHIP gene.

This gene encodes a protein similar to the mouse hedgehog interacting protein, a regulatory component of the Hedgehog signaling pathway. Members of the hedgehog family are evolutionarily conserved proteins which are involved in many fundamental processes in embryonic development, including anteroposterior patterns of limbs and regulation of left-right asymmetry.
