= SOAT1 =

Protein found in humans

Identifiers
- Aliases: SOAT1, ACACT, ACAT, ACAT-1, ACAT1, SOAT, STAT, sterol O-acyltransferase 1
- External IDs: OMIM: 102642; MGI: 104665; GeneCards: SOAT1
Enzyme activity
EC #	BRENDA	ExPASy	KEGG	MetaCyc
2.3.1.26	↗	↗	↗	↗

Gene location (Human)
Chr.	Chromosome 1 (human)
Band	1q25.2	Start	179,293,714 bp
Band	1q25.2	End	179,358,680 bp

Gene location (Mouse)
Chr.	Chromosome 1 (mouse)
Band	1 G3|1 67.71 cM	Start	156,252,095 bp
Band	1 G3|1 67.71 cM	End	156,301,901 bp
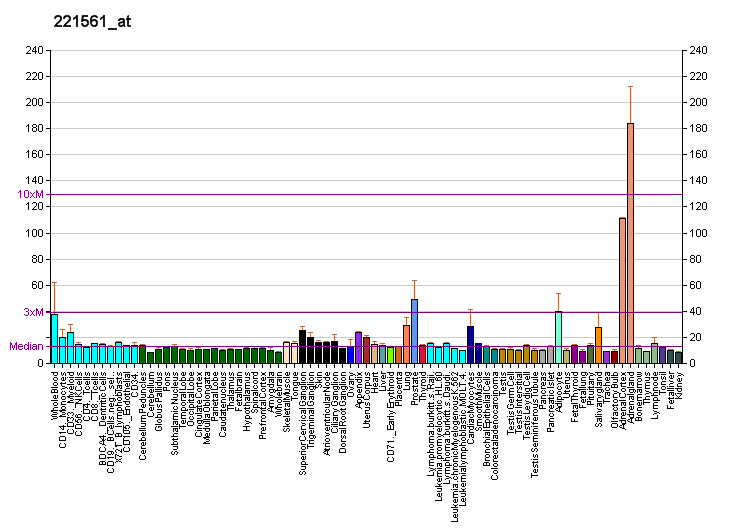
RNA expression pattern
Bgee	Human / Mouse (ortholog); Top expressed in: right adrenal cortex; left adrenal cortex; skin of thigh; parotid gland; bronchial epithelial cell; endothelial cell; visceral pleura; monocyte; islet of Langerhans; ventricular zone / Top expressed in: cumulus cell; lacrimal gland; parotid gland; ovary; medullary collecting duct; stroma of bone marrow; lip; decidua; adrenal gland; yolk sac; More reference expression data
BioGPS	More reference expression data
Gene ontology
Molecular function	transferase activity; fatty-acyl-CoA binding; sterol O-acyltransferase activity; O-acyltransferase activity; cholesterol binding; protein binding; acyltransferase activity; cholesterol O-acyltransferase activity
Cellular component	integral component of membrane; membrane; endoplasmic reticulum; endoplasmic reticulum membrane
Biological process	steroid metabolic process; macrophage derived foam cell differentiation; lipid metabolism; cholesterol metabolic process; cholesterol esterification; cholesterol storage; cholesterol efflux; positive regulation of amyloid precursor protein biosynthetic process; very-low-density lipoprotein particle assembly; cholesterol homeostasis; low-density lipoprotein particle clearance; metabolism
Sources:Amigo / QuickGO
Orthologs
Databases	NCBI: entry; OMA: entry
Species	Human	Mouse
Entrez	6646	20652
Ensembl	ENSG00000057252	ENSMUSG00000026600
UniProt	P35610	Q61263
RefSeq (mRNA)	NM_001252511; NM_001252512; NM_003101	NM_009230
RefSeq (protein)	NP_001239440; NP_001239441; NP_003092	NP_033256
Location (UCSC)	Chr 1: 179.29 – 179.36 Mb	Chr 1: 156.25 – 156.3 Mb
PubMed search
- Wikidata
View/Edit Human	View/Edit Mouse

Sterol O-acyltransferase (acyl-Coenzyme A: cholesterol acyltransferase) 1, also known as SOAT1, is an enzyme that in humans is encoded by the SOAT1 gene.

== Function ==
Acyl-coenzyme A:cholesterol acyltransferase (EC 2.3.1.26) is an intracellular protein located in the endoplasmic reticulum that forms cholesterol esters from cholesterol. Accumulation of cholesterol esters as cytoplasmic lipid droplets within macrophages and smooth muscle cells is a characteristic feature of the early stages of atherosclerotic plaques (Cadigan et al., 1988).

== Structure and biogenesis ==
SOAT1 is a polytopic integral membrane protein belonging to the membrane-bound O-acyltransferase (MBOAT) superfamily. The structure of SOAT1 has not yet been solved but that of DltB, a bacterial MBOAT, suggests a complex arrangement of multiple transmembrane domains (TMDs). Primary sequences of predicted SOAT1 TMDs indicate many unusual TMD features such as the presence of multiple charged residues within the lipid bilayer. These features can render challenging the integration of a TMD into the hydrophobic phase of the membrane and might therefore require specialised chaperones. A first hint of such a chaperone assisting SOAT1 biogenesis has been the recognition of the involvement of the ER membrane protein complex (EMC), a molecular chaperone and insertase for integral membrane proteins, in maintaining SOAT1 stability.

== Interactive pathway map ==
Click on genes, proteins and metabolites below to link to respective articles. (Note: The interactive pathway map can be edited at WikiPathways: "Statin_Pathway_WP430".)

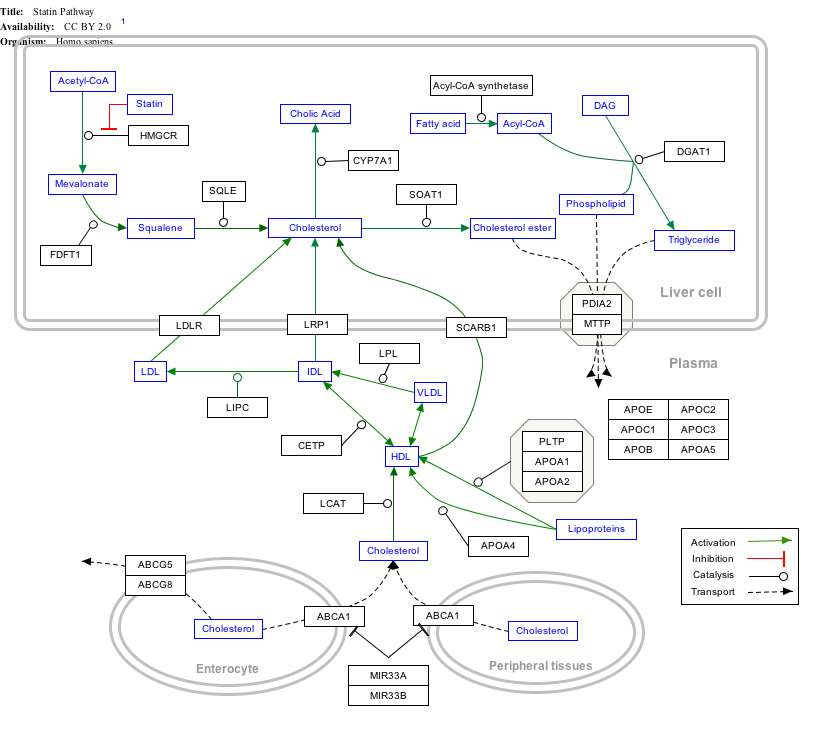

Statin pathway edit

== See also ==
- Acyl-CoA:cholesterol acyltransferase
