= Diacylglycerol O-acyltransferase 2 =

Protein-coding gene in the species Homo sapiens

DGAT2

Identifiers
- Aliases: DGAT2, ARAT, GS1999FULL, HMFN1045, diacylglycerol O-acyltransferase 2
- External IDs: OMIM: 606983; MGI: 1915050; GeneCards: DGAT2
Enzyme activity
EC #	BRENDA	ExPASy	KEGG	MetaCyc
2.3.1.20	↗	↗	↗	↗
2.3.1.76	↗	↗	↗	↗

Gene location (Human)
Chr.	Chromosome 11 (human)
Band	11q13.5	Start	75,759,512 bp
Band	11q13.5	End	75,801,535 bp

Gene location (Mouse)
Chr.	Chromosome 7 (mouse)
Band	7|7 E1	Start	98,802,865 bp
Band	7|7 E1	End	98,831,926 bp
RNA expression pattern
Bgee	Human / Mouse (ortholog); Top expressed in: skin of arm; skin of thigh; right lobe of liver; skin of abdomen; blood; adipose tissue; jejunal mucosa; vulva; subcutaneous adipose tissue; abdominal fat / Top expressed in: epithelium of small intestine; brown adipose tissue; tunica adventitia of aorta; esophagus; trachea; lip; white adipose tissue; mammary gland; extraocular muscle; cardiac muscles; More reference expression data
BioGPS	n/a
Gene ontology
Molecular function	protein homodimerization activity; acyltransferase activity, transferring groups other than amino-acyl groups; acyltransferase activity; 2-acylglycerol O-acyltransferase activity; retinol O-fatty-acyltransferase activity; transferase activity; diacylglycerol O-acyltransferase activity
Cellular component	integral component of membrane; intracellular membrane-bounded organelle; lipid droplet; perinuclear region of cytoplasm; integral component of endoplasmic reticulum membrane; membrane; endoplasmic reticulum; endoplasmic reticulum membrane; mitochondrion
Biological process	regulation of cholesterol metabolic process; lipid storage; long-chain fatty-acyl-CoA metabolic process; positive regulation of gluconeogenesis; fat pad development; cellular response to oleic acid; fatty acid homeostasis; positive regulation of triglyceride biosynthetic process; lipid metabolism; regulation of plasma lipoprotein particle levels; negative regulation of fatty acid oxidation; acylglycerol acyl-chain remodeling; retinol metabolic process; low-density lipoprotein particle clearance; glycerol metabolic process; diacylglycerol metabolic process; cellular triglyceride homeostasis; cholesterol homeostasis; regulation of lipoprotein metabolic process; triglyceride biosynthetic process
Sources:Amigo / QuickGO
Orthologs
Databases	NCBI: entry; OMA: entry
Species	Human	Mouse
Entrez	84649	67800
Ensembl	ENSG00000062282	ENSMUSG00000030747
UniProt	Q96PD7	Q9DCV3
RefSeq (mRNA)	NM_001253891; NM_032564	NM_026384
RefSeq (protein)	NP_001240820; NP_115953	NP_080660
Location (UCSC)	Chr 11: 75.76 – 75.8 Mb	Chr 7: 98.8 – 98.83 Mb
PubMed search
- Wikidata
View/Edit Human	View/Edit Mouse

Diacylglycerol O-acyltransferase 2 (DGAT2) is a protein that in humans is encoded by the DGAT2 gene.

== Function ==
This gene encodes one of two enzymes which catalyzes the final reaction in the synthesis of triglycerides in which diacylglycerol is covalently bound to long chain fatty acyl-CoAs.

The encoded protein catalyzes this reaction at low concentrations of magnesium chloride while the other enzyme has high activity at high concentrations of magnesium chloride. Multiple transcript variants encoding different isoforms have been found for this gene.
