= SOAT2 =

Protein-coding gene in the species Homo sapiens

Identifiers
- Aliases: SOAT2, ACACT2, ACAT2, ARGP2, sterol O-acyltransferase 2
- External IDs: OMIM: 601311; MGI: 1332226; GeneCards: SOAT2
Enzyme activity
EC #	BRENDA	ExPASy	KEGG	MetaCyc
2.3.1.26	↗	↗	↗	↗

Gene location (Human)
Chr.	Chromosome 12 (human)
Band	12q13.13	Start	53,103,486 bp
Band	12q13.13	End	53,124,535 bp

Gene location (Mouse)
Chr.	Chromosome 15 (mouse)
Band	15 F2|15 57.33 cM	Start	102,058,961 bp
Band	15 F2|15 57.33 cM	End	102,071,904 bp
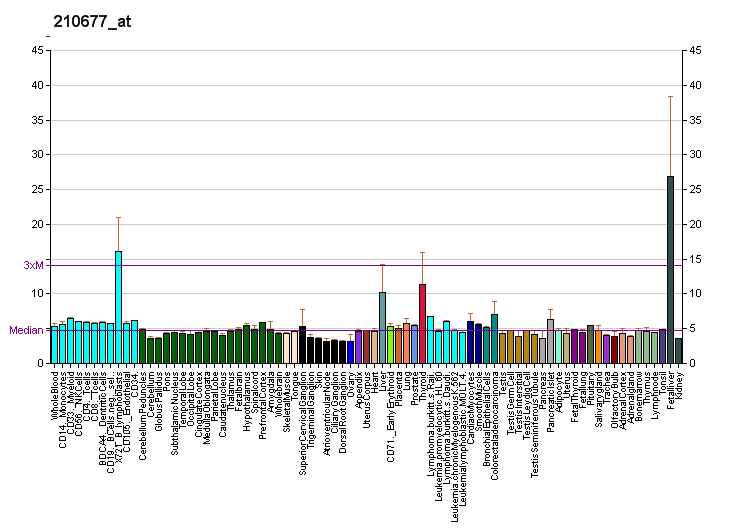
RNA expression pattern
Bgee	Human / Mouse (ortholog); Top expressed in: jejunal mucosa; testicle; gonad; duodenum; spleen; right lobe of liver; gastric mucosa; tibial nerve; thoracic aorta; ascending aorta / Top expressed in: yolk sac; jejunum; intestinal villus; Ileal epithelium; duodenum; left lobe of liver; perirhinal cortex; entorhinal cortex; choroid plexus of fourth ventricle; primitive streak; More reference expression data
BioGPS	More reference expression data
Gene ontology
Molecular function	transferase activity; cholesterol binding; O-acyltransferase activity; fatty-acyl-CoA binding; sterol O-acyltransferase activity; acyltransferase activity; cholesterol O-acyltransferase activity
Cellular component	membrane; integral component of membrane; brush border; endoplasmic reticulum; endoplasmic reticulum membrane
Biological process	very-low-density lipoprotein particle assembly; steroid metabolic process; macrophage derived foam cell differentiation; intestinal cholesterol absorption; cholesterol efflux; lipid metabolism; cholesterol esterification; cholesterol homeostasis; cholesterol metabolic process; low-density lipoprotein particle clearance
Sources:Amigo / QuickGO
Orthologs
Databases	NCBI: entry; OMA: entry
Species	Human	Mouse
Entrez	8435	223920
Ensembl	ENSG00000167780	ENSMUSG00000023045
UniProt	O75908	O88908
RefSeq (mRNA)	NM_003578	NM_146064
RefSeq (protein)	NP_003569	NP_666176
Location (UCSC)	Chr 12: 53.1 – 53.12 Mb	Chr 15: 102.06 – 102.07 Mb
PubMed search
- Wikidata
View/Edit Human	View/Edit Mouse

Sterol O-acyltransferase 2, also known as SOAT2, is an enzyme that in humans is encoded by the SOAT2 gene.

== Function ==
This gene is a member of a small family of Acyl-CoA:cholesterol acyltransferases. The gene encodes a membrane-bound enzyme localized in the endoplasmic reticulum that produces intracellular cholesterol esters from long-chain fatty acyl CoA and cholesterol. The cholesterol esters are then stored as cytoplasmic lipid droplets inside the cell. The enzyme is implicated in cholesterol absorption in the intestine and in the assembly and secretion of apolipoprotein B-containing lipoproteins such as very-low-density lipoprotein (VLDL). Several alternatively spliced transcript variants of this gene have been described, but their full-length nature is not known.
