= WRKY =

WRKY may refer to:

- WRKY (AM), a radio station (1490 AM) licensed to serve Lancaster, Pennsylvania
- WRKY-FM, a radio station (104.9 FM) licensed to Hollidaysburg, Pennsylvania
- WRKY transcription factor, proteins that bind DNA
- WRKY protein domain, a protein domain within the WRKY transcription factor
- WBZB, a radio station (1130 AM) licensed to Murray, Kentucky, which held the call sign WRKY from 2000 to 2006
- WNKV (FM), a radio station (103.5 FM) licensed to Burgettstown, Pennsylvania, which held the call sign WRKY from 1974 to 2000
