= TMEM155 =

Protein and gene in humans

Identifiers
- Aliases: TMEM155, transmembrane protein 155
- External IDs: GeneCards: TMEM155

Gene location (Human)
Chr.	Chromosome 4 (human)
Band	4q27	Start	121,758,930 bp
Band	4q27	End	121,765,427 bp
RNA expression pattern
Bgee	Human / Mouse (ortholog); Top expressed in: Brodmann area 46; endothelial cell; prefrontal cortex; dorsolateral prefrontal cortex; Brodmann area 23; middle temporal gyrus; Brodmann area 9; superior frontal gyrus; primary visual cortex; right frontal lobe / n/a; More reference expression data
BioGPS	n/a
Orthologs
Databases	NCBI: entry; OMA: entry
Species	Human	Mouse
Entrez	132332	n/a
Ensembl	ENSG00000164112	n/a
UniProt	Q4W5P6	n/a
RefSeq (mRNA)	NM_152399; NM_001317839; NM_001317837; NM_001317838; NM_001317841 NM_001317842; NM_001369019	n/a
RefSeq (protein)	NP_001304766; NP_001304767; NP_001304768; NP_001304770; NP_001304771 NP_689612; NP_001355948	n/a
Location (UCSC)	Chr 4: 121.76 – 121.77 Mb	n/a
PubMed search		n/a
- Wikidata
View/Edit Human

Transmembrane protein 155 is a protein that in humans is encoded by the TMEM155 gene. It is located on human chromosome 4, spanning 6,497 bases. It is also referred to as FLJ30834 and LOC132332. This protein is known to be expressed mainly in the brain, placenta, and lymph nodes and is conserved throughout most placental mammals. The function and structure of this protein is still not well understood, but its level of expression has been studied pertaining to various pathologies.

== Gene ==
=== Locus ===
TMEM155 is located on the minus strand of human chromosome 4 (4q27) and spans 13,611 base pairs.

=== Genetic Neighborhood ===
Cytogenetic band: 4q27

TMEM155 is neighbored by TMEM155 is neighbored on chromosome 4 by CCNA2, a gene encoding for cyclin A2, and ANXA5, which encodes annexin A5. It is also neighbored by PP12613 located on the positive strand.

=== Size ===
The gene on chromosome 4 encoding for TMEM155 spans 6,487 nucleotides. This gene spans from base pairs 121,758,930 and 121,765,427 on chromosome 4. The longest variant ofTMEM155 has 5 exons detailed in the table below:

Exon #	Base pairs	Length (bp)
1	1-348	348
2	349-457	108
3	458-529	71
4	530-884	354
5	885-2429	1544

== mRNA ==
=== Isoforms ===
There are 7 isoforms of TMEM155 precursor mRNA. TMEM155 isoform 5 is the longest mRNA and is 2,429 bp long. The shortest isoform is variant 4 and this variant is 2,035 bp long. Isoforms are detailed in the table below.

Isoform Number	Length (bp)	Exons
Isoform 1	2,295	6
Isoform 2	2,160	6
Isoform 3	2,157	6
Isoform 4	2,035	6
Isoform 5	2,429	5
Isoform 6	2,294	5
Isoform 7	2,292	6

== Protein ==
=== Primary Structure ===
TMEM155 protein is 130 amino acids in length. The TMEM155 protein in its full form is 14.2 kD in molecular weight with an isoelectric point of 10.29 Without its signal peptide it is 11.8 kD. The protein interacts with the membrane once, with one transmembrane domain as seen below.

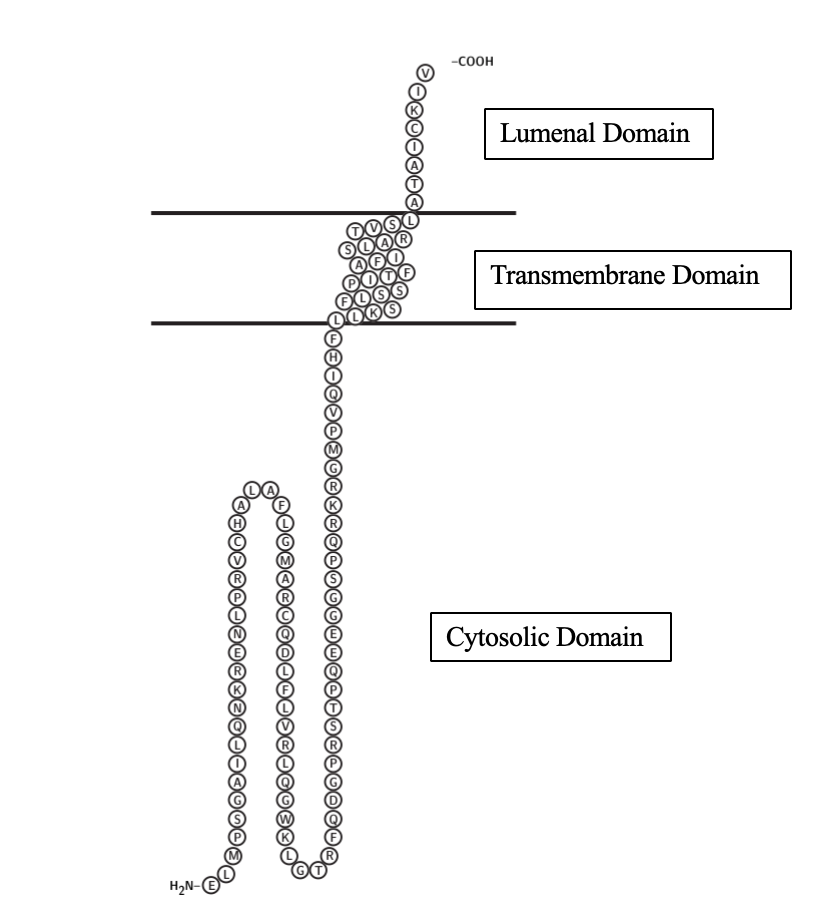
TMEM155 has a single transmembrane domain through the membrane of the ER.

=== Secondary Structure ===
TMEM155 has a secondary structure composed of 23.5% alpha-helices, 67% beta-sheets, 9.5% turns and coils.

=== Tertiary structure ===
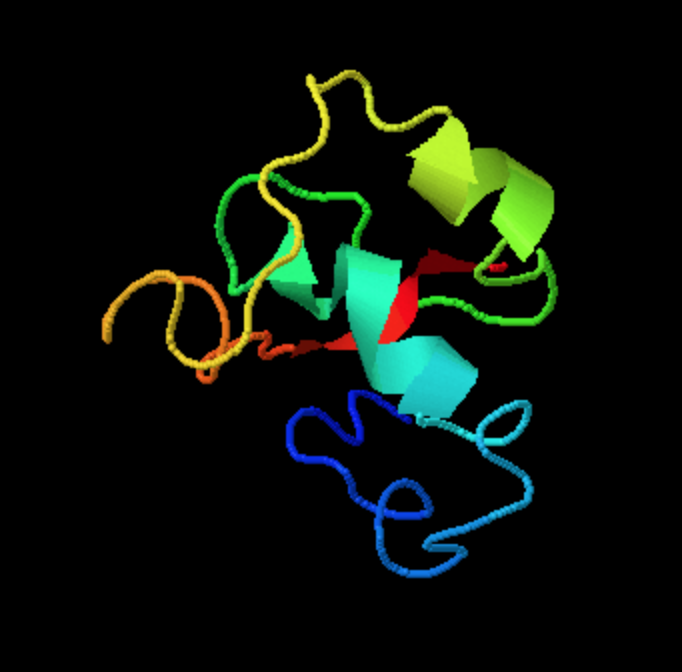
Predicted tertiary structure of TMEM155

The tertiary structure of TMEM155 is predicted in the image on the right. This is predicted to be the structure of the N-terminus tail of TMEM155 located inside the ER membrane.

=== Post-translational modifications ===
TMEM155 has sites for O-glycosylation at ser78, thr79, and pro80. It has sites for O-GlcNac at thr79 and ser121 It is a target for sumoylation from ile126 to val130. There is a glycation site at lys102.

=== Subcellular Localization ===
TMEM155 contains a sequence which functions as an ER retention signal.

=== Interacting Proteins ===
TMEM155 interacts with LMBR1 and TMEM259. LMBR1 is a known lipocalin transmembrane receptor. TMEM259 is another transmembrane protein.

== Regulation ==
=== Gene Level Regulation ===
There are several promoters of the TMEM155 gene. The promoter region of the gene is bound by several transcription factors involved in regulating chromatin structure, development, cell cycle, and immune responses. TMEM155 is expressed highly in the brain, placenta, and lymph nodes. Below is a table detailing the transcription factor binding sites for the GXP_319937 promoter of TMEM155. The table below details the transcription factors that bind the promoter region of TMEM155 and the sequences which they bind.

Orthologs of TMEM155
Transcription factor	Detailed matrix information	Anchor base	Sequence
RUSH	SWI/SNF related, matrix associated, actin dependent regulator of chromatin, subfamily a, member 3	29	gtgtACTTttc
RUSH		716	tggaACTTtta
BRAC	T-box transcription factor TBX20	96	gtgctatgAGGTgtctgagtg
HOMF	Barx2, homeobox transcription factor that preferentially binds to paired TAAT motifs	235	aataaatTAATtgggaacg
HOMF		232	tcccaatTAATttatttcg
FKHD	Alternative splicing variant of FOXP1, activated in ESCs	303	tttacaaAACAccagtc
FKHD		16	TTTACAAAACACCAGTC
TF2B	Transcription factor II B (TFIIB) recognition element	616	ccgCGCC
RBP2	Jumonji, AT rich interactive domain 1B	1083	GCACagcgc
EVI1	MEL1 (MDS1/EVI1-like gene 1) DNA-binding domain 2	139	cagtgaaGATGgggtct
SMAD	Smad3 transcription factor involved in TGF-beta signaling	1071	gggGTCTgggc
MYOD	Transcription factor E2a (E12/E47)	605	CAGCtg
ETSF	Ets variant 1	702	gaagagcaGGAAgaagaa
ETSF		366	gtgcccgcGGAAgttcgctcc
E2FF	E2F transcription factor 1	562	gaggGGCGggagtgcgg
E2FF		868	cactGGCGggagggcac
NFAT	Nuclear factor of activated T-cells	467	agctgaGGAAatccggcgc
NFAT		488	ctccgaGGAAacgcgccaa
EGRF	Wilms Tumor Suppressor	1018	tcctgtgGGAGgcccgggg
STAT	Signal transducer and activator of transcription 3	944	cagcTTCCaggtgcggggc

=== Transcript Level Regulation ===
There are 4 splice enhancers of TMEM155. These enhancer sites come on the 5' end of the TMEM155 gene and contain binding sites for transcription factors RCOR1, MILLT1, SIN3A, NFIC, STAT3, JUNB, FOS, EGR1, PHB2, RUNX3, and SRF. Many of these transcription factors are involved with regulation cell growth and tumor suppression.

== Mutations ==
There are several notable SNPs in the coding sequence of TMEM155. These mutations include mostly missense and nonsense mutations. The table below summarizes the mutations found in TMEM155 in the conserved bases.

Position in Protein	Mutation Type	Codon Position	Change in nucleic acid	Change in amino acid	Rs Number
27	Missense	3	G → A	M → I	rs754134166
28	Missense	1	C → G	P → A	rs1056097623
34	Nonsense	1	C → T	Q → STOP	rs148344547
44	Missense	2	G → C	C → Y	rs1396459508
45	Missense	2	A → G	H → R	rs761510691
49	Missense	3	T → G	F → L	rs746407759
51	Missense	1	G → A	G → R	rs1251128996
52	Missense	2	T → C	M → T	rs1164776956
55	Nonsense	3	G → A	C → STOP	rs749417444
56	Missense	1	C → A	Q → K	rs1428301882
60	Missense	3	G → C	L → F	rs756351338
61	Missense	1	G → T	V → F	rs1268180828
65	Missense	1	G → T	G → W	rs1344535938
65	Missense	2	G → T	G → V	rs1267210743
68	Missense	1	C → T	L → F	rs957334475
71	Missense	2	G → A	R → K	rs1437581701

== Evolution ==
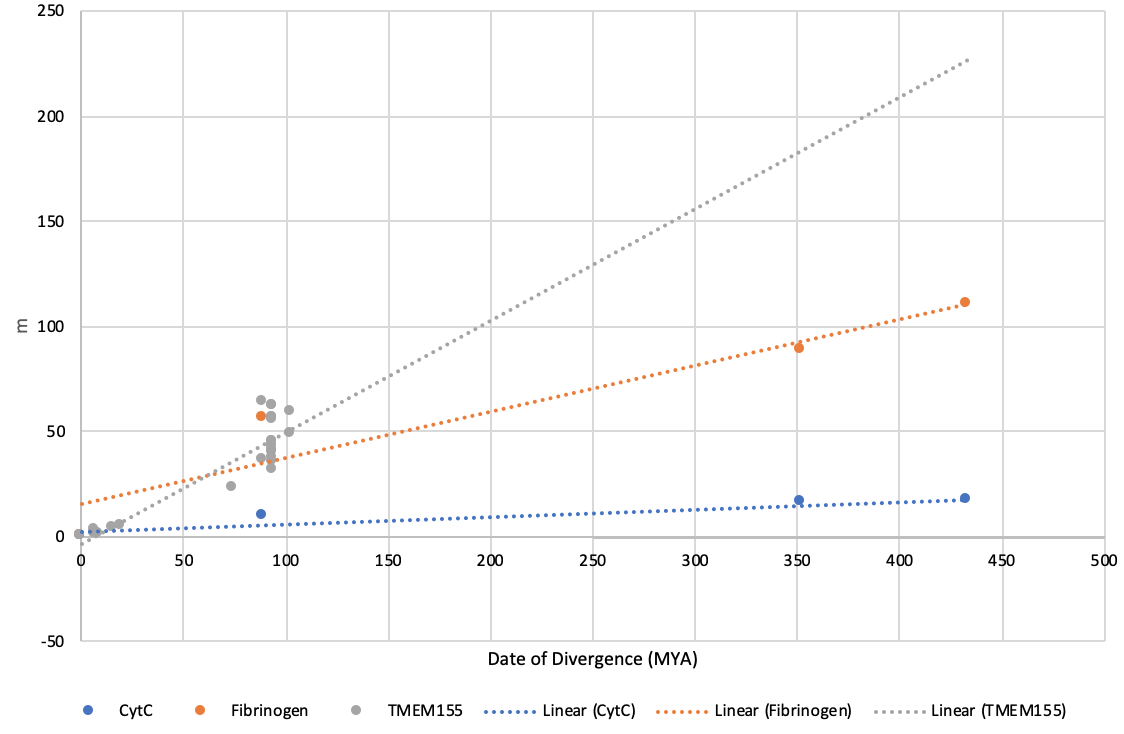
Divergence rate of TMEM155 compared to known fast diverging gene, fibrinogen, and slowly diverging gene, CytC. This graph shows the percent change in amino acid sequence over the date of divergence of the sequence from humans.

TMEM155 is evolving at the molecular level rather quickly. When compared to fibrinogen protein rate of evolution, the TMEM155 appears to be accumulating more amino acid changes in a shorter amount of time. Because it is faster than the quickly evolving fibrinogen, it is also evolving faster than cytochrome C protein, which is known to evolve slowly.

== Homology ==
TMEM155 is conserved across most placental mammals. DoD (MYA) refers to how many million years ago the gene diverged from the human version of the gene.

Genus and Species	Common name	Taxomic group	DoD (MYA)	Accession number	Sequence length (aa)	E-value	Percent Identity	Percent Similarity
Homo sapiens	Human	Hominidae	0	NP_001304768.2	130	0.00E+00	100.00%	100.00%
Pan troglodytes	Chimpanzee	Hominidae	6.4	XP_016807629.1	154	2.00E-87	99.00%	99.00%
Pan paniscus	Bonobo	Hominidae	6.4	XP_008967732.1	130	7.00E-87	96.90%	97.70%
Gorilla gorilla gorilla	Gorilla	Hominidae	8.6	XP_004040390.1	130	1.00E-88	99.20%	99.20%
Pongo pygmaeus	Bornean orangutan	Hominidae	15.2	NP_001127639.1	130	2.00E-85	96.20%	97.70%
Hylobates moloch	Silvery gibbon	Hylobatidae	19.8	XP_032002524.1	130	1.00E-84	95.40%	96.90%
Propithecus coquereli	Coquerel's sifaka	Indriidae	74.1	XP_012505863.1	127	2.00E-68	79.80%	84.60%
Fukomys damarensis	Damara mole-rat	Bathyeridae	89	XP_010609341.1	132	1.00E-52	69.70%	77.30%
Oryctolagus cuniculus	European rabbit	Leporidae	89	XP_017203042.1	109	2.00E-39	52.90%	58.80%
Camelus dromedarius	Dromedary	Camelidae	94	XP_031322500	106	7.00E-47	73.10%	82.70%
Lynx canadensis	Canada Lynx	Felidae	94	XP_030169002	100	4.00E-44	70.20%	76.90%
Bison bison bison	Bison	Bovidae	94	XP_010856646	190	3.00E-54	69.20%	76.90%
Delphinapterus leucas	Beluga whale	Monodontidae	94	XP_022452038	100	6.00E-42	67.30%	76.00%
Ceratotherium simum simum	Southern white rhinoceros	Rhinocerotidae	94	XP_014639974	192	4.00E-47	67.00%	75.50%
Ursus arctos horribilis	Grizzly bear	Ursidae	94	XP_026355049.1	126	3.00E-52	66.20%	72.20%
Neomonachus schauinslandi	Hawaiian monk seal	Phocidae	94	XP_021537176	126	9.00E-52	65.40%	73.10%
Ailuropoda melanoleuca	Giant panda	Ursidae	94	XP_019660004	100	5.00E-40	63.60%	70.10%
Mustela erminea	Stoat	Mustelidae	94	XP_032189210	127	8.00E-43	63.50%	69.20%
Vicugna pacos	Alpaca	Camelidae	94	XP_015106166.1	106	3.00E-46	57.60%	64.40%
Zalophus californianus	California sea lion	Otariidae	94	XP_027455522.1	109	4.00E-44	56.90%	64.60%
Sus scrofa	Wild boar	Suidae	94	XP_020957297.1	104	7.00E-38	56.90%	64.60%
Monodon monoceros	Narwhal	Monodontidae	94	XP_029091564.1	100	1.00E-42	53.80%	61.50%
Panthera pardus	Leopard	Felidae	94	XP_019274438.1	98	1.00E-38	53.80%	60.00%
Loxodonta africana	African bush elephant	Elephantidae	102	XP_023404270.1	127	2.00E-36	61.50%	71.20%
Dasypus novemcinctus	Nine-banded armadillo	Dasypodidae	102	XP_023439327.1	103	1.00E-41	55.70%	61.10%

== Clinical significance ==
=== Ocular tissues ===
The upregulation of TMEM155 has been found in basal cell nevus syndrome fibroblasts. TMEM155 was also found to be upregulated in corneal keratinocytes, which could contribute to the upregulation of the gene being associated with nystagmus.

=== Brain tissues ===
TMEM155 regulation co-varies with families that have instances of essential tremor,

=== Female reproductive tissues ===
Hypermethylated TMEM155 is a potential biomarker for HER2+ breast cancer. The expression of TMEM155 was found to be higher in the oocytes of women with low antral follicular count, meaning it could be involved in the regulation of female fertility.
