= TBX20 =

Protein-coding gene in the species Homo sapiens

Identifiers
- Aliases: TBX20, T-box 20, ASD4, T-box transcription factor 20
- External IDs: OMIM: 606061; MGI: 1888496; GeneCards: TBX20

Gene location (Human)
| Chr. | Chromosome 7 (human) |
| Band | 7p14.2 | Start | 35,202,430 bp |
| Band | 7p14.2 | End | 35,254,100 bp |

Gene location (Mouse)
| Chr. | Chromosome 9 (mouse) |
| Band | 9|9 A4 | Start | 24,629,434 bp |
| Band | 9|9 A4 | End | 24,685,599 bp |
RNA expression pattern
| Bgee | Human / Mouse (ortholog); Top expressed in: right auricle of heart; left ventricle; testicle; apex of heart; right coronary artery; gallbladder; left coronary artery; urinary bladder; ascending aorta; placenta / Top expressed in: aortic valve; atrium; atrioventricular valve; endocardial cushion; myocardium; myocardium of ventricle; ascending aorta; umbilical cord; Cardiac muscle tissue of myocardium; iris; More reference expression data |
| BioGPS | n/a |
Gene ontology
| Molecular function | DNA binding; transcription coactivator activity; RNA polymerase II transcription regulatory region sequence-specific DNA binding; DNA-binding transcription factor activity; DNA-binding transcription activator activity, RNA polymerase II-specific; RNA polymerase II cis-regulatory region sequence-specific DNA binding; DNA-binding transcription factor activity, RNA polymerase II-specific |
| Cellular component | cytoplasm; nucleus |
| Biological process | cardiac septum development; pulmonary vein morphogenesis; muscle contraction; regulation of transcription, DNA-templated; negative regulation of SMAD protein complex assembly; aortic valve morphogenesis; outflow tract morphogenesis; cardiac muscle tissue morphogenesis; neuron migration; negative regulation of transcription by RNA polymerase II; transcription by RNA polymerase II; blood circulation; transcription, DNA-templated; pulmonary valve formation; embryonic heart tube development; outflow tract septum morphogenesis; endocardial cushion morphogenesis; heart looping; endocardial cushion formation; atrial septum morphogenesis; multicellular organism development; positive regulation of transcription, DNA-templated; lateral mesoderm formation; positive regulation of cardiac muscle cell proliferation; visceral motor neuron differentiation; embryonic heart tube morphogenesis; aortic valve development; pericardium morphogenesis; branching involved in blood vessel morphogenesis; cardiac chamber formation; endoderm formation; cell population proliferation; negative regulation of transcription, DNA-templated; dorsal/ventral pattern formation; cardiac right ventricle morphogenesis; foramen ovale closure; tricuspid valve development; positive regulation of transcription by RNA polymerase II; embryonic heart tube elongation |
Sources:Amigo / QuickGO
Orthologs
| Databases | NCBI: entry; OMA: entry |
| Species | Human | Mouse |
| Entrez | 57057 | 57246 |
| Ensembl | ENSG00000164532 | ENSMUSG00000031965 |
| UniProt | Q9UMR3 | Q9ES03 |
| RefSeq (mRNA) | NM_020417; NM_001077653; NM_001166220 | NM_001205085; NM_020496; NM_194263 |
| RefSeq (protein) | NP_001071121; NP_001159692 | NP_001192014; NP_065242; NP_919239 |
| Location (UCSC) | Chr 7: 35.2 – 35.25 Mb | Chr 9: 24.63 – 24.69 Mb |
| PubMed search |
- Wikidata
| View/Edit Human | View/Edit Mouse |

TBX20 (gene) is a member of the T-box family that encodes the transcription factor TBX20. Studies in mouse, human and fruitfly have shown that this gene is essential for early heart development, adult heart function and yolk sac vasculature remodeling and has been associated with congenital heart diseases. Tbx20 was also shown to be required for migration of hindbrain motor neurons and in facial neurons was proposed to be a positive regulator of the non-canonical Wnt signaling pathway.

Tbx20 is a transcription factor that is essential for proper heart development in a growing fetus. Any mutations in this gene can result in various forms of congenital heart disease. One of the more serious examples is the presence of a septal defect. The interatrial septum is a piece of tissue that separates the left and right atria of the heart, which contain oxygenated and deoxygenated blood, respectively. In Tbx20 mutants, this divider does not form and results in deoxygenated blood flowing into the left atrium then left ventricle, which ships the blood to the organs and muscles. Since deoxygenated blood should not be delivered to the tissues, the result is cyanosis, or a bluish skin discoloration stemming from low oxygen concentration. Proper function of Tbx20 is essential because it controls other genes that regulate cardiomyocyte proliferation, such as Tbx2 and N-myc1. Cardiomyocytes are the basis for the correct architectural scheme of the heart, and if defects arise in these structures, proper heart development is likely unattainable.

== Embryonic heart functions ==
Tbx20 knockout mouse embryos die at around or before E10.5 with hypoplastic hearts.

This gene has been implicated in coordinating cardiac proliferation, regional specification and formation of the cardiac chamber Congenital heart diseases involving TBX20 include defects in septation, chamber growth and valvulogenesis and increased Tbx20 expression was shown to cause congenital atrial septal defects, patent foramen ovale and cardiac valve defects.

== Adult heart functions ==
In the fruitfly, knock-down of mid (midline), Drosophila's Tbx20 homolog gene, led to slower heart rate, arrhythmias and abnormal myofibrillar architecture. Heterozygous Tbx20 knockout adult mice displayed left ventricle dilation, decreased wall thickness and contractile abnormalities. Homozygous conditional cardiomyocyte Tbx20 knockout adult mice died within 15 days after knockout induction. Mice hearts presented with dilated cardiomyopathy and contraction-related dysfunctions such as abnormal atrioventricular conduction, slower heart rate, altered ventricular depolarization/repolarization and arrhythmias.

== Known co-factors ==
Transcription factors GATA4 and NKX2-5 have been shown to physically interact with TBX20 and enhance gene expression.

== Known downstream gene targets ==
Tbx2 was shown to be directly repressed by Tbx20 in the myocardium. Analysis of data from genome-wide chromatin immunoprecipitation against TBX20 tagged with green fluorescent protein in adult (6–8 weeks) mouse whole heart, coupled with analysis of genes differentially expressed upon loss of Tbx20, identified hundreds of putative TBX20 direct targets.
