= TBX3 =

Protein-coding gene in the species Homo sapiens

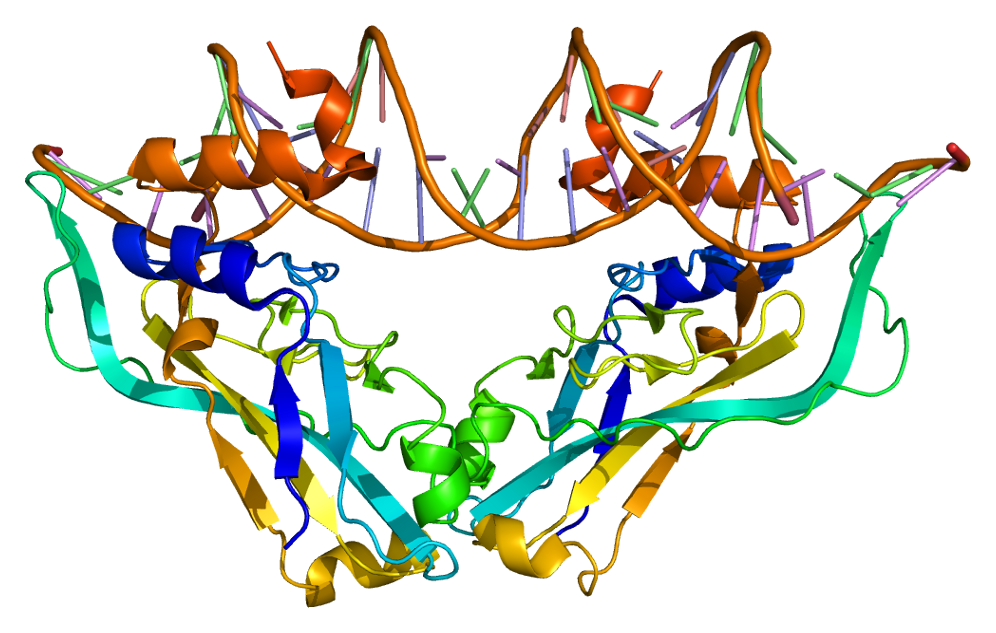

Identifiers
- Aliases: TBX3, TBX3-ISO, UMS, XHL, T-box 3, T-box transcription factor 3
- External IDs: OMIM: 601621; MGI: 98495; GeneCards: TBX3
Available structures
PDB	Ortholog search: PDBe RCSB
PDB	List of PDB id codes 1H6F

Gene location (Human)
Chr.	Chromosome 12 (human)
Band	12q24.21	Start	114,670,255 bp
Band	12q24.21	End	114,684,175 bp

Gene location (Mouse)
Chr.	Chromosome 5 (mouse)
Band	5 F|5 60.34 cM	Start	119,808,734 bp
Band	5 F|5 60.34 cM	End	119,822,789 bp
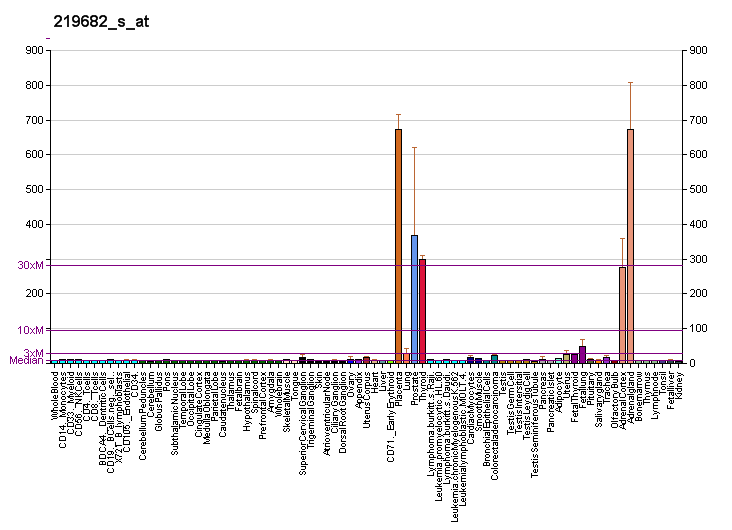
RNA expression pattern
Bgee	Human / Mouse (ortholog); Top expressed in: right adrenal cortex; left adrenal cortex; urethra; stromal cell of endometrium; seminal vesicula; prostate; right lobe of thyroid gland; right lung; left lobe of thyroid gland; placenta / Top expressed in: genital tubercle; medullary collecting duct; transitional epithelium of ureter; lobe of prostate; adrenal gland; seminal vesicula; transitional epithelium of urinary bladder; pelvic ganglion; lumbar spinal ganglion; coelomic epithelium; More reference expression data
BioGPS	More reference expression data
Gene ontology
Molecular function	DNA-binding transcription repressor activity, RNA polymerase II-specific; sequence-specific DNA binding; RNA polymerase II cis-regulatory region sequence-specific DNA binding; DNA-binding transcription factor activity; DNA binding; protein binding; DNA-binding transcription factor activity, RNA polymerase II-specific
Cellular component	nucleus
Biological process	forelimb morphogenesis; cellular senescence; branching involved in mammary gland duct morphogenesis; positive regulation of stem cell proliferation; atrioventricular bundle cell differentiation; negative regulation of epithelial cell differentiation; female genitalia development; transcription, DNA-templated; male genitalia development; multicellular organism development; anterior/posterior axis specification, embryo; outflow tract morphogenesis; skeletal system development; ventricular septum morphogenesis; embryonic forelimb morphogenesis; cardiac muscle cell fate commitment; regulation of transcription by RNA polymerase II; heart morphogenesis; regulation of cell population proliferation; heart looping; negative regulation of myoblast differentiation; specification of animal organ position; stem cell population maintenance; luteinizing hormone secretion; follicle-stimulating hormone secretion; blood vessel development; positive regulation of cell population proliferation; positive regulation of transcription, DNA-templated; roof of mouth development; mammary placode formation; in utero embryonic development; mesoderm morphogenesis; regulation of transcription, DNA-templated; limb morphogenesis; sinoatrial node cell development; positive regulation of cell cycle; cardiac muscle cell differentiation; limbic system development; embryonic hindlimb morphogenesis; animal organ morphogenesis; embryonic heart tube development; embryonic digit morphogenesis; mammary gland development; negative regulation of transcription by RNA polymerase II; negative regulation of transcription, DNA-templated; negative regulation of apoptotic process
Sources:Amigo / QuickGO
Orthologs
Databases	NCBI: entry; OMA: entry
Species	Human	Mouse
Entrez	6926	21386
Ensembl	ENSG00000135111	ENSMUSG00000018604
UniProt	O15119	P70324
RefSeq (mRNA)	NM_016569; NM_005996	NM_011535; NM_198052
RefSeq (protein)	NP_005987; NP_057653	NP_035665; NP_932169
Location (UCSC)	Chr 12: 114.67 – 114.68 Mb	Chr 5: 119.81 – 119.82 Mb
PubMed search
- Wikidata
View/Edit Human	View/Edit Mouse

T-box transcription factor TBX3 is a protein that in humans is encoded by the TBX3 gene.

T-box 3 (TBX3) is a member of the T-box gene family of transcription factors which all share a highly conserved DNA binding domain known as the T-box. The T-box gene family consists of 17 members in mouse and humans that are grouped into five subfamilies, namely Brachyury (T), T-brain (Tbr1), TBX1, TBX2, and TBX6. Tbx3 is a member of the Tbx2 subfamily which includes Tbx2, Tbx4 and Tbx5. The human TBX3 gene maps to chromosome 12 at position 12q23-24.1 and consists of 7 exons which encodes a 723 amino acid protein (ENSEMBL assembly release GRCh38.p12).

== Transcript splicing ==
Alternative processing and splicing results in at least 4 distinct TBX3 isoforms with TBX3 and TBX3+2a being the predominant isoforms. TBX3+2a results from alternative splicing of the second intron which leads to the addition of the +2a exon and consequently this isoform has an additional 20 amino acids within the T-box DNA binding domain. The functions of TBX3 and TBX3+2a may vary slightly across different cell types.

== Structure and function ==
TBX3 has domains which are important for its transcription factor function which include a DNA-binding domain (DBD) also called the T-box, a nuclear localization signal, two repression domains (R2 and R1) and an activation domain (A). The T-box recognizes a palindromic DNA sequence (T(G/C)ACACCT AGGTGTGAAATT) known as the T-element, or half sites within this sequence called half T-elements, although it can also recognize variations within the consensus T-element sequences. While there are 29 predicted phosphorylation sites in the TBX3 protein only the SP190, SP692 and S720 have been fully characterized. The kinases involved are cyclin A-CDK2 at either SP190 or SP354, p38 mitogen-activated protein (MAP) kinase at SP692 in embryonic kidney cells and AKT3 at S720 in melanoma. These modifications act in a context dependent manner to promote TBX3 protein stability, nuclear localization and transcriptional activity.

TBX3 can activate and/or repress its target genes by binding a T-element, or half T-element sites. Indeed, Tbx3 binds highly conserved T-elements to activate the promoters of Eomes, T, Sox17 and Gata6, which are factors essential for mesoderm differentiation and extra embryonic endodermal. Furthermore, in the cancer context, TBX3 directly represses the cell cycle regulators p19^{ARF}/p14^{ARF}, p21^{WAF1} and TBX2 as well as E-cadherin which encodes a cell adhesion molecule, to promote proliferation and migration. TBX3 directly represses a region of the PTEN promoter which lacks putative T-elements, but which forms an important regulatory unit for PTEN transcriptional activators, thus raising the possibility that TBX3 may also repress some of its target genes through interfering with transcriptional activators.

The function of TBX3 as either a transcriptional repressor or transcriptional activator is, in part, modulated by protein co-factors. For example, it can interact with other transcription factors such as Nkx2-5, Msx 1/2 and Sox4 to assist it binding to its target genes to regulate heart development and it can interact with histone deacetylases (HDACs) 1, 2, 3 and 5 to repress p14ARF in breast cancer and with HDAC5 to repress E-cadherin to promote metastasis in hepatocellular carcinoma. Lastly, TBX3 can also co-operate with other factors to inhibit the process of mRNA splicing by directly binding RNAs containing the core motif of a T-element. Indeed, TBX3 interacts with Coactivator of AP1 and Estrogen Receptor (CAPERα) to repress the long non-coding RNA, Urothelial Cancer Associated 1 (UCA1), which leads to the bypass of senescence through the stabilization of p16INK4a mRNA.

TBX3 has been functionally connected to the regulation of the Wnt signalling, thereby providing a novel explanation of how signalling pathways are orchestrated by tissue-specific transcription factors.

== Role in development ==
During mouse embryonic development, Tbx3 is expressed in the inner cell mass of the blastocyst, in the extraembryonic mesoderm during gastrulation, and in the developing heart, limbs, musculoskeletal structures, mammary glands, nervous system, skin, eye, liver, pancreas, lungs and genitalia. Tbx3 null embryos show defects in, among other structures, the heart, mammary glands and limbs and they die in utero by embryonic day E16.5, most likely due to yolk sac and heart defects. These observations together with numerous other studies have illustrated that Tbx3 plays crucial roles in the development of the heart, mammary glands, limbs and lungs. TBX3 has been implicated in the regulation of Wnt target genes by tissue-specific crosstalk with the protein BCL9.

== Role in stem cells ==
Embryonic stem cells (ESCs) and adult stem cells, are undifferentiated cells which when they divide have the potential to either remain a stem cell or to differentiate into other specialized cells. Adult stem cells are multipotent progenitor cells found in numerous adult tissues and, as part of the body repair system, they can develop into more than one cell type but they are more limited than ESCs. TBX3 is highly expressed in mouse ESCs (mESCs) and appears to have a dual role in these cells. Firstly it can enhance and maintain stem cell pluripotency by preventing differentiation and enhancing self-renewal and secondly it can maintain the pluripotency and differentiation potential of mESCS. Induced pluripotent stem cells (iPSCs) are ESC-like cells that can generate scalable quantities of relevant tissue and are of major interest for their application in personalized regenerative medicine, drug screening, and for our understanding of the cell signaling networks that regulate embryonic development and disease. In vitro studies have shown that Tbx3 is an important factor that, together with KLF4, SOX2, OCT4, Nanog, LIN-28A and C-MYC, can reprogram somatic cells to form iPS cells.

== Clinical significance ==
TBX3 has been implicated in human diseases including the ulnar mammary syndrome, obesity, rheumatoid arthritis and cancer.

In humans, heterozygous mutations of TBX3 lead to the autosomal dominant developmental disorder, ulnar mammary syndrome (UMS), which is characterized by a number of clinical features including mammary and apocrine gland hypoplasia, upper limb defects, malformations of areola, dental structures, heart and genitalia. Several UMS causing mutations in the TBX3 gene have been reported which include 5 nonsense, 8 frameshift (due to deletion, duplication and insertion), 3 missense and 2 splice site mutations. Missense mutations within the T-domain, or the loss of RD1 result in aberrant transcripts and truncated proteins of TBX3. These mutations lead to reduced DNA binding, transcriptional control and splicing regulation of TBX3 and the loss of function and are associated with the most severe phenotype of UMS.

Tbx3 is expressed in heterogenous populations of hypothalamic arcuate nucleus neurons which control energy homeostasis by regulating appetite and energy expenditure and the ablation of TBX3 function in these neurons was shown to cause obesity in mouse models. Importantly, Tbx3 was shown to be a key player in driving the functional heterogeneity of hypothalamic neurons and this function was conserved in mice, drosophila and humans. Genome wide association studies also causally linked TBX3 to rheumatoid arthritis (RA) susceptibility and a recent study identified Tbx3 as a candidate gene for RA in collagen-induced arthritis (CIA) mouse models. The severity of RA directly correlated with TBX3 serum levels in the CIA mouse models. Furthermore, Tbx3 was shown to repress B lymphocyte proliferation and to activate the humoral immune response which is associated with chronic inflammation of the synovium leading to RA. Tbx3 may thus be an important player in regulating the immune system and could be used as a biomarker for the diagnosis of RA severity.

TBX3 is overexpressed in a wide range of carcinomas (breast, pancreatic, melanoma, liver, lung, gastric, ovarian, bladder and head and neck cancers) and sarcomas (chondrosarcoma, fibrosarcoma, liposarcoma, rhabdomyosarcoma and synovial sarcoma) and there is compelling evidence that it contributes to several hallmarks of cancer. Indeed, TBX3 can bypass cellular senescence, apoptosis and anoikis as well as promote uncontrolled cell proliferation, tumor formation, angiogenesis and metastasis. Furthermore, TBX3 contributes to the expansion of cancer stem cells (CSCs) and is a key player in regulating pluripotency-related genes in these cells. CSCs contribute to tumor relapse and drug resistance and thus this may be another mechanism by which TBX3 contributes to cancer formation and tumor aggressiveness. The mechanisms by which TBX3 contributes to oncogenic processes involve, in part, its ability to inhibit the tumor suppressor pathways p14^{ARF}/p53/p21^{WAF1/CIP1}, p16^{INK4a}/pRb, p57^{KIP2}, PTEN, E-cadherin and activating the angiogenesis-associated genes FGF2 and VEGF-A and the EMT gene SNAI. Some of the oncogenic signaling molecules identified that upregulate TBX3 include TGF-β, BRAF-MAPK, c-Myc, AKT, and PLC_{ᗴ}/PKC. The function of TBX3 is also regulated by phosphorylation by the p38-MAPK, AKT3 and cyclin A/CDK2 and by protein co-factors, which include PRC2, Histone Deacetylases 1, 2, 3 and 5 and CAPERα.

There is also evidence that TBX3 may function as a tumour suppressor. During oncogenesis, TBX3 is silenced by methylation in some cancers and this was associated with a poor overall survival, resistance to cancer therapy and a more invasive phenotype. In addition, TBX3 is overexpressed in fibrosarcoma cells and removing TBX3 from these cells led to a more aggressive phenotype.
