= TBX4 =

Protein-coding gene in humans

Identifiers
- Aliases: TBX4, SPS, ICPPS, T-box 4, T-box transcription factor 4, PAPPAS
- External IDs: OMIM: 601719; MGI: 102556; GeneCards: TBX4

Gene location (Human)
Chr.	Chromosome 17 (human)
Band	17q23.2	Start	61,452,404 bp
Band	17q23.2	End	61,485,110 bp

Gene location (Mouse)
Chr.	Chromosome 11 (mouse)
Band	11 C|11 51.42 cM	Start	85,777,248 bp
Band	11 C|11 51.42 cM	End	85,806,923 bp
RNA expression pattern
Bgee	Human / Mouse (ortholog); Top expressed in: right lung; upper lobe of left lung; Achilles tendon; cartilage tissue; tibial arteries; lower lobe of lung; urinary bladder; placenta; prostate; gallbladder / Top expressed in: secondary oocyte; zygote; allantois; left lung lobe; primary oocyte; right lung; right lung lobe; human penis; genital tubercle; abdominal wall; More reference expression data
BioGPS	n/a
Gene ontology
Molecular function	DNA binding; DNA-binding transcription factor activity; DNA-binding transcription factor activity, RNA polymerase II-specific
Cellular component	nucleus
Biological process	morphogenesis of an epithelium; skeletal system morphogenesis; limb morphogenesis; embryonic limb morphogenesis; angiogenesis; transcription, DNA-templated; lung development; regulation of transcription, DNA-templated; multicellular organism development; regulation of transcription by RNA polymerase II
Sources:Amigo / QuickGO
Orthologs
Databases	NCBI: entry; OMA: entry
Species	Human	Mouse
Entrez	9496	21387
Ensembl	ENSG00000121075	ENSMUSG00000000094
UniProt	P57082	P70325
RefSeq (mRNA)	NM_018488; NM_001321120	NM_011536; NM_172798
RefSeq (protein)	NP_001308049; NP_060958	NP_035666; NP_766386
Location (UCSC)	Chr 17: 61.45 – 61.49 Mb	Chr 11: 85.78 – 85.81 Mb
PubMed search
- Wikidata
View/Edit Human	View/Edit Mouse

T-box transcription factor Tbx4 is a transcription factor that belongs to T-box gene family that is involved in the regulation of embryonic developmental processes. The transcription factor is encoded by the TBX4 gene located on human chromosome 17. Tbx4 is known mostly for its role in the development of the hindlimb, but it also plays a critical role in the formation of the umbilicus. Tbx4 has been shown to be expressed in the allantois, hindlimb, lung and proctodeum.

== Tissue distribution ==
Tbx4 is expressed in a wide variety of tissues during organogenesis, including the hindlimb, proctodeum, mandibular mesenchyme, lung mesenchyme, atrium of the heart and the body wall. Tbx4 is specifically expressed in the visceral mesoderm of the lung primordium and governs multiple processes during respiratory tract development such as initial endodermal bud development, respiratory endoderm formation, and septation of the respiratory tract and esophagus. Along with Tbx4, Tbx5 is also expressed to help with development of limbs. Tbx4 is expressed in the hindlimb, whereas Tbx5 is expressed in the forelimb, heart, and dorsal side of the retina.

== Function ==
Tbx4 is a transcription factor and a member of the T-box family, which play important roles in fetal development.

In the developing embryo, Fibroblast growth factor (FGF) signaling plays a key role in limb initiation. A gradient of retinoic acid establishes combinatorial patterns of Hox expression along the body axis, leading regions of the paraxial mesoderm to signal the lateral mesoderm and induce expression of Tbx4 and Tbx5. These factors stimulate the secretion of FGF-10, which in turn induces the overlying ectoderm to produce FGF-8. Together, FGF-8 and FGF-10 promote limb outgrowth.

Tbx4 expression is regulated by a "caudal" Hox code that includes activation of the Pitx1 gene, conferring positional identity. The protein product is essential for limb development, particularly during limb bud initiation. In chickens, for example, Tbx4 specifies hindlimb identity. Activation of Tbx4 and other T-box proteins by Hox genes initiates signaling cascades involving the Wnt signaling pathway and FGF signals in limb buds. These cascades establish the apical ectodermal ridge (AER) and zone of polarizing activity (ZPA)—two key signaling centers that direct the orientation and growth of the developing limb.

In addition to its role in outgrowth, Tbx4 cooperates with Tbx5 to pattern the soft tissues of the musculoskeletal system, including muscles and tendons. In zebrafish, mutations in the nuclear localisation signal of Tbx4 result in the absence of pelvic fin structures, which are homologous to tetrapod hindlimbs.

== Clinical significance ==
Mutations in TBX4 and related genes are associated with a range of developmental disorders affecting the limbs, pelvis, lungs, and vascular system. One of the most severe conditions is tetra-amelia syndrome, characterized by the absence of all four limbs and anomalies of the skull, face, eyes, urogenital system, heart, lungs, and central nervous system. In a study by Naiche et al., a knockout mouse lacking Tbx4 expression failed to develop limbs, demonstrating the gene’s essential role in limb formation.

Duplication of the 17q23.1–q23.2 region, which includes TBX4, has been reported in cases of congenital clubfoot. TBX4 duplication within this locus has been identified as the causative factor for this phenotype. Disruption of Tbx4, Tbx5, or the downstream FGF-8/FGF-10 signaling pathway can also result in severe limb reduction defects, including the complete absence of one or more limbs.

Loss-of-function mutations in TBX4 cause the autosomal dominant disorder small patella syndrome (also called Scott-Taor syndrome), characterized by patellar aplasia and malformations of the pelvis and feet. Homozygous null mutations, in which both parental copies of TBX4 are lost, were reported by Bruno Reversade and colleagues to result in the complete absence of hind limbs in human fetuses. This lethal condition is known as posterior amelia with pelvic and pulmonary hypoplasia syndrome (PAPPAS).

Mutations in TBX4 associated with small patella syndrome have also been linked to childhood-onset pulmonary arterial hypertension (PAH). Deletion of 17q23.2 (encompassing TBX4) or point mutations in TBX4 are found in ~30% of childhood-onset PAH cases, but occur far less frequently in adults (~2%).

In mouse models, site-directed mutagenesis of Tbx4 has revealed additional developmental roles. Homozygous null alleles disrupt development of the allantois, preventing chorioallantoic fusion and resulting in embryonic death at ~10.5 days post coitus. Mutant embryos display apoptotic and stunted allantoises with abnormal endothelial differentiation, leading to failure of vascular remodeling.
