= WRKY transcription factor =

Proteins that bind DNA

WRKY transcription factors (pronounced ‘worky’) are proteins that bind DNA. They are transcription factors that regulate many processes in plants and algae (Viridiplantae), such as the responses to biotic and abiotic stresses, senescence, seed dormancy and seed germination and some developmental processes but also contribute to secondary metabolism.

Like many transcription factors, WRKY transcription factors are defined by the presence of a DNA-binding domain; in this case, it is the WRKY domain. The WRKY domain was named in 1996 after the almost invariant WRKY amino acid sequence at the N-terminus and is about 60 residues in length. In addition to containing the ‘WRKY signature’, WRKY domains also possess an atypical zinc-finger structure at the C-terminus (either Cx4-5Cx22-23HxH or Cx7Cx23HxC). Most WRKY transcription factors bind to the W-box promoter element that has a consensus sequence of TTGACC/T.

Individual WRKY proteins do appear in the human protozoan parasite Giardia lamblia and slime mold Dictyostelium discoideum.

== Structural diversity ==
WRKY transcription factors are denoted by a 60-70 amino acid WRKY protein domain composed of a conserved WRKYGQK motif and a zinc-finger region. Based on the amino acid sequence WRKY transcription factors are classified into three major categories, group I, group II, and group III. Group I WRKY proteins are primarily denoted by the presence of two WRKY protein domains, whereas both groups II and III each possess only one domain. Group III WRKY proteins have a C2HC zinc finger instead of the Cys_{2}His_{2} motif of group I and II factors. The structure of several plant WRKY domains has been elucidated using crystallography and nuclear magnetic resonance spectroscopy.

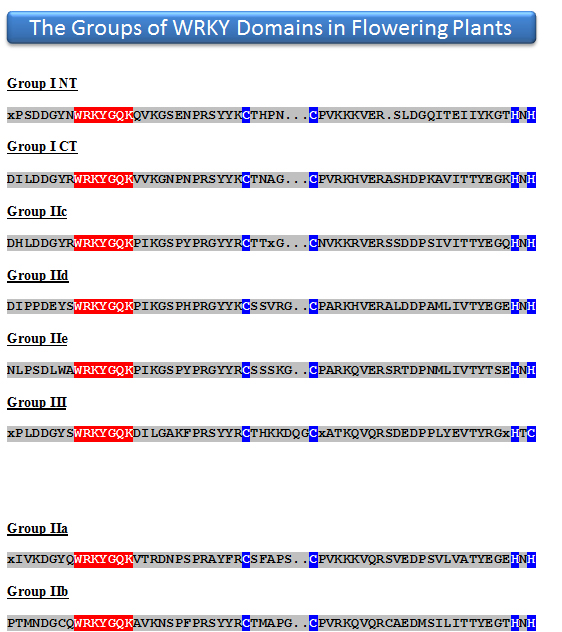
The different groups of WRKY Domains in flowering plants

As soon as the WRKY domain was characterized, it was suggested that it contained a novel zinc finger structure and the first evidence to support this came from studies with 2-phenanthroline that chelates zinc ions. Addition of 2-phenenthroline to gel retardation assays that contained E. coli expressed WRKY proteins resulted in a loss of binding to the W-box target sequence. The other suggestion was that the WRKY signature amino acid sequence at the N-terminus of the WRKY domain directly binds to the W-box sequence in the DNA of target promoters. These suggestions were shown to be correct by publication of the solution structure of the C-terminal WRKY domain of the Arabidopsis WRKY4 protein. The WRKY domain was found to form a four-stranded β-sheet. Soon afterwards, a crystal structure of the C-terminal WRKY domain of the Arabidopsis WRKY1 protein was reported. This showed a similar result to the solution structure except that it may contain an additional β-strand at the N-terminus of the domain. From these two studies it appears that the conserved WRKYGQK signature amino acid sequence enters the major groove of the DNA to bind to the W-Box. Recently, the first structural determination of the WRKY domain complexed with a W-Box was reported. The NMR solution structure of the WRKY DNA-binding domain of Arabidopsis WRKY4 in complex with W Box DNA revealed that part of a four-stranded β-sheet enters the major groove of DNA in an atypical mode that the authors named the β-wedge, where this sheet is almost perpendicular to the DNA helical axis. As initially predicted, amino acids in the conserved WRKYGQK signature motif contact the W Box DNA bases mainly through extensive apolar contacts with thymine methyl groups. These structural data explain the conservation of both the WRKY signature sequence at the N-terminus of the WRKY domain and the conserved cysteine and histidine residues. It also provides the molecular basis for the previously noted remarkable conservation of both the WRKY amino acid signature sequence and the W Box DNA sequence.

== History ==
In 1994 and 1995, the first two reports of WRKY transcription factors appeared. They described newly discovered but as yet ill-defined DNA binding proteins that played potential roles in the regulation of gene expression by sucrose (SPF1) or during germination (ABF1 and ABF2). A third report appeared in 1996 that identified WRKY1, WRKY2 and WRKY3 from parsley. The authors named the new transcription factor family the WRKY family (pronounced ‘worky’) after a conserved amino acid sequence at the N-terminus of the DNA-binding domain. The parsley WRKY proteins also provided the first evidence that WRKY transcription factors play roles in regulating plant responses to pathogens. Numerous papers have now shown this to be a major function of WRKY transcription factors. Since these initial publications, it has become clear that the WRKY family is among the ten largest families of transcription factors in higher plants and that these transcription factors play key roles in regulating a number of plant processes including the responses to biotic and abiotic stresses, germination, senescence, and some developmental processes.

== Evolution ==
WRKY transcription factor genes are found throughout the plant lineage and also outside of the plant lineage in some diplomonads, social amoebae, fungi incertae sedis, and amoebozoa. This patchy distribution suggests that lateral gene transfer is responsible. These lateral gene transfer events appear to pre-date the formation of the WRKY groups in flowering plants, where there are seven well-defined groups, Groups I + IIc, Groups IIa + IIb, Groups IId + IIe, and Group III. Flowering plants also contain proteins with domains typical for both resistance (R) proteins and WRKY transcription factors. R protein-WRKY genes have evolved numerous times in flowering plants, each type being restricted to specific flowering plant lineages. These chimeric proteins contain not only novel combinations of protein domains but also novel combinations and numbers of WRKY domains.

Several early reports proposed that a group I WRKY transcription factor was the progenitor of the family. It was thought that a single group I WRKY domain occurred first and then duplicated to form the original ancestral WRKY transcription factor. However, more recent evidence suggests that WRKY transcription factors evolved from a single group IIc-like gene, which then diversified into group I, group IIc, and group IIa+b domains. The original WRKY protein domain has been proposed to have arisen from the GCM1 and FLYWCH zinc finger factors. GCM1 and FLYWCH are proposed ancestral proteins base on their crystal structural similarity to the WRKY domain. Both GCM1 and FLYWCH belong to families of DNA-binding factors found in metazoan. The plant specific NAC transcription factor family also shares a common structural shape and origin with WRKY transcription factors.

During plant evolution the WRKY family has dramatically expanded, which is proposed to be a result of through duplication. Some species including Arabidopsis thaliana, rice (Oryza sativa), and tomato (Solanum lycopersicum) have WRKY groups which dramatically expanded and diversified in recent evolutionary history. However, differences in expression, not variation in gene sequences, have likely lead to the diverse functions of WRKY genes. Such a model is plausible as WRKY family members are part of numerous phytohormone, developmental, and defense signaling transcriptional networks. Furthermore, W-box elements for WRKY binding occur in promoters of many other WRKY transcription factors indicating not simply a hierarchical rank in gene activation, but also which genes may have arisen later during evolution after initial WRKY regulatory networks were established.

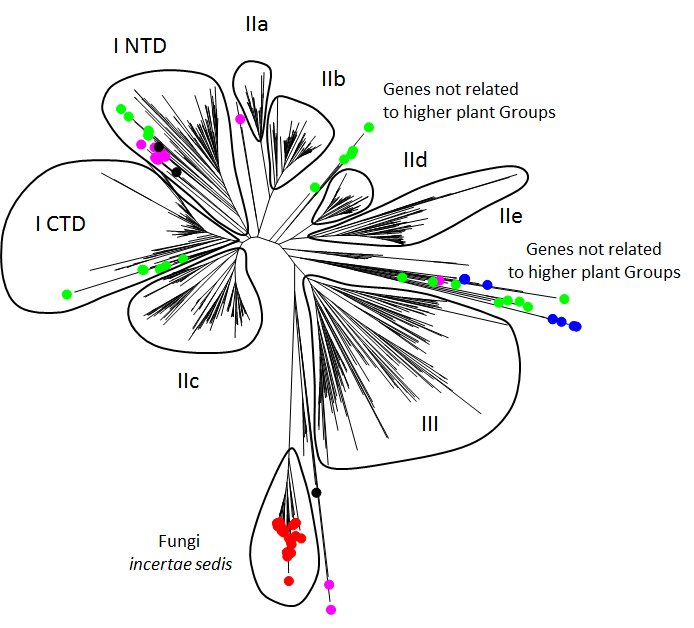
Phylogenetic tree of WRKY transcription factors from the plant kingdom and beyond.

== Function ==
Over the last two decades great effort has been invested in characterizing WRKY transcription factors. The results show that WRKY transcription factors function in a diverse array of plant response, both to internal and external cues.

=== Plant development ===
Studies have demonstrated the function of WRKY transcription factors in plant development. Successful male gametogenesis and tolerance to interploidy crosses both require WRKY transcription factors. Embryo and root development also require WRKY transcription factors. WRKYs also contribute to determination of seed size and seed coat color in Arabidopsis. Furthermore, WRKY transcription factors have been shown to play key roles in regulation of developmentally programmed leaf senescence.

=== Abiotic and biotic stresses ===
One of the most notorious roles of the WRKY transcription factor family is the regulation of plant stress tolerance. WRKYs participate in nearly every aspect of plant defense to abiotic and biotic stressors. WRKYs are known to regulate cold, drought, flooding, heat, heavy metal toxicity, low humidity, osmotic, oxidative, salt and UV stresses. Likewise, WRKY transcription factors play an essential role in plant tolerance to biotic stresses, protecting against innumerable viruses, bacterial and fungal pathogens, as well as insect herbivory. Plants are believed to perceive pathogens via pathogen-associated molecular pattern (PAMP) triggered immunity and effector-triggered immunity. WRKY transcription factors participate in regulating responses to pathogens by targeting PAMP and effector triggered immunity.

=== Hormone signaling ===
WRKY transcription factors function through a variety of plant hormone signaling cascades. Over half of Arabidopsis thaliana WRKY transcription factors respond to salicylic acid treatment. At least 25% of WRKY transcription factors from Madagascar periwinkle (Catharanthus roseus) are responsive to jasmonate. Similarly, in grape (Vitis vinifera) 63%, 73%, 76%, and 81% or WRKY transcription factors are responsive to salicylic acid, ethylene, abscisic acid, and jasmonate treatment, respectively. In Arabidopsis thaliana, two important WRKY transcription factors are WRKY57 and WRKY70. WRKY57 mediates crosstalk between jasmonate and auxin signaling cascades, whereas WRKY70 moderates signaling between the jasmonate and salicylic acid pathways. Arabidopsis thaliana WRKY23 functions downstream of auxin signaling to positively activate expression of flavonols, which function as polar auxin transport inhibitors, to negatively feedback and suppress further auxin responses. Several WRKY transcription factors also respond to gibberellin treatment.

=== Primary and secondary metabolism ===
Due to difficulty in measuring phenotypes, less is known about the roles of WRKY transcription factors in plant metabolism. The earliest reports identified WRKYs based on their ability to regulate β-amylase, a gene involved in catabolism of starch into sugars. Since then, WRKY transcription factors have also been shown to regulate phosphate acquisition and tolerance to arsenic. Additionally, WRKYs are needed for proper expression of lignin biosynthetic pathway genes, which form products necessary for cell wall and xylem formation. Analysis of WRKY transcription factors from numerous plant species indicates the importance of the family in regulating secondary metabolism. WRKY transcription factors also play a role in regulating pathways for the biosynthesis of pharmaceutically valuable plant-specialized metabolites. Efforts to use WRKY transcription factors to improve production of the valuable anti-malarial drug artemisinin have been successful.

== Mode of action ==
A long-standing question of in the field of transcriptional regulation is how large families of regulators binding a consensus DNA sequences dictate expression of different target genes. The WRKY transcription factor family has long exemplified this problem. Plant species contain numerous WRKY transcription factors which predominantly recognize a conserved cis-element. Only recently has it begun to be revealed how different WRKY transcription factors regulate unique sets of target genes.

=== Variation in cis-element recognition ===
Early work indicated that the WRKY family could bind W-box (T/A)TGAC(T/A). Later, a barley (Hordeum vulgare) WRKY transcription factor, SUSIBA2, was found to bind the Sugar Response Element (TAAAGATTACTAATAGGAA), illustrating some diversity exists in DNA sequence which WRKYs could recognize. Since then, WRKYs have been found to bind a more generic GAC core cis-element with flanking sequences dictating DNA-protein interactions. On the protein side differences in the consensus motif and downstream arginine or lysine residues dictate the exact flanking sequence recognized. Additionally, contrary to early reports, both WRKY domains of group I family members can bind DNA. Implications of these results are still being resolved.

=== Protein-protein interactions ===
One mechanism for determining WRKY binding activity is by protein-protein interactions. WRKY transcription factors have been found to interact with a variety of proteins, some of which occur by a group specific manner. Recent evidence suggests that VQ protein family is an important regulator of group I and group IIc WRKY transcription factors. VQ proteins appear to bind the WRKY domain, thus inhibiting protein-DNA interactions. At least one WRKY transcription factor, Arabidopsis WRKY57, interacts with jasmonate ZIM-domain (JAZ) and auxin/indole acetic acid (AUX/IAA) repressor of the jasmonate and auxin signaling cascade, respectively, indicating a point of crosstalk between these phytohormones. Other WRKYs interact with histone deacetylases. Group IIa WRKY factors form homodimers and heterodimers within the subgroup and with other group II subgroups. Group IId WRKY transcription factors typically possess a domain allowing interaction with calcium bound calmodulin.

=== Phosphorylation ===
Protein phosphorylation is a common method to regulate protein activity and WRKY transcription factors are no exception. WRKY gene involved in plant defense, hormone signaling, and secondary metabolism are regulated by phosphorylation via mitogen-activated protein kinase (MAPK) cascades. Additionally, a MAPK can phosphorylate a VQ protein, freeing the WRKY transcription factor for target gene activation. While kinases phosphorylating WRKY transcription factors are known, phosphatases removing phosphate groups have yet to be identified.

=== Proteasomeal degradation ===
Protein degradation via the proteasome is a common feature in plant regulatory networks to limit the duration of activation or repression by transcription factors. WRKY transcription factors have also been found to be regulated by proteasomal degradation mechanisms. In Chinese grapevine (Vitis pseudoreticulata) ERYSIPHE NECATOR-INDUCED RING FINGER PROTEIN1 targets WRKY11 for degradation leading to enhanced powdery mildew resistance. In rice, WRKY45 is degraded by the proteasome although the E3 ubiquitin ligase responsible remains unknown
