= Homeobox protein Nkx-2.5 =

Protein-coding gene in humans

NKX2-5

Identifiers
- Aliases: NKX2-5, CHNG5, CSX, CSX1, HLHS2, NKX2.5, NKX2E, NKX4-1, VSD3, NK2 homeobox 5
- External IDs: OMIM: 600584; MGI: 97350; GeneCards: NKX2-5
Available structures
| PDB | Ortholog search: PDBe RCSB |
| PDB | List of PDB id codes 3RKQ, 4S0H |

Gene location (Human)
| Chr. | Chromosome 5 (human) |
| Band | 5q35.1 | Start | 173,232,109 bp |
| Band | 5q35.1 | End | 173,235,311 bp |

Gene location (Mouse)
| Chr. | Chromosome 17 (mouse) |
| Band | 17 A3.3|17 13.6 cM | Start | 27,057,638 bp |
| Band | 17 A3.3|17 13.6 cM | End | 27,063,983 bp |
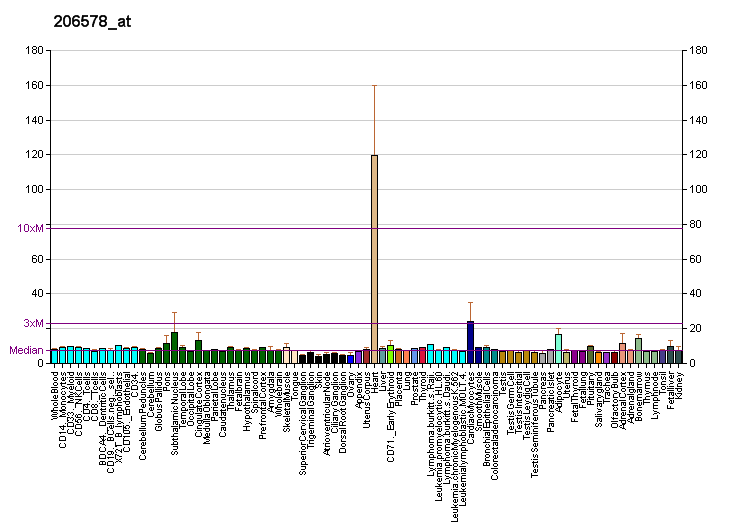
RNA expression pattern
| Bgee | Human / Mouse (ortholog); Top expressed in: apex of heart; right auricle of heart; left ventricle; right ventricle; myocardium of left ventricle; cardiac muscle tissue of right atrium; spleen; gonad; vena cava; body of tongue / Top expressed in: atrium; interventricular septum; right ventricle; myocardium of atrium; myocardium of ventricle; cardiac muscles; endocardial cushion; Cardiac muscle tissue of myocardium; cardiac muscle tissue of left ventricle; tongue muscle; More reference expression data |
| BioGPS | More reference expression data |
Gene ontology
| Molecular function | DNA-binding transcription factor activity; DNA-binding transcription activator activity, RNA polymerase II-specific; transcription factor binding; protein homodimerization activity; serum response element binding; chromatin binding; protein binding; DNA binding; sequence-specific DNA binding; transcription coregulator activity; protein heterodimerization activity; transcription factor activity, RNA polymerase II distal enhancer sequence-specific binding; RNA polymerase II cis-regulatory region sequence-specific DNA binding; DNA-binding transcription factor activity, RNA polymerase II-specific |
| Cellular component | cytoplasm; nucleus; transcription regulator complex; RNA polymerase II transcription regulator complex; protein-containing complex; protein-DNA complex |
| Biological process | cardiac conduction system development; apoptotic process involved in heart morphogenesis; bundle of His development; regulation of transcription by RNA polymerase II; atrioventricular node cell development; outflow tract morphogenesis; embryonic heart tube development; vasculogenesis; heart looping; atrial septum morphogenesis; positive regulation of heart contraction; proepicardium development; pulmonary myocardium development; heart contraction; ventricular cardiac muscle cell development; negative regulation of canonical Wnt signaling pathway; pharyngeal system development; atrioventricular node development; cardiac ventricle formation; regulation of transcription, DNA-templated; cardiac muscle contraction; regulation of cardiac muscle cell proliferation; heart trabecula formation; ventricular septum morphogenesis; cardiac muscle cell differentiation; Purkinje myocyte differentiation; spleen development; positive regulation of transcription, DNA-templated; development of the heart; positive regulation of neuron differentiation; positive regulation of cardioblast differentiation; septum secundum development; atrial cardiac muscle cell development; cell differentiation; adult heart development; right ventricular cardiac muscle tissue morphogenesis; negative regulation of apoptotic process; negative regulation of transcription by RNA polymerase II; positive regulation of transcription initiation from RNA polymerase II promoter; cardiac muscle cell proliferation; BMP signaling pathway; ventricular trabecula myocardium morphogenesis; outflow tract septum morphogenesis; negative regulation of cardiac muscle cell apoptotic process; thyroid gland development; canonical Wnt signaling pathway; negative regulation of transcription, DNA-templated; sarcomere organization; cardiac ventricle morphogenesis; regulation of cardiac conduction; cardiac muscle tissue development; embryonic heart tube left/right pattern formation; heart morphogenesis; cardiac muscle tissue morphogenesis; multicellular organism development; positive regulation of gene expression; positive regulation of cell population proliferation; positive regulation of sodium ion transport; negative regulation of myotube differentiation; regulation of cardiac muscle contraction; ventricular cardiac myofibril assembly; atrioventricular node cell fate commitment; positive regulation of transcription by RNA polymerase II; transcription by RNA polymerase II; hemopoiesis |
Sources:Amigo / QuickGO
Orthologs
| Databases | NCBI: entry; OMA: entry |
| Species | Human | Mouse |
| Entrez | 1482 | 18091 |
| Ensembl | ENSG00000183072 | ENSMUSG00000015579 |
| UniProt | P52952 | P42582 |
| RefSeq (mRNA) | NM_004387; NM_001166175; NM_001166176 | NM_008700 |
| RefSeq (protein) | NP_001159647; NP_001159648; NP_004378 | NP_032726 |
| Location (UCSC) | Chr 5: 173.23 – 173.24 Mb | Chr 17: 27.06 – 27.06 Mb |
| PubMed search |
- Wikidata
| View/Edit Human | View/Edit Mouse |

Homeobox protein Nkx-2.5 is a protein that in humans is encoded by the NKX2-5 gene.

== Function ==
Homeobox-containing genes play critical roles in regulating tissue-specific gene expression essential for tissue differentiation, as well as determining the temporal and spatial patterns of development (Shiojima et al., 1995). It has been demonstrated that a Drosophila homeobox-containing gene called 'tinman' is expressed in the developing dorsal vessel and in the equivalent of the vertebrate heart. Mutations in tinman result in loss of heart formation in the embryo, suggesting that tinman is essential for Drosophila heart formation. Furthermore, abundant expression of Csx, the presumptive mouse homolog of tinman, is observed only in the heart from the time of cardiac differentiation. CSX, the human homolog of murine Csx, has a homeodomain sequence identical to that of Csx and is expressed only in the heart, again suggesting that CSX plays an important role in human heart formation. In humans, proper NKX2-5 expression is essential for the development of atrial, ventricular, and conotruncal septation, atrioventricular (AV) valve formation, and maintenance of AV conduction. Mutations in expression are associated with congenital heart disease (CHD) and related ailments. Patients with NKX2-5 mutations commonly present AV conduction block and atrial septal defects (ASD). Recently, postnatal roles of cardiac transcription factors have been extensively investigated. Consistent with the direct transactivation of numerous cardiac genes reactivated in response to hypertrophic stimulation, cardiac transcription factors are profoundly involved in the generation of cardiac hypertrophy or in cardioprotection from cytotoxic stress in the adult heart. The NKX2-5 transcription factor may help myocytes endure cytotoxic stress, however further exploration in this field is required.

NK-2 homeobox genes are a family of genes that encode for numerous transcription factors that go on to aid in the development of many structures including the thyroid, colon, and heart. Of the NK-2 genes, NKX2-5 transcription factor is mostly involved in cardiac development and defects with this gene can lead to congenital heart defects including, but not limited to atrial septal defects. NKX2-5 is expressed in precursor cardiac cells and this expression is necessary in order to lead to proper cardiac development. In NKX2-5 gene knock out mice, subjects were found to have induced congenital heart defects by leading to differentially expressed genes. In the case of loss of function of NKX2-5, test subjects developed increased heart rate and decreased variability in heart rate. This discovery indicates that NKX2-5 is necessary for proper cardiac formatting as well as proper cardiac function after formatting. NKX2-5 has also been shown to bind to the promoter of FGF-16 and regulate its expression. This finding suggests that NKX2-5 is implicated in cardiac injury via cytotoxic effects.

== Interactions ==
During embryogenesis, NKX2-5 is expressed in early cardiac mesoderm cells throughout the left ventricle and atrial chambers. In early cardiogenesis, cardiac precursor cells from the cardiac crescent congregate along the ventral midline of the developing embryo and form the linear heart tube. In Nkx2-5 knock out mice, cardiac development halts at the linear heart tube stage and looping morphogenesis disrupted.

NKX2-5 has been shown to interact with GATA4 and TBX5. NKX2-5 is a transcription factor that regulates heart development from the Cardiac Crescent of the splanchnic mesoderm in humans. NKX2-5 is dependent upon the JAK-STAT pathway and works along with MEF2, HAND1, and HAND2 transcription factors to direct heart looping during early heart development. NKX2-5 in vertebrates is equivalent to the ‘tinman’ gene in Drosophila and directly activates the MEF2 gene to control cardiomyocyte differentiation. NKX2-5 operates in a positive feedback loop with GATA transcription factors to regulate cardiomyocyte formation. NKX2-5 influences HAND1 and HAND2 transcription factors that control the essential asymmetrical development of the heart's ventricles. The gene has been shown to play a role in the heart's conduction system, postnatally. NKX2-5 is also involved in the intrinsic mechanisms that decide ventricle and atrial cellular fate. During ventricular chamber formation, NKX2-5 and NKX2-7 are required to maintain cardiomyocyte cellular identity. Repression of either gene results in the differentiating cardiomyocytes to move towards atrial chamber identity. The NKX2-5 mutation has also been associated with preeclampsia; though research is still being conducting in this area.
