= TBX2 =

Protein-coding gene in the species Homo sapiens

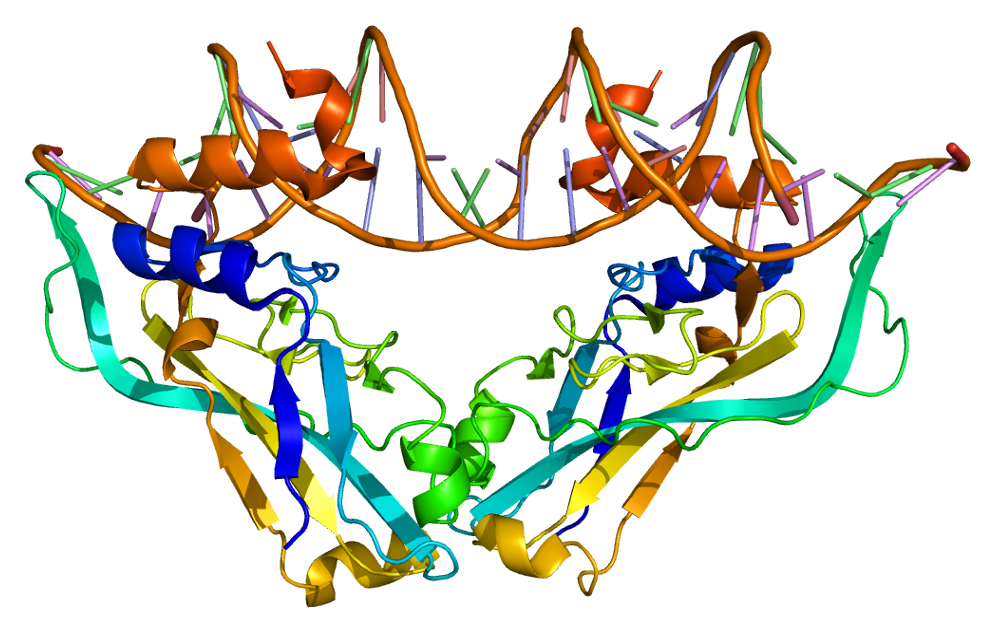

Identifiers
- Aliases: TBX2, T-box 2, VETD, T-box transcription factor 2
- External IDs: OMIM: 600747; MGI: 98494; GeneCards: TBX2

Gene location (Human)
Chr.	Chromosome 17 (human)
Band	17q23.2	Start	61,399,843 bp
Band	17q23.2	End	61,409,466 bp

Gene location (Mouse)
Chr.	Chromosome 11 (mouse)
Band	11 C|11 51.34 cM	Start	85,723,377 bp
Band	11 C|11 51.34 cM	End	85,732,774 bp
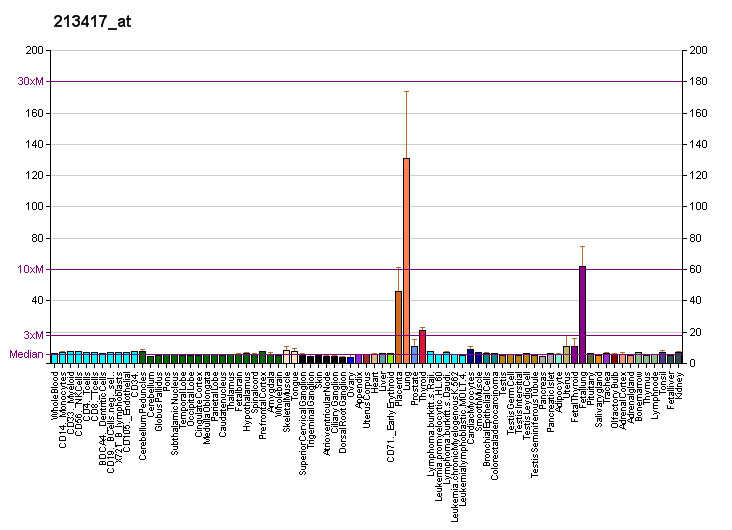

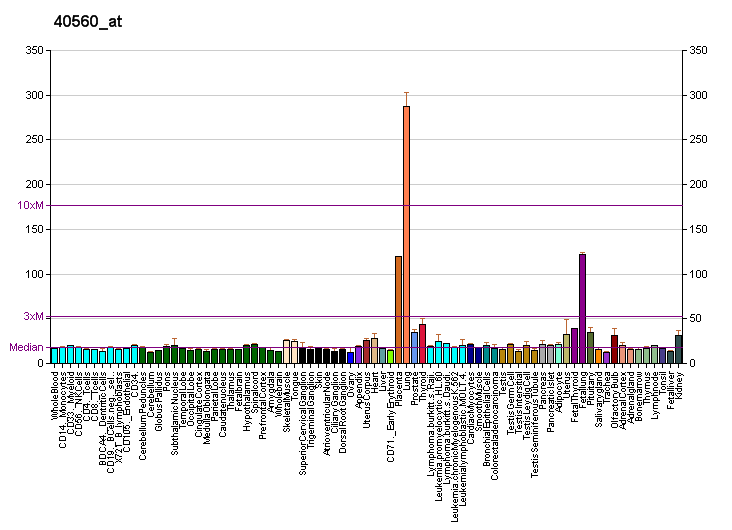

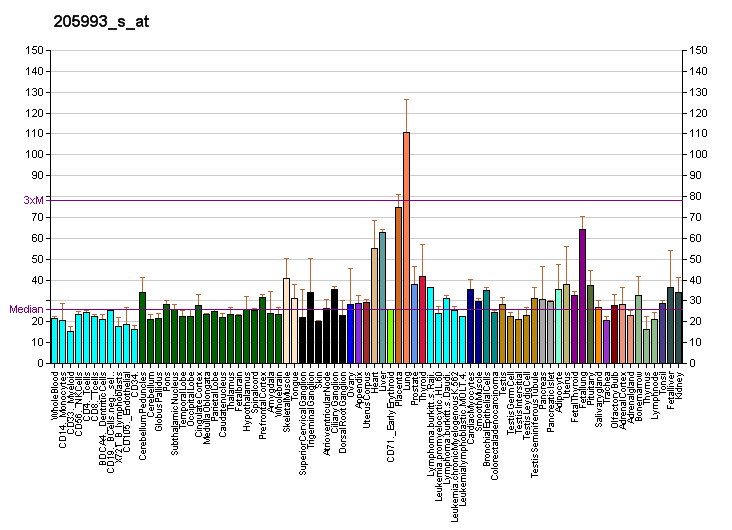
RNA expression pattern
Bgee	Human / Mouse (ortholog); Top expressed in: right lung; right coronary artery; upper lobe of left lung; right uterine tube; left coronary artery; seminal vesicula; tibial arteries; apex of heart; periodontal fiber; caput epididymis / Top expressed in: transitional epithelium of ureter; lumbar spinal ganglion; left lung lobe; transitional epithelium of urinary bladder; atrioventricular canal; maxillary prominence; vestibular membrane of cochlear duct; Gonadal ridge; right lung; medullary collecting duct; More reference expression data
BioGPS	More reference expression data
Gene ontology
Molecular function	DNA binding; sequence-specific DNA binding; DNA-binding transcription factor activity; RNA polymerase II cis-regulatory region sequence-specific DNA binding; DNA-binding transcription repressor activity, RNA polymerase II-specific; protein binding; DNA-binding transcription factor activity, RNA polymerase II-specific
Cellular component	transcription regulator complex; nucleus
Biological process	Notch signaling pathway; roof of mouth development; atrioventricular canal development; pharynx development; regulation of transcription, DNA-templated; regulation of heart contraction; cardiac muscle tissue development; negative regulation of heart looping; mammary placode formation; embryonic digit morphogenesis; heart morphogenesis; outflow tract morphogenesis; negative regulation of transcription by RNA polymerase II; aorta morphogenesis; transcription, DNA-templated; embryonic heart tube development; outflow tract septum morphogenesis; endocardial cushion morphogenesis; multicellular organism development; heart looping; muscle cell fate determination; cellular senescence; developmental growth involved in morphogenesis; positive regulation of cardiac muscle cell proliferation; embryonic camera-type eye morphogenesis; positive regulation of cell population proliferation; negative regulation of cardiac chamber formation; negative regulation of transcription, DNA-templated
Sources:Amigo / QuickGO
Orthologs
Databases	NCBI: entry; OMA: entry
Species	Human	Mouse
Entrez	6909	21385
Ensembl	ENSG00000121068	ENSMUSG00000000093
UniProt	Q13207	Q60707
RefSeq (mRNA)	NM_005994	NM_009324
RefSeq (protein)	NP_005985	NP_033350
Location (UCSC)	Chr 17: 61.4 – 61.41 Mb	Chr 11: 85.72 – 85.73 Mb
PubMed search
- Wikidata
View/Edit Human	View/Edit Mouse

T-box transcription factor 2 Tbx2 is a transcription factor that is encoded by the Tbx2 gene on chromosome 17q21-22 in humans. This gene is a member of a phylogenetically conserved family of genes that share a common DNA-binding domain, the T-box. Tbx2 and Tbx3 are the only T-box transcription factors that act as transcriptional repressors rather than transcriptional activators, and are closely related in terms of development and tumorigenesis. This gene plays a significant role in embryonic and fetal development through control of gene expression, and also has implications in various cancers. Tbx2 is associated with numerous signaling pathways, BMP, TGFβ, Wnt, and FGF, which allow for patterning and proliferation during organogenesis in fetal development.

== Role in development ==
The molecule Tbx-2 is a transcription factor in the T box transcription factor family. Tbx2 helps form the outflow tract and atrioventricular canal. Tbx2 can repress genes as well as being competitors that take over binding sites. It also plays a role in cancer because it will suppress cell growth and supports invasiveness. In human melanoma, the expression of endogenous Tbx 2 is shown to help reduce the growth of melanomas. It has also been shown that overexpression of Tbx2 can lead to breast cancer. Tbx2 has shown septal defects of the outflow tract, and this has been shown using a knockout mouse. The knockout mouse is a mouse in which the gene is inactivated in order to study the role of genes. Tbx 2 also helps in regulating the cell cycle. This was first shown when Tbx2 was found in a chromosomal region that is often mutated in ovarian cancer and pancreatic cancer cells.

During fetal development, the relationship of Tbx2 to FGF, BMP, and Wnt signaling pathways indicates its extensive control in development of various organ systems. It functions predominantly in the patterning of organ development rather than tissue proliferation. Tbx2 has implications in limb development, atrioventricular development of the heart, and development of the anterior brain tissues.

During limb bud development, Shh and FGF signaling stimulate the outgrowth of the limb. At a certain point, Tbx2 concentrations are such that the signaling of Shh and FGF are terminated, halting further progression and outgrowth of the limb development. This occurs directly through Tbx2 repressing the expression of Grem1, creating a negative Grem1 zone, thereby disrupting the outgrowth signaling by Shh and FGF.

Cardiac development is heavily regulated and requires the development of the four cardiac chambers, septum, and various valve components for outflow and inflow. In heart development, Tbx2 is up-regulated by BMP2 to stimulate atrioventricular development. The development of a Tbx2 knockout mouse model allowed for the determination of specific roles of Tbx2 in cardiac development, and scientists determined Tbx2 and Tbx3 to be redundant in much of heart development. Further, the use of these knockout models determined the significance of Tbx2 in the BMP signaling pathway for development of the atrioventricular canal, atrioventricular nodal phenotype, and atrioventricular cushion.

The atrioventricular canal signaling cascade involves the atrial natriuretic factor gene (ANF). This gene is one of the first hallmarks of chamber formation in the developing myocardium. A small fragment within this gene can repress the promoter of cardiac troponin I (cTnI) selectively in the atrioventricular canal. T-box factor and NK2-homeobox factor binding element are involved in the repression of the atrioventricular canal without affecting its chamber activity. Tbx2 forms a complex with Nkx2.5 on the ANF gene to repress its promoter activity, so that the gene's expression is inhibited in the atrioventricular canal during chamber differentiation. The atrioventricular canal is also the origin of the atrioventricular nodal axis and helps eventually coordinate the beating heart. The role of Tbx2 in cushion formation in the developing heart is by working with Tbx3 to trigger a feed-forward loop with BMP2 for the coordinated development of these cushions. Tbx2 has also been found to temporally suppress the proliferation and differentiation a subset of the primary myocardial cells.

Finally, during anterior brain development, BMP stimulates the expression of Tbx2, which suppresses FGF signaling. This suppression of FGF signaling further represses the expression of Flrt3, which is necessary for anterior brain development.

Tbx2 has been shown to be a master regulator in the differentiation of inner and outer hair cells.

== Associated congenital defects ==
It is known that Tbx2 functions in a dose-dependent manner; therefore, duplication or deletion of the region encompassing Tbx2 can cause various congenital defects, including: microcephaly, various ventricular-septal defects, and skeletal abnormalities. Some specific abnormalities are discussed further below. Mutations in TBX2 cause predisposition to hernias.

=== Abnormalities of the digits ===
During limb bud development, down-regulation of Tbx2 fails to inhibit Shh/FGF4 signaling; therefore, resulting in increased limb bud size and duplication of the 4th digit, polydactyly. Opposite this, when Tbx2 is over expressed or duplicated, limb buds are smaller and can have reduced digit number because of the early termination of Shh and FGF4 signaling.

=== Ventricular septal defects ===
This is a broad category encompassing many more specific congenital heart defects. Of those related to Tbx2, some are caused by duplication, or over expression, of Tbx2, and others are caused by deletion of the Tbx2 gene region. For example, patients with a duplication of the Tbx2 gene region have presented with atrioventricular abnormalities including: interventricular septal defect, patent foramen ovale, aortic coarctation, tricuspid valve insufficiency, and mitral valve stenosis. Contrary, those with Tbx2 gene deletion have presented with pulmonary hypertension and other heart defects, but is less reported.

== Role in tumorigenesis ==
Tbx2 has been implicated in cancers associated with the lung, breast, bone, pancreas, and melanoma. It is known to be over-expressed in this group of cancers, altering cell-signaling pathways leading to tumorigenesis. Several pathways have been suggested and studied using mouse knockout models of genes within the signaling pathways. Currently, research using the knockout model of Tbx2 for study of tumorigenesis is limited.

p14ARF/MDM2/p35/p21^{CIP1} Pathway. When up-regulated, Tbx2 inhibits p21^{CIP1}^{.} p21^{CIP1} is necessary for tissue senescence, and when compromised, leaves the tissue vulnerable to tumor-promoting signals.

Wnt/beta-catenin Pathway. The role of Tbx2 in Wnt signaling has yet to be confirmed; however, up-regulation of Tbx2 in the beta-catenin signaling pathway leads to loss of the adhesion molecule E-cadherin. This returns cells to a mesenchymal state, and facilitates invasion of tumor cells.

EGR1 Signaling Pathway. Finally, Tbx2 up-regulation increases its interaction with EGR1. EGR1 represses NDGR1 to increase cell proliferation, resulting in metastasis or tumor development.

Together, the up-regulation of Tbx2 on these signaling pathways can lead to development of malignant tumors.

== Cancer treatment target ==
Understanding the signaling pathways, and the role of Tbx2 in tumorigenesis, can aid in developing gene-targeted cancer treatments. Because Tbx2 is up-regulated in various types of cancer cells in multiple organ systems, the potential for gene therapy is optimistic. Scientists are interested in targeting a small domain of Tbx2 and Tbx3 to reduce its expression, and utilize small peptides known to suppress tumor genes to inhibit proliferation. An in vitro study using a cell line of human prostate cancer blocked endogenous Tbx2 using Tbx2 dominant-negative retroviral vectors found reduced tumor cell proliferation. Further, the same study suggests targeting WNT3A because of its role in cell-signaling with Tbx2, by utilizing a WNT antagonist such as SFRP-2. Because somatic cells have low expression of Tbx2, a targeted Tbx2 gene treatment would leave healthy somatic cells unharmed, thereby providing a treatment with low toxicity and negative side effects. Much research is still required to determine the efficacy of these specific gene targets to anti-cancer treatments.
