= TBX6 =

Protein-coding gene in the species Homo sapiens

Identifiers
- Aliases: TBX6, SCDO5, T-box 6, T-box transcription factor 6
- External IDs: OMIM: 602427; MGI: 102539; GeneCards: TBX6

Gene location (Human)
Chr.	Chromosome 16 (human)
Band	16p11.2	Start	30,085,793 bp
Band	16p11.2	End	30,091,924 bp

Gene location (Mouse)
Chr.	Chromosome 7 (mouse)
Band	7 F3|7 69.25 cM	Start	126,380,655 bp
Band	7 F3|7 69.25 cM	End	126,384,732 bp
RNA expression pattern
Bgee	Human / Mouse (ortholog); Top expressed in: buccal mucosa cell; pancreatic ductal cell; olfactory zone of nasal mucosa; vagina; deltoid muscle; tibialis anterior muscle; mucosa of ileum; body of pancreas; granulocyte; skin of abdomen / Top expressed in: tail of embryo; paraxial mesoderm; granulocyte; primitive streak; female urethra; embryo; male urethra; mesoderm; Ileal epithelium; embryo; More reference expression data
BioGPS	n/a
Gene ontology
Molecular function	DNA-binding transcription factor activity; DNA binding; protein binding; RNA polymerase II cis-regulatory region sequence-specific DNA binding; DNA-binding transcription factor activity, RNA polymerase II-specific
Cellular component	nucleus
Biological process	cell fate specification; multicellular organism development; somite rostral/caudal axis specification; mesoderm formation; anatomical structure morphogenesis; negative regulation of neuron maturation; mesoderm development; signal transduction involved in regulation of gene expression; negative regulation of neuron projection development; regulation of transcription, DNA-templated; negative regulation of transcription by RNA polymerase II; transcription, DNA-templated; positive regulation of transcription by RNA polymerase II; negative regulation of DNA-binding transcription factor activity
Sources:Amigo / QuickGO
Orthologs
Databases	NCBI: entry; OMA: entry
Species	Human	Mouse
Entrez	6911	21389
Ensembl	ENSG00000149922	ENSMUSG00000030699
UniProt	O95947	P70327
RefSeq (mRNA)	NM_004608; NM_080758	NM_011538
RefSeq (protein)	NP_004599	NP_035668
Location (UCSC)	Chr 16: 30.09 – 30.09 Mb	Chr 7: 126.38 – 126.38 Mb
PubMed search
- Wikidata
View/Edit Human	View/Edit Mouse

T-box 6 is a protein that in humans is encoded by the TBX6 gene.

== Function ==
This gene is a member of a phylogenetically conserved family of genes that share a common DNA-binding domain, the T-box. T-box genes encode transcription factors involved in the regulation of developmental processes. Knockout studies in mice indicate that this gene is important for specification of paraxial mesoderm structures.

Tbx6 is also required for the segmentation of the paraxial mesoderm into somites, and for the normal development of the dermomyotome in zebrafish. In the absence of Tbx6, the central dermomyotome of zebrafish fails to develop.

Tbx6 functions in a gene regulatory network with mesp-b and ripply1.
