= WRKY protein domain =

Protein domain

WRKY
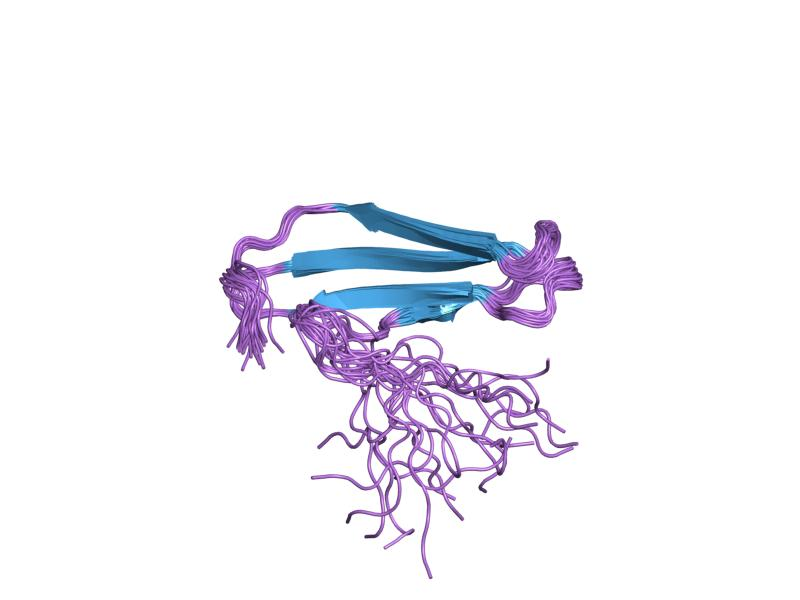
- solution structure of the c-terminal wrky domain of atwrky4

Identifiers
- Symbol: WRKY
- Pfam: PF03106
- Pfam clan: CL0274
- InterPro: IPR003657
Available protein structures:
- PDB: IPR003657 PF03106 (ECOD; PDBsum)
- AlphaFold: IPR003657; PF03106

The WRKY domain is found in the WRKY transcription factor family, a class of transcription factors. The WRKY domain is found almost exclusively in plants although WRKY genes appear present in some diplomonads, social amoebae and other amoebozoa, and fungi incertae sedis. They appear absent in other non-plant species. WRKY transcription factors have been a significant area of plant research for the past 20 years. The WRKY DNA-binding domain recognizes the W-box (T)TGAC(C/T) (and variants of this sequence) cis-regulatory element.

== Structure ==
WRKY transcription factors contain either one or two WRKY protein domains. The WRKY protein domain is 60 to 70 amino acids long type of DNA binding domain. The domain is characterized by a highly conserved core WRKYGQK motif and a zinc finger region. The cysteine and histidine zinc finger domain occurs as a CX_{4-5}CX_{22-23}HXH or CX_{7}CX_{23}HXC type, where X can be any amino acid. The zinc finger binds a Zn^{+2} ion, which is required for protein function. While the WRKYGQK is highly conserved in most WRKY domains, variation in the core sequence has been documented. A frequently occurring variant of the core sequence is WRKYGKK, which is present in most plant species.

The structure of the WRKY protein domain was first determined in 2005 using nuclear magnetic resonance (NMR) and later by crystallography. The WRKY protein domain is a globular shape composed of five anti-parallel β-strands. The core WRKYGQK motif is found on the second β-strand. Eighteen amino acids are highly conserved in the WRKY protein domain, including the core motif, zinc-finger binding cysteines and histidines, and a triad forming a DWK salt bridge. The triad consist of a conserved tryptophan (W) of the core motif, along with an aspartic acid (D) four amino acids upstream and a lysine (K) 29 amino acids downstream of it, stabilizing the entire domain. Five amino acids on the third β-strand (PRSYY) are also well conserved in the WRKY domain. Importantly, the WRKY genes contain a conserved intron in the WRKY domain, which occurs at the location encoding for the PR of the PRSYY amino acid sequence, thus explaining the conservation of this motif.

== WRKY-DNA Interaction ==
The WRKY domain forms a unique wedge-shaped structure that enters perpendicularly in the major groove of the DNA strand. WRKY protein domains interact with the (T/A)TGAC(T/A) cis-element, also called the W-box. Recent evidence suggests that the GAC core of the W-box is the primary target of the WRKY domain and flanking sequences help dictate DNA interaction with very specific WRKY proteins. The RKYGQK residues of the core motif and additional arginine and lysine residues of the WRKY domain are responsible for interaction with the phosphate backbone of seven consecutive DNA base pairs, including the GAC core. Changing the tryptophan, tyrosine, or either lysine of the WRKYGQK motif to alanine completely abolishes DNA-binding, indicating these amino acids are essential for recognizing the W-box element. While not essential, altering the WRKYGQK motif arginine, glycine or glutamine to alanine reduces DNA-binding to the W-box. Overall, these complex WRKY protein domain-DNA interactions results in gene activation necessary for numerous aspects of plant development and defense.
