= T-box =

Genes that affect limb and heart development

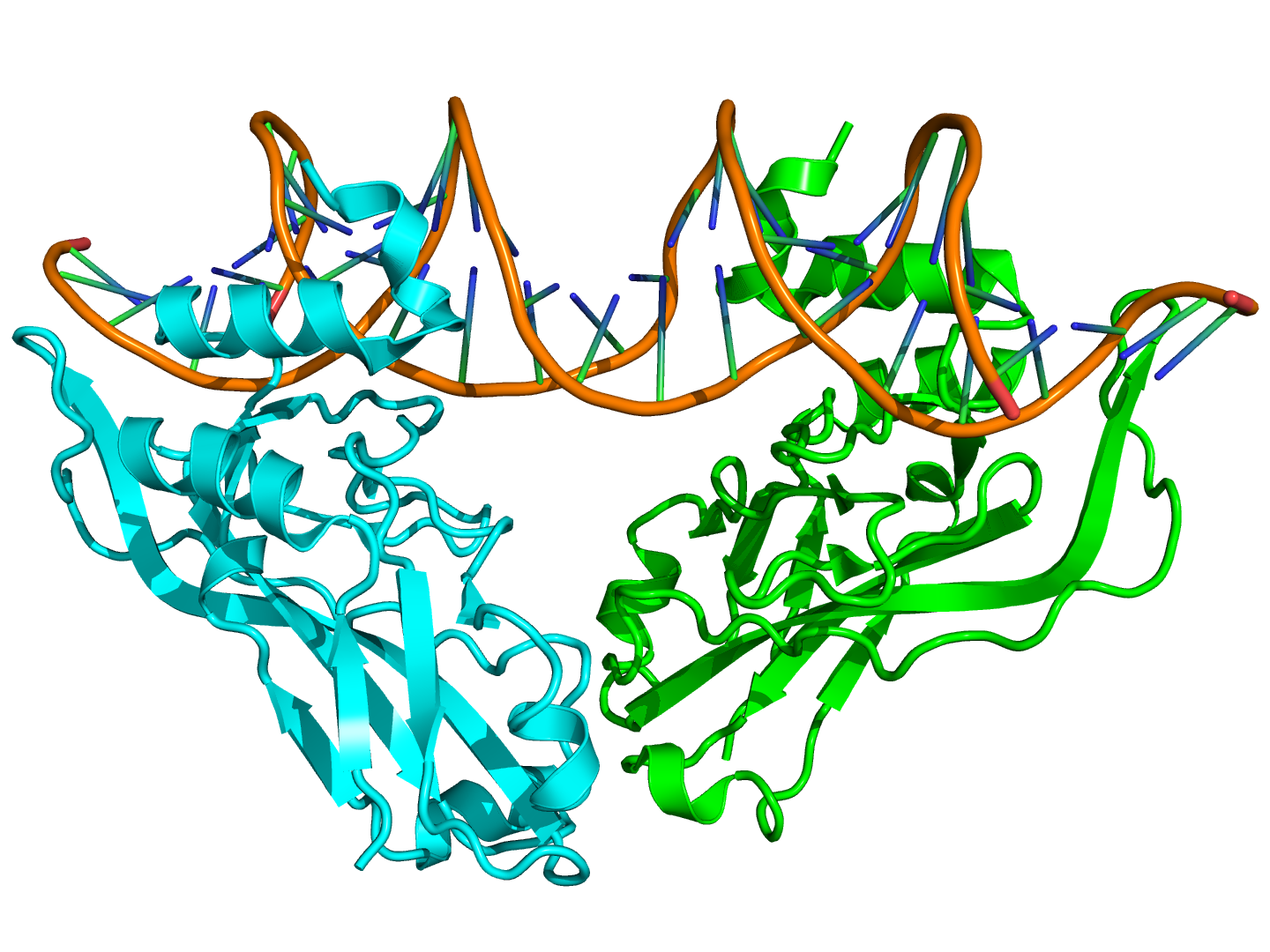
- Crystallographic structure of the TBX3 protein dimer (cyan and green) complexed with DNA (brown) based on the PDB: 1h6f coordinates.

Identifiers
- Symbol: T-box
- Pfam: PF00907
- InterPro: IPR001699
- PROSITE: PS50252
- SCOP2: 1xbr / SCOPe / SUPFAM
Available protein structures:
- PDB: 1h6f, 1xbr IPR001699 PF00907 (ECOD; PDBsum)
- AlphaFold: IPR001699; PF00907

T-box refers to a group of transcription factors involved in embryonic limb and heart development. Every T-box protein has a relatively large DNA-binding domain, generally comprising about a third of the entire protein that is both necessary and sufficient for sequence-specific DNA binding. All members of the T-box gene family bind to the "T-box", a DNA consensus sequence of TCACACCT.

== Members ==
T-boxes are especially important to the development of embryos, found in zebrafish oocyte by Bruce et al 2003 and Xenopus laevis oocyte by Xanthos et al 2001. They are also expressed in later stages, including adult mouse and rabbit studied by Szabo et al 2000.

Mutations in the first one found caused short tails in mice, and thus the protein encoded was named brachyury, Greek for "short-tail". In mice this gene is named Tbxt, and in humans it is named TBXT. Brachyury has been found in all bilaterian animals that have been screened, and is also present in the cnidaria.

The mouse Tbxt gene was cloned and found to be a 436 amino acid embryonic nuclear transcription factor. The protein brachyury binds to the T-box through a region at its N-terminus.

== Protein activity ==
The encoded proteins of TBX5 and TBX4 play a role in limb development, and play a major role in limb bud initiation specifically. For instance, in chickens TBX4 specifies hindlimb status while Tbx5 specifies forelimb status. The activation of these proteins by Hox genes initiates signaling cascades that involve the Wnt signaling pathway and FGF signals in limb buds. Ultimately, TBX4 and TBX5 lead to the development of apical ectodermal ridge (AER) and zone of polarizing activity (ZPA) signaling centers in the developing limb bud, which specify the orientation growth of the developing limb. Together, TBX5 and TBX4 play a role in patterning the soft tissues (muscles and tendons) of the musculoskeletal system.

== Defects ==
In humans, and some other animals, defects in the TBX5 gene expression are responsible for Holt–Oram syndrome, which is characterized by at least one abnormal wrist bone. Other arm bones are almost always affected, though the severity can vary widely, from complete absence of a bone, to only a reduction in bone length. Seventy-five percent of affected individuals also have heart defects, most often there is no separation between the left and right ventricle of the heart.

TBX3 is associated with ulnar–mammary syndrome in humans, but is also responsible for the presence or absence of dun color in horses, and has no deleterious effects whether expressed or not.

== T-box genes ==
Genes encoding T-box proteins include:

- TBXT (TBXT) the first found (in mice)
- TBR1 (TBR1)
- TBX1 (TBX1)
- TBX2 (TBX2)
- TBX3 (TBX3)
- TBX4 (TBX4)
- TBX5 (TBX5)
- TBX6 (TBX6)
- TBX10 (TBX10)
- TBX15 (TBX15)
- TBX18 (TBX18)
- TBX19 (TBX19)
- TBX20 (TBX20)
- TBX21 (TBX21)
- TBX22 (TBX22)

== See also ==
- Brachyury
- Homeobox
- Development genes in plants: G-box, I-box, W-box, Z-box
