= Ischiopatellar dysplasia =

- Ischiopatellar dysplasia is inherited in an autosomal dominant manner

Ischiopatellar dysplasia is a rare autosomal dominant disorder characterized by a hypoplasia of the patellae as well as other bone anomalies, especially concerning the pelvis and feet. It is also known as small patella syndrome, with earlier synonyms being Scott-Taor syndrome, Coxo-podo-patellar syndrome, Patella aplasia, coxa vara, tarsal synostosis, Congenital coxa vara, patella aplasia and tarsal synostosis ischiocoxopodopatellar syndrome.

== Signs and symptoms ==
Individuals affected by ischiopatellar dysplasia commonly have abnormalities of the patella and pelvic girdle, such as absent or delayed patellar and ischial ossification as well as infra-acetabular axe-cut notches. Patellae are typically absent or small in these individuals, when patellae are present they are small and laterally displaced or dislocated. In addition, abnormalities in other parts of their skeleton and dysmorphic features are common in those affected. Other features that have been identified in patients with ischiopatellar dysplasia include foot anomalies, specifically flat feet (pes planus), syndactylism of the toes, short fourth and fifth toes, and a large gap between the first and second toes, femur anomalies, cleft palate, and craniofacial dysmorphisms.

Ischiopubic junction ossification can be absent, delayed, or abnormal. Other findings include hallux varus, brachymetatarsia affecting the fourth and fifth metatarsals, flat feet, and the presence of an elongated medial patellofemoral ligament. Less common findings include micrognathia, cleft palate, frontal bossing and nose prominence. Complications include infancy-onset recurrence of luxations, pain of the knee, impaired ability of running and riding bicycles, and late-onset gonarthrosis, although it is not uncommon for some cases to be asymptomatic.

== Causes ==
Ischiopatellar dysplasia is often considered a familial condition. Ischiopatellar dysplasia has been identified on region 5.6 cM on chromosome 17q22. Mutations in the TBX4 (T-box protein 4) gene, in chromosome 17, have been found to cause ischiopatellar dysplasia due to the essential role TBX4 plays in lower limb development since TBX4 is a transcription factor.

== Diagnosis ==
Ischiopatellar dysplasia is usually identified through radiographic evidence since its characteristic changes are most notable in radiographic tests that indicate delayed bone age or absent ossification. A full skeletal survey should be performed on any patient that has an absent or hypoplastic patellae since they could potentially have ischiopatellar dysplasia. Magnetic resonance imaging (MRI) is especially helpful in the diagnosis of ischiopatellar syndrome and is recommended when an individual affected by ischiopatellar dysplasia has a traumatic injury to the knee.

Around 50-70 cases have been described in medical literature. Diagnosis is made through genetic testing and radiography.

== History ==
Ischiopatellar dysplasia is sometimes referred to as Scott-Taor syndrome after the researchers who first described ischiopatellar dysplasia as they recognized it in a family as an autosomal dominant disorder in 1979. This finding was important as they were the first to note that it was a benign disorder that is separate from the more severe nail-patella syndrome. Other common names for ischiopatellar syndrome are small patella syndrome (SPS), since the patellae are often small or absent in patients who have this syndrome, and coxo-podo-patellaire syndrome.
