= Acheiropodia =

- Other names: Horn-Kolb syndrome, acheiropody and aleijadinhos (Brazilian type)
- Acheiropodia has an autosomal recessive pattern of inheritance
- Specialty: Medical genetics

Acheiropodia, also known as Horn Kolb syndrome, is a genetic condition that affects limb development, resulting in shortened arms and legs and absent hands and feet on both sides of the body at birth. Specifically, individuals are born missing the epiphysis typically found at the end of the humerus bone of the upper arm, the diaphysis which makes up the long section of the tibia bone of the shin, the radius and ulna bones which make up the lower arm, the fibula bone of the shin, and all hand and foot bones. It was first discovered and is prevalent almost exclusively in Brazil.

== Discovery and prevalence ==
Acheiropodia was first described in Brazil in 1929 and the variations in expression (the range in severity and type of signs and symptoms experienced by patients), namely the presence or absence of digits on upper limbs or the Bohomeletz bone (a small, elongated bone located at the upper limb tips, parallel to the humerus and suggested to be what would have developed into the ulna), were further documented in 1930. It was noted that the presence of one or more digits on upper limbs was consistently associated with the absence of the Bohomeletz bone, and when the Bohomeletz bone was attached, digits were absent from the residual limbs. Acheiropodia cases have been described in Turkey, Argentina, Ireland, and the United States. It was estimated that there were 3 cases of acheiropodia for every 10 million people.

== Genetics ==
Acheiropodia results from a change in the DNA sequence of the C7orf2 gene. Genes code for proteins. When this altered gene is copied for its protein instructions, the resulting instructions are processed differently from the unaltered instructions. This effectively cuts out one of the protein-coding segments called exon 4, which is needed for the final protein. The absence of this segment causes the reading of protein instructions to stop prematurely. This leads to a shorter, non-functional protein.

The C7orf2 gene is the human equivalent of the mouse gene LMBR1, which encodes an essential protein for limb development. When there is no functional protein present, limb development does not occur correctly, and individuals are born with acheiropodia. However, all individuals have two sets of chromosomes and thus two copies of the C7orf2 gene. The non-functional protein resulting from one altered gene does not interfere with the functional copy of the protein, so acheiropodia only occurs in those who have this rare change in both copies of C7orf2. This makes it an autosomal-recessive condition, meaning that individuals will only be affected by acheiropodia if both parents carry one copy of the altered gene without experiencing symptoms, resulting in the inheritance of one acheiropodia gene copy from each parent.

The rare variant in C7rof2 results in the processed RNA transcript missing exon 4. As a result, the conversion from RNA to protein is halted early, resulting in a short, nonfunctional protein. Two mutated copies of the gene, leading to two nonfunctional proteins, are required for acheiropodia to develop.

The C7orf2 DNA sequence is very stable and changes occur rarely, partly explaining the rarity of this condition. Since the rare gene copy is unlikely to be found in parents from two unrelated families, acheiropodia is often caused by consanguineous marriages in which genetically related individuals have children together.

== Molecular mechanism ==
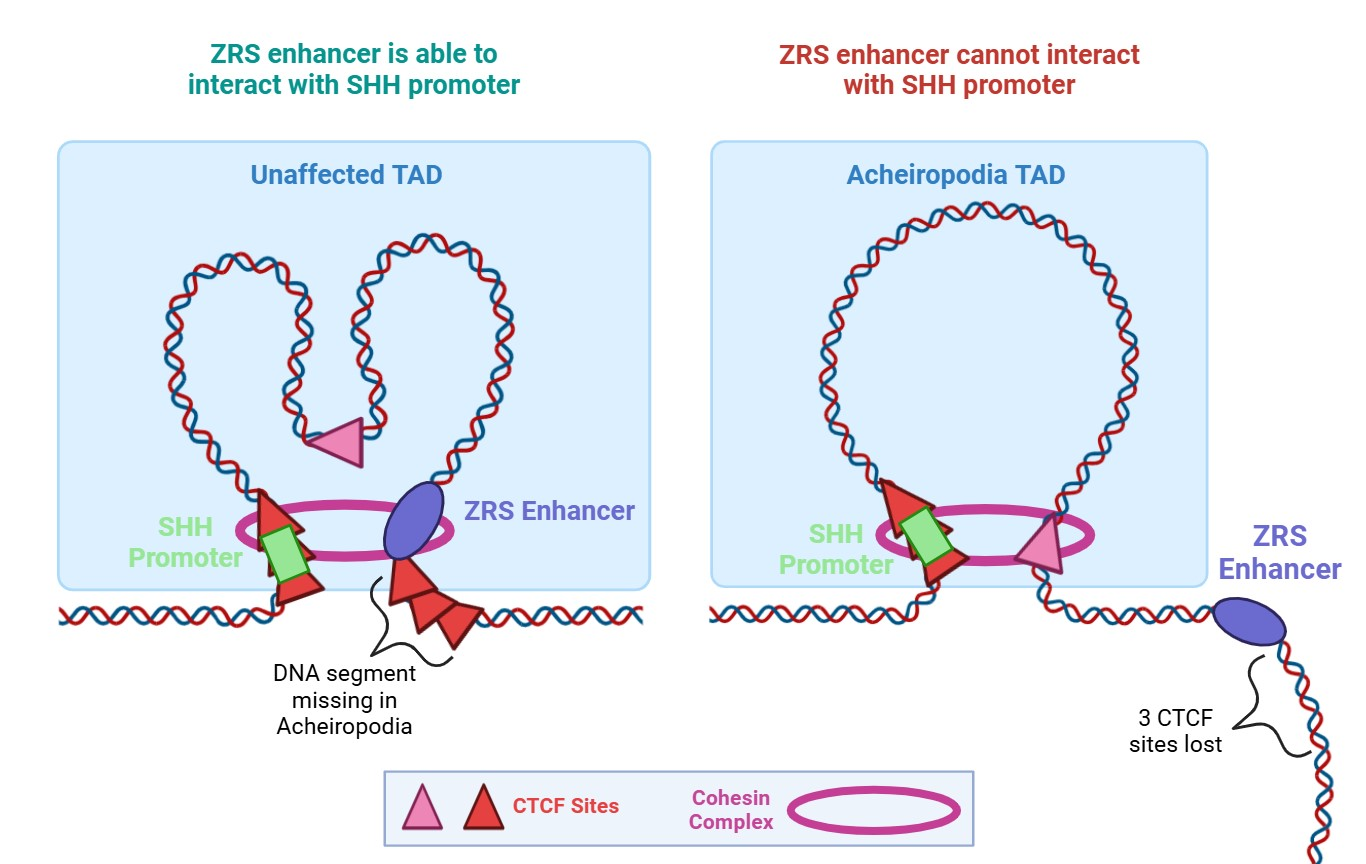
Model of the LMBR1-Sonic Hedgehog (SHH) topologically associating domain (TAD) impacted in Acheiropodia. The cohesin complex is a protein ring that assists in TAD formation. Removal of three CTCF sites changes the TAD organization, preventing the interaction of the ZRS enhancer with the SHH promoter. This results in decreased expression of SHH in Acheiropodia.

In Acheiropodia, 12,000 letters of DNA are removed, eliminating three CCCTC-binding factor (CTCF) sites. CTCF sites are where CTCF proteins bind. CTCF proteins help organize the genome by forming a topologically associating domain (TAD). TADs are regions of the genome where specific genes and regulatory elements, like enhancers, are grouped together in close physical proximity. The genome is dynamic and spatial organization influences which proteins are produced in the cell. To produce a protein, genes need the help of other genomic regions to become active. These regulatory regions need to be near genes to enable physical interactions and control of protein production. TADs enable frequent interactions of DNA elements within each group, thus assisting with regulating gene expression, an essential developmental process. When the three CTCF sites are present, they help an enhancer called ZRS (zone of polarizing activity regulatory sequence), which is found in intron 5 of the LMBR1 gene, interact with the Sonic Hedgehog (SHH) promoter. SHH is an important protein in limb development. When the ZRS enhancer can interact with the SHH promoter, there is increased expression of the SHH protein. However, in the case of acheiropodia, the 3 CTCF sites are missing, which prevents ZRS from interacting with the SHH promoter. This results in decreased SHH protein production for limb development.

== Diagnosis ==
The rarity and subsequent lack of information on acheiropodia makes prenatal diagnosis difficult. Diagnosis depends on prenatal ultrasound screening, with a failure to visualize bones at the ends of fetal limbs. Due to variable expressivity (range in severity and types of signs and symptoms experienced by patients) of the C7rof2 gene, acheiropodia presents differently among affected individuals, adding to the difficulty of diagnosis. Fingers are sometimes present, and a small bone at the tip of the shortened limb (the Bohomoletz bone) may or may not be present.

Acheiropodia has been diagnosed at as early as 16 weeks post-conception, although research on similar conditions suggests it may be diagnosed even earlier. If ultrasound screening indicates possible acheiropodia, further (more invasive) testing may be performed, including genetic analysis of either an amniotic fluid sample or placenta (chorionic villus) sample to confirm diagnosis. In the case of fetal death or termination, autopsy findings may conclude in a diagnosis.

== Treatment ==
Even with early prenatal diagnosis, due to its genetic basis acheiropodia cannot currently be prevented or cured. However, once a child is born with acheiropodia, prosthetics could improve their quality of life. Surgery may be considered on a case-by-case basis to optimize prosthetic fitting. Prosthetic fitting should occur before 2 years of age to minimize the risk of rejection. Ideally, fitting should begin around the 6-9 month mark, when healthy infants typically begin using their hands and feet to stand and handle objects. Even without prosthetics, many children with limb loss learn to functionally use their residual limbs and may prefer not to use prostheses so that they can maintain proprioception (i.e. sense of the body's position and motion) and sensory feedback that would otherwise be reduced. Some children may adapt with compensatory skills that are more effective than prostheses. A multidisciplinary approach may best treat the medical, psychological, and developmental challenges that may occur in infants missing all four limbs.

== Challenges with studying ==
Acheiropodia has proven to be challenging for researchers to study. Mice often serve as a model system to study human disease due to their similar physiology and genetics. However, it was previously observed that when the 12,000 letters of DNA in the mouse equivalent of the C7rof2 human gene were removed, limbs developed normally. The discrepancy in whether acheiropodia was present is likely due to differences in chromosomal interaction regulation, influenced by the location and orientation of the CTCF sites, among other factors, which may or may not be conserved between mice and humans.

Additionally, given the rarity of the condition there is a limited pool of affected patients who could participate in future research. The ethical implications with studying a gene expressed early in embryonic development, like the SHH gene, means that it can be difficult to obtain tissues for analysis.
