= W-box =

Type of cis-regulatory element

The W box is a deoxyribonucleic acid (DNA) cis-regulatory element sequence, (T)TGAC(C/T), which is recognized by the family of WRKY transcription factors.

Functionality and conservation of the W-box element across plant species has been shown by gel shift experiments, random binding site selection, yeast one-hybrid screens and co-transfection assays performed with many different WRKY proteins. In silico-based studies together with functional studies of plant promoters have identified clusters of W-boxes in stress-inducible promoters. The binding of WRKY proteins to W-boxes is a feature of both biotic and abiotic stress responses, together with other plant processes such as germination. It has also been shown that multiple W-boxes have a synergistic effect on transcription.

Almost all WRKY transcription factors bind preferentially to W-boxes, and since their discovery, this has raised the question as to how they show specificity for the promoters of their target genes. Ciolkowski et al. (2008) showed that although the W-box core is required, adjacent sequences also play a role in determining binding-site preference. Recent evidence suggests that the TGAC core is more degenerate, composed of a guanine adenine cytosine (GAC) core, and the upstream thymine and downstream pyrimidine flanking sequences help dictate recognition by specific WRKY factors. Basic residues of the WRKY protein domain also are believed to recognize the phosphate backbone of the cis-element.

Recently, Yamasaki et al. have determined the solution structure of the C-terminal WRKY domain of Arabidopsis WRKY4 in complex with the W-box DNA by NMR. They found that a four-stranded β-sheet enters the major groove of DNA in a structure they called the β-wedge, where the sheet is nearly perpendicular to the DNA helical ais. As predicted amino acids in the conserved WRKYGQK signature motif contact the W-box DNA.

== See also ==
- T-box
