= LMBR1 =

Protein-coding gene in the species Homo sapiens

Identifiers
- Aliases: LMBR1, ACHP, C7orf2, DIF14, PPD2, TPT, ZRS, LSS, THYP, limb development membrane protein 1
- External IDs: OMIM: 605522; MGI: 1861746; GeneCards: LMBR1

Gene location (Human)
| Chr. | Chromosome 7 (human) |
| Band | 7q36.3 | Start | 156,668,946 bp |
| Band | 7q36.3 | End | 156,893,216 bp |

Gene location (Mouse)
| Chr. | Chromosome 5 (mouse) |
| Band | 5 B1|5 14.81 cM | Start | 29,434,800 bp |
| Band | 5 B1|5 14.81 cM | End | 29,583,388 bp |
RNA expression pattern
| Bgee | Human / Mouse (ortholog); Top expressed in: sural nerve; Achilles tendon; bone marrow cell; right adrenal cortex; left adrenal gland; left adrenal cortex; epithelium of colon; ganglionic eminence; islet of Langerhans; smooth muscle tissue / Top expressed in: spermatid; spermatocyte; Rostral migratory stream; substantia nigra; primary oocyte; nucleus accumbens; interventricular septum; secondary oocyte; Paneth cell; temporal lobe; More reference expression data |
| BioGPS | n/a |
Orthologs
| Databases | NCBI: entry; OMA: entry |
| Species | Human | Mouse |
| Entrez | 64327 | 56873 |
| Ensembl | ENSG00000105983 | ENSMUSG00000010721 |
| UniProt | Q8WVP7 | Q9JIT0 |
| RefSeq (mRNA) | NM_022458; NM_001350953; NM_001350954; NM_001350955; NM_001350956 NM_001350957; NM_001350958; NM_001363409; NM_001363410; NM_001363411; NM_001363412; NM_001363413 | NM_020295 |
| RefSeq (protein) | NP_071903; NP_001337882; NP_001337883; NP_001337884; NP_001337885 NP_001337886; NP_001337887; NP_001350338; NP_001350339; NP_001350340; NP_001350341; NP_001350342 | NP_064691 |
| Location (UCSC) | Chr 7: 156.67 – 156.89 Mb | Chr 5: 29.43 – 29.58 Mb |
| PubMed search |
- Wikidata
| View/Edit Human | View/Edit Mouse |

Limb region 1 protein homolog is a protein that in humans is encoded by the LMBR1 gene.

This gene encodes a member of the LMBR1-like membrane protein family. Another member of this protein family has been shown to be a lipocalin transmembrane receptor. A highly conserved, cis-acting regulatory module for the sonic hedgehog (protein) gene is located within an intron of this gene. Consequently, disruption of this genic region can alter sonic hedgehog expression and affect limb patterning, but if this gene functions directly in limb development is unknown. Mutations and chromosomal deletions and rearrangements in this genic region are associated with acheiropody and preaxial polydactyly, which likely result from altered sonic hedgehog expression.
