= FGF16 =

Protein-coding gene in the species Homo sapiens

Identifiers
- Aliases: FGF16, FGF-16, MF4, fibroblast growth factor 16
- External IDs: OMIM: 300827; MGI: 1931627; GeneCards: FGF16

Gene location (Human)
| Chr. | X chromosome (human) |
| Band | Xq21.1 | Start | 77,447,389 bp |
| Band | Xq21.1 | End | 77,457,278 bp |

Gene location (Mouse)
| Chr. | X chromosome (mouse) |
| Band | X|X D | Start | 104,807,885 bp |
| Band | X|X D | End | 104,818,545 bp |
RNA expression pattern
| Bgee | Human / Mouse (ortholog); Top expressed in: gonad; thigh; muscle of thigh; subcutaneous adipose tissue; right coronary artery; ventricular zone; smooth muscle tissue; apex of heart; prefrontal cortex; thoracic aorta / Top expressed in: interventricular septum; nasal placode; otic pit; semicircular canal; right ventricle; posterior semicircular canal; embryo; myocardium of ventricle; anterior semicircular canal; cardiac muscles; More reference expression data |
| BioGPS | n/a |
Gene ontology
| Molecular function | fibroblast growth factor receptor binding; growth factor activity; 1-phosphatidylinositol-3-kinase activity; protein tyrosine kinase activity; phosphatidylinositol-4,5-bisphosphate 3-kinase activity |
| Cellular component | extracellular region; intracellular anatomical structure; extracellular space |
| Biological process | regulation of sprouting angiogenesis; positive regulation of endothelial cell chemotaxis to fibroblast growth factor; cell-cell signaling; MAPK cascade; fibroblast growth factor receptor signaling pathway; positive regulation of brown fat cell proliferation; regulation of endothelial cell proliferation; animal organ morphogenesis; regulation of MAP kinase activity; signal transduction; response to temperature stimulus; phosphatidylinositol phosphate biosynthetic process; phosphatidylinositol-3-phosphate biosynthetic process; peptidyl-tyrosine phosphorylation; regulation of signaling receptor activity; positive regulation of protein kinase B signaling |
Sources:Amigo / QuickGO
Orthologs
| Databases | NCBI: entry; OMA: entry |
| Species | Human | Mouse |
| Entrez | 8823 | 80903 |
| Ensembl | ENSG00000196468 | ENSMUSG00000031230 |
| UniProt | O43320 | Q9ESL8 |
| RefSeq (mRNA) | NM_003868 | NM_030614 |
| RefSeq (protein) | NP_003859 | NP_085117 |
| Location (UCSC) | Chr X: 77.45 – 77.46 Mb | Chr X: 104.81 – 104.82 Mb |
| PubMed search |
- Wikidata
| View/Edit Human | View/Edit Mouse |

Fibroblast growth factor 16 is a protein which in humans is encoded by the FGF16 gene.

== Function ==
The protein encoded by this gene is a member of the fibroblast growth factor (FGF) family. FGF family members possess broad mitogenic and cell survival activities, and are involved in a variety of biological processes, including embryonic development, cell growth, morphogenesis, tissue repair, tumor growth and invasion. The rat homolog is predominantly expressed in embryonic brown adipose tissue and has significant mitogenic activity, which suggests a role in proliferation of embryonic brown adipose tissue.

Mutations in this gene have been found associated to cases of X-linked recessive metacarpal 4/5 fusion.
