= GATA4 =

Protein-coding gene in the species Homo sapiens

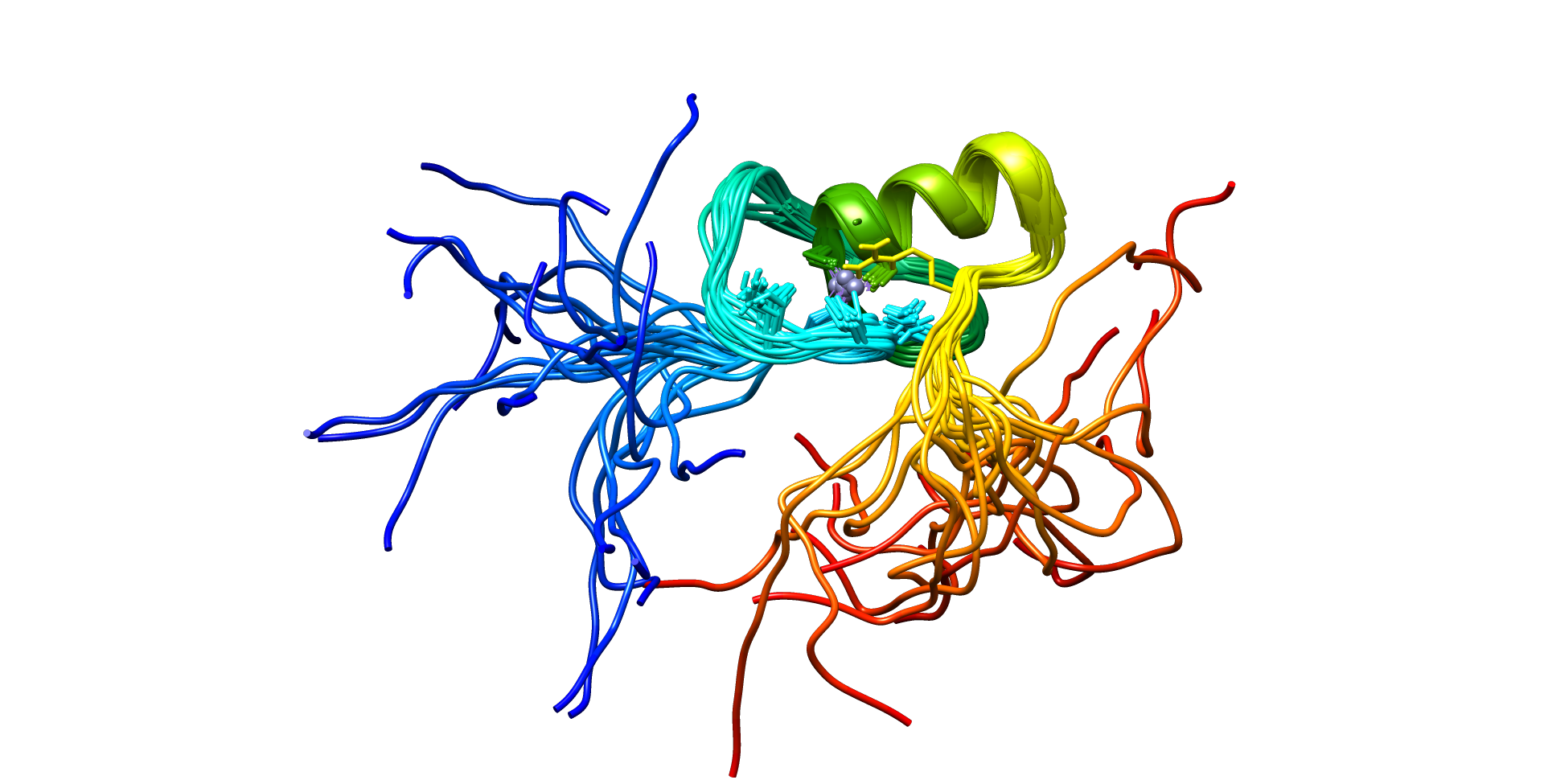

Identifiers
- Aliases: GATA4, GATA binding protein 4, ASD2, TACHD, VSD1, TOF
- External IDs: OMIM: 600576; MGI: 95664; GeneCards: GATA4
Available structures
| PDB | Ortholog search: PDBe RCSB |
| PDB | List of PDB id codes 2M9W |

Gene location (Human)
| Chr. | Chromosome 8 (human) |
| Band | 8p23.1 | Start | 11,676,959 bp |
| Band | 8p23.1 | End | 11,760,002 bp |

Gene location (Mouse)
| Chr. | Chromosome 14 (mouse) |
| Band | 14 D1|14 33.24 cM | Start | 63,436,371 bp |
| Band | 14 D1|14 33.24 cM | End | 63,509,141 bp |
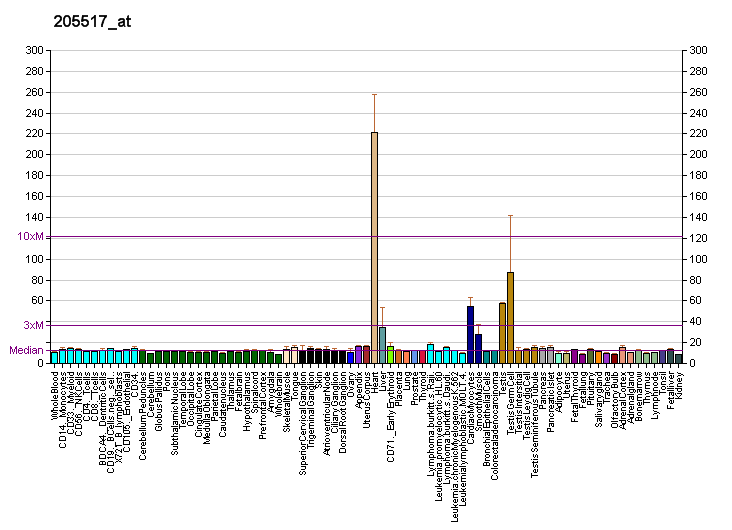
RNA expression pattern
| Bgee | Human / Mouse (ortholog); Top expressed in: right auricle of heart; left ventricle; duodenum; apex of heart; left ovary; right coronary artery; right ovary; body of pancreas; left coronary artery; right testis / Top expressed in: epithelium of stomach; germinal epithelium; pyloric antrum; duodenum; granulosa cell of ovary; mucous cell of stomach; Gonadal ridge; Leydig cell; theca folliculi; yolk sac; More reference expression data |
| BioGPS | More reference expression data |
Gene ontology
| Molecular function | DNA binding; sequence-specific DNA binding; co-SMAD binding; DNA-binding transcription factor activity; transcription coactivator activity; zinc ion binding; transcription factor binding; chromatin binding; metal ion binding; protein binding; cis-regulatory region sequence-specific DNA binding; DNA-binding transcription factor activity, RNA polymerase II-specific; RNA polymerase II transcription regulatory region sequence-specific DNA binding; DNA-binding transcription activator activity, RNA polymerase II-specific; protein kinase binding; NFAT protein binding; RNA polymerase II cis-regulatory region sequence-specific DNA binding |
| Cellular component | nucleoplasm; RNA polymerase II transcription regulator complex; nucleus; nuclear body |
| Biological process | endoderm development; male gonad development; regulation of transcription, DNA-templated; ventricular septum development; cell growth involved in cardiac muscle cell development; embryonic foregut morphogenesis; endocardial cushion development; cardiac muscle cell differentiation; cell-cell signaling; response to mechanical stimulus; blood coagulation; transcription by RNA polymerase II; transcription, DNA-templated; positive regulation of angiogenesis; positive regulation of transcription, DNA-templated; heart looping; atrial septum morphogenesis; response to vitamin A; regulation of cardiac muscle cell contraction; atrial septum secundum morphogenesis; atrial septum primum morphogenesis; intestinal epithelial cell differentiation; embryonic heart tube anterior/posterior pattern specification; positive regulation of BMP signaling pathway; positive regulation of cardioblast differentiation; positive regulation of vascular endothelial growth factor production; negative regulation of autophagy; cardiac ventricle morphogenesis; cardiac right ventricle morphogenesis; cellular response to glucose stimulus; positive regulation of transcription by RNA polymerase II; transdifferentiation; aortic valve morphogenesis; development of the heart; animal organ morphogenesis; tissue development; cell development; anatomical structure formation involved in morphogenesis; digestive tract development; cardiac muscle tissue development; atrioventricular valve formation; negative regulation of cardiac muscle cell apoptotic process; regulation of protein kinase B signaling; cardiac muscle tissue regeneration; positive regulation of ERK1 and ERK2 cascade; negative regulation of oxidative stress-induced cell death; negative regulation of apoptotic signaling pathway |
Sources:Amigo / QuickGO
Orthologs
| Databases | NCBI: entry; OMA: entry |
| Species | Human | Mouse |
| Entrez | 2626 | 14463 |
| Ensembl | ENSG00000136574; ENSG00000285109 | ENSMUSG00000021944 |
| UniProt | P43694 | Q08369 |
| RefSeq (mRNA) | NM_001308093; NM_001308094; NM_002052; NM_001374273; NM_001374274 | NM_008092; NM_001310610 |
| RefSeq (protein) | NP_001295022; NP_001295023; NP_002043; NP_001361202; NP_001361203 | NP_001297539; NP_032118 |
| Location (UCSC) | Chr 8: 11.68 – 11.76 Mb | Chr 14: 63.44 – 63.51 Mb |
| PubMed search |
- Wikidata
| View/Edit Human | View/Edit Mouse |

Transcription factor GATA-4 is a protein that in humans is encoded by the GATA4 gene.

== Function ==
This gene encodes a member of the GATA family of zinc finger transcription factors. Members of this family recognize the GATA motif which is present in the promoters of many genes. This protein is thought to regulate genes involved in embryogenesis and in myocardial differentiation and function. Mutations in this gene have been associated with cardiac septal defects as well as reproductive defects.

GATA4 is a critical transcription factor for proper mammalian cardiac development and essential for survival of the embryo. GATA4 works in combination with other essential cardiac transcription factors as well, such as Nkx2-5 and Tbx5. GATA4 is expressed in both embryo and adult cardiomyocytes where it functions as a transcriptional regulator for many cardiac genes, and also regulates hypertrophic growth of the heart. GATA4 promotes cardiac morphogenesis, cardiomyocytes survival, and maintains cardiac function in the adult heart. Mutations or defects in the GATA4 gene can lead to a variety of cardiac problems including congenital heart disease, abnormal ventral folding, and defects in the cardiac septum separating the atria and ventricles, and hypoplasia of the ventricular myocardium. As seen from the abnormalities from deletion of GATA4, it is essential for cardiac formation and the survival of the embryo during fetal development. GATA4 is not only important for cardiac development, but also development and function of the mammalian fetal ovary and contributes to fetal male gonadal development and mutations may lead to defects in reproductive development. GATA4 has also been discovered to have an integral role in controlling the early stages of pancreatic and hepatic development.

GATA4 is regulated through the autophagy-lysosome pathway in eukaryotic cells. In cellular senescence, ATM and ATR inhibit p62, an autophagy adaptor responsible for selective autophagy of GATA4. Inhibition of p62 leads to increased GATA4 levels, resulting in NF-kB activation and subsequent SASP induction.

== Atrioventricular valve formation ==
GATA4 expression during cardiac development has been shown to be essential to proper atrioventricular (AV) formation and function. Endocardial cells undergo epithelial to mesenchymal transitions (EMT) into the AV cushions during development. Their proliferation and fusion leads to division of the ventricular inlet into two different passageways with two AV valves, and they are thought to be under the influence of the GATA4 transcription factor. GATA4 inactivation, with GATA4-null mice, leads to down regulation of Erbb3 and altered Erk expression, two other important molecules in EMT and ventricular inlet separation. This has been shown to lead to pericardial effusion and peripheral hemorrhage in E12.5 mice, which succumb due to heart failure before weaning age. This data could have important implications for human medicine by suggesting that mutations with the GATA4 transcription factor could be responsible for AV cushion defects in humans with improper septal formation leading to congenital heart disease.

== Interactions ==
GATA4 has been shown to interact with NKX2-5, TBX5, Serum response factor HAND2, and HDAC2.

GATA4 has also been shown to interact with Erbb3, FOG-1, and FOG-2.

== Clinical relevance ==
Mutations in this gene have been associated to cases of congenital diaphragmatic hernia. Atrial septal defects, tetralogy of Fallot, and ventricular septal defects associated with GATA4 mutation were also seen in South Indian patients.

== See also ==
- GATA transcription factor
