= FLYWCH zinc finger =

FLYWCH zinc finger domain

Identifiers
- Symbol: FLYWCH
- Pfam: PF04500
- Pfam clan: CL0274
- InterPro: IPR007588
Available protein structures:
- Pfam: structures / ECOD
- PDB: RCSB PDB; PDBe; PDBj
- PDBsum: structure summary

In molecular biology, the FLYWCH zinc finger is a zinc finger domain. It is found in a number of eukaryotic proteins. FLYWCH is a C2H2-type zinc finger characterised by five conserved hydrophobic residues, containing the conserved sequence motif:

 F/Y-X(n)-L-X(n)-F/Y-X(n)-WXCX(6-12)CX(17-22)HXH 

where X indicates any amino acid. This domain was first characterised in Drosophila modifier of mdg4 proteins, Mod(mgd4), putative chromatin modulators involved in higher order chromatin domains. Mod(mdg4) proteins share a common N-terminal BTB/POZ domain, but differ in their C-terminal region, most containing C-terminal FLYWCH zinc finger motifs. The FLYWCH domain in Mod(mdg4) proteins has a putative role in protein-protein interactions; for example, Mod(mdg4)-67.2 interacts with DNA-binding protein Su(Hw) via its FLYWCH domain.

FLYWCH domains have been described in other proteins as well, including suppressor of killer of prune, Su(Kpn), which contains 4 terminal FLYWCH zinc finger motifs in a tandem array and a C-terminal glutathione S-transferase (GST) domain.
