= TBX5 (gene) =

Protein-coding gene that affects limb development and heart and bone function

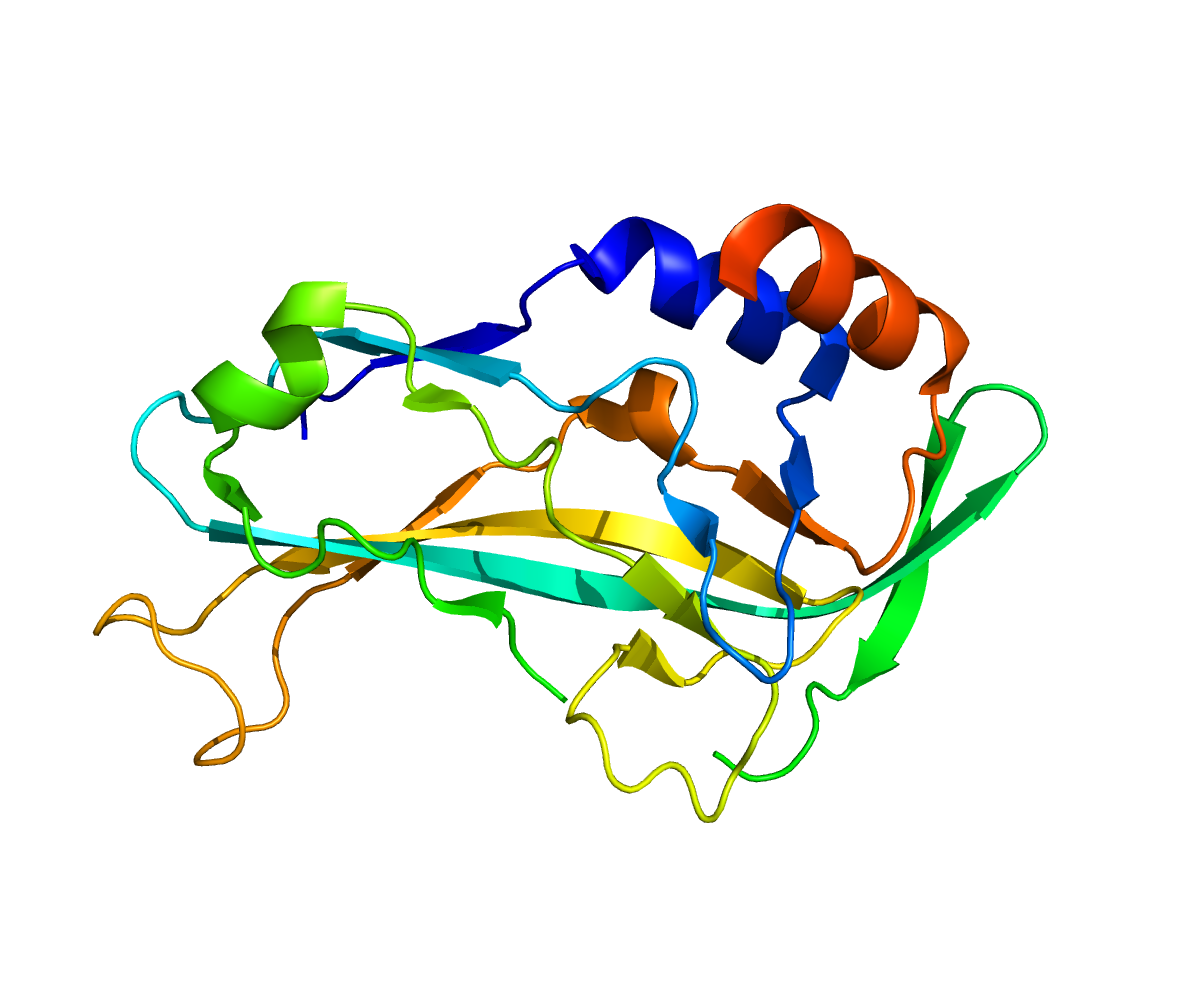

Identifiers
- Aliases: TBX5, HOS, T-box 5, T-box transcription factor 5
- External IDs: OMIM: 601620; MGI: 102541; GeneCards: TBX5
Available structures
PDB	Ortholog search: PDBe RCSB
PDB	List of PDB id codes 2X6U, 2X6V, 4S0H, 5BQD

Gene location (Human)
Chr.	Chromosome 12 (human)
Band	12q24.21	Start	114,353,911 bp
Band	12q24.21	End	114,408,442 bp

Gene location (Mouse)
Chr.	Chromosome 5 (mouse)
Band	5 F|5 60.42 cM	Start	119,970,733 bp
Band	5 F|5 60.42 cM	End	120,023,284 bp
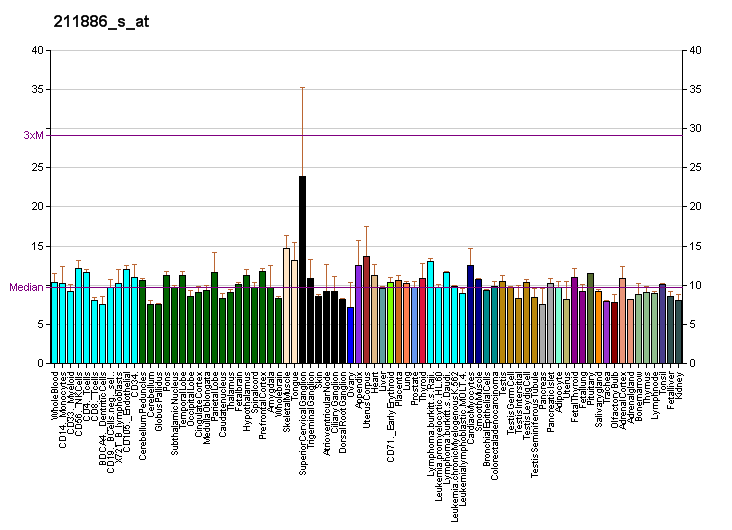

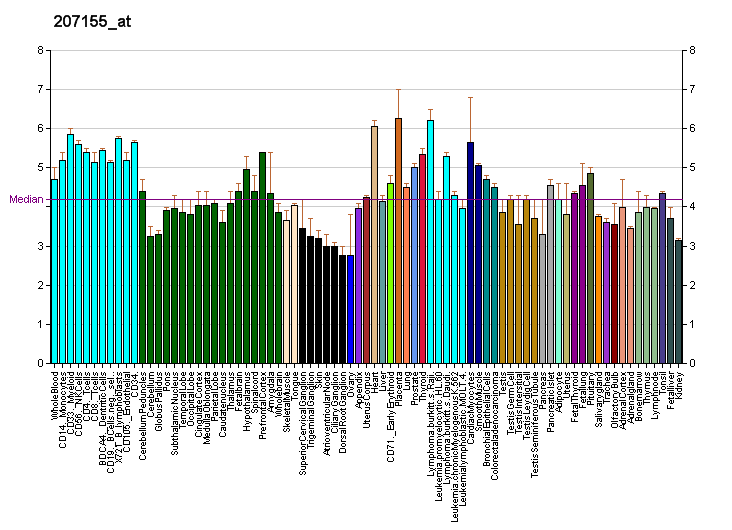
RNA expression pattern
Bgee	Human / Mouse (ortholog); Top expressed in: tendon of biceps brachii; cardiac muscle tissue of right atrium; buccal mucosa cell; right auricle of heart; lower lobe of lung; right ventricle; myocardium of left ventricle; visceral pleura; right lung; oocyte / Top expressed in: Cardiac muscle tissue of myocardium; vena cava; sinus venosus; genital tubercle; primordial ventricle; human penis; inferior vena cava; urethra; superior vena cava; interatrial septum; More reference expression data
BioGPS	More reference expression data
Gene ontology
Molecular function	sequence-specific DNA binding; RNA polymerase II transcription regulatory region sequence-specific DNA binding; DNA-binding transcription activator activity, RNA polymerase II-specific; transcription factor binding; protein binding; DNA-binding transcription factor activity; DNA binding; RNA polymerase II cis-regulatory region sequence-specific DNA binding; DNA-binding transcription factor activity, RNA polymerase II-specific
Cellular component	nucleoplasm; nucleus; protein-containing complex; protein-DNA complex; cytoplasm
Biological process	pattern specification process; forelimb morphogenesis; ventricular cardiac muscle tissue development; regulation of transcription, DNA-templated; bundle of His development; lung development; endocardial cushion development; cardiac muscle cell differentiation; cell-cell signaling; transcription, DNA-templated; morphogenesis of an epithelium; atrial septum morphogenesis; multicellular organism development; negative regulation of cell migration; positive regulation of cardiac muscle cell proliferation; atrioventricular valve morphogenesis; cell migration involved in coronary vasculogenesis; embryonic limb morphogenesis; pericardium development; positive regulation of cardioblast differentiation; positive regulation of secondary heart field cardioblast proliferation; transcription initiation from RNA polymerase II promoter; negative regulation of cardiac muscle cell proliferation; atrial septum development; embryonic forelimb morphogenesis; negative regulation of epithelial to mesenchymal transition; negative regulation of cell population proliferation; cardiac left ventricle formation; ventricular septum development; development of the heart; positive regulation of transcription, DNA-templated; positive regulation of transcription by RNA polymerase II
Sources:Amigo / QuickGO
Orthologs
Databases	NCBI: entry; OMA: entry
Species	Human	Mouse
Entrez	6910	21388
Ensembl	ENSG00000089225	ENSMUSG00000018263
UniProt	Q99593	P70326
RefSeq (mRNA)	NM_181486; NM_000192; NM_080717; NM_080718	NM_011537
RefSeq (protein)	NP_000183; NP_542448; NP_852259	NP_035667
Location (UCSC)	Chr 12: 114.35 – 114.41 Mb	Chr 5: 119.97 – 120.02 Mb
PubMed search
- Wikidata
View/Edit Human	View/Edit Mouse

T-box transcription factor TBX5, (T-box protein 5) is a protein that in humans is encoded by the TBX5 gene. Abnormalities in the TBX5 gene can result in altered limb development, Holt-Oram syndrome, Tetra-amelia syndrome, and cardiac and skeletal problems.

This gene is a member of a phylogenetically conserved family of genes that share a common DNA-binding domain, the T-box. T-box genes encode transcription factors involved in the regulation of developmental processes. This gene is closely linked to related family member T-box 3 (ulnar mammary syndrome) on human chromosome 12.

TBX5 is located on the long arm of chromosome 12. TBX5 produces a protein called T-box protein 5 that acts as a transcription factor. TBX5 is involved with forelimb and heart development. This gene impacts the early development of the forelimb by triggering fibroblast growth factor, FGF10.

== Function ==
TBX5 is a transcription factor that codes for the protein called T-box 5. The transcription factors it encodes are necessary for development, especially in the pattern formation of upper limbs and cardiac growth. TBX5 is involved with the development of the four heart chambers, the electrical conducting system, and the septum separating the right and left sides of the heart. Along with playing roles in the development of the heart, septum, and electrical system of the heart, it also activates genes that are involved in the development of the upper limbs, the arms and hands.

This gene is also involved in the muscle connective tissue for muscle and tendon patterning. A study showed that deletion of TBX5 in forelimbs causes disruption in the muscle and tendon patterning without affecting the skeleton's development. T-box protein 5 expression is in the cells of the lateral plate mesoderm which form the forelimb bud and the cascade of limb initiation. In its absence, no forelimb bud forms.

The encoded protein plays a major role in limb development, specifically during limb bud initiation. For instance, in chickens Tbx5 specifies forelimb status. The activation of Tbx5 and other T-box proteins by Hox genes activates signaling cascades that involve the Wnt signaling pathway and FGF signals in limb buds. Ultimately, Tbx5 leads to the development of apical ectodermal ridge (AER) and zone of polarizing activity (ZPA) signaling centers in the developing limb bud, which specify the orientation growth of the developing limb. Together with Tbx4, Tbx5 plays a role in patterning the soft tissues (muscles and tendons) of the musculoskeletal system.

As a protein-coding gene, TBX5 encodes for the protein T-box Transcription Factor 5, which is a part of the T-box family of transcription factors. It also interacts with other genes, such as GATA4 and NKX2-5, and the BAF chromatin-remodeling complex to drive and repress gene expression during development.

=== Role in non-human animals ===
Mice that were genetically modified to not have the TBX5 gene did not survive gestation, due to the heart not developing past embryonic day E10.5. Mice that only had one working copy of TBX5 were born with morphological problems such as enlarged hearts, atrial and ventral septum defects, and limb malformations similar to those found in the Holt-Oram Syndrome.

Pigeons with feathered feet have Tbx5 active in the hind feet, which cause them to develop feathered hindlimbs with thicker bones, more similar to their frontlimb wings.

=== Role in human embryonic development ===
A gene knockout model for TBX5 by CRISPR/Cas9 genome editing has been created. This homozygous TBX5 knockout human embryonic stem cell line, called TBX5-KO maintained stem cell-like morphology, pluripotency markers, normal karyotype, and could differentiate into all three germ layers in vivo. This cell line can provide an in vitro platform for studying the pathogenic mechanisms and biological function of TBX5 in the heart development. By understanding what happens in development without this gene, further treatment options for fetuses with a TBX5 mutation might be possible to prevent the severe cardiac defects associated with Holt-Oram Syndrome.

== Clinical significance ==
Mutations in this gene can result in Holt–Oram syndrome, a developmental disorder affecting the heart and upper limbs. Holt-Oram syndrome can cause a hole in the septum, bone abnormalities in the fingers, wrists, or arms, and a conduction disease leading to abnormal heart rates and arrhythmias. The most common cardiac issue associated with this condition is the malformation of the septum, which separates the left and right sides of the heart.

Tetra-amelia syndrome is a condition where forelimb malformation occurs because FGF-10 is not triggered due to Tbx5 mutations. This condition can lead to the absence of one or both forelimbs.

Skeletally, there may be abnormally bent fingers, sloping shoulders, and phocomelia. Cardiac defects include ventral and atrial septation and problems with the conduction system. Several transcript variants encoding different isoforms have been described for this gene.

== Interactions ==
TBX5 (gene) has been shown to interact with:

- GATA4 and
- NKX2-5.
