= Andrea Superti-Furga =

Swiss and Italian paediatrician, geneticist and molecular biologist

Professor Andrea Superti-Furga
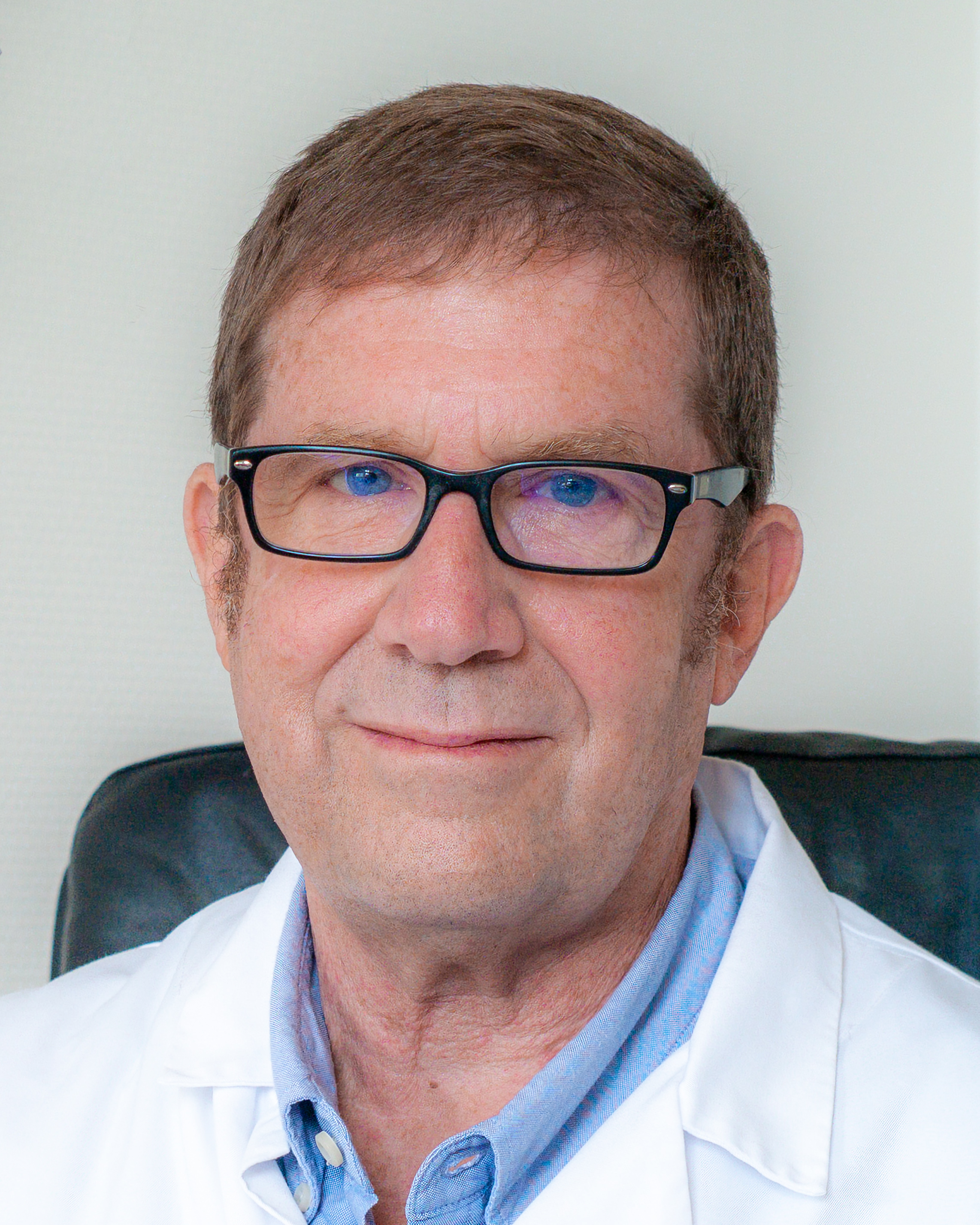
- Andrea Superti-Furga in 2021
- Born: 1959 (age 66–67); Milano, Italy
- Citizenship: Swiss and Italian
- Education: University of Milan, University of Genoa, University of Zurich, University of Freiburg
- Known for: Metabolic Disorders, Connective Tissue Disorders, Skeletal Dysplasias, Clinical Genetics, Molecular Genetics
- Spouse: Sheila Unger
- Children: 5
- Awards: 2015 Maroteaux Award, 2002 Cloëtta Prize
- Scientific career
- Fields: Genetics, paediatrics, medicine
- Workplaces: Istituto Giannina Gaslini, Kinderspital Zürich, University of Zurich, University of Freiburg University of Lausanne, Lausanne University Hospital, Genetica AG
- Thesis: Banca di cellule umane mutanti (University of Genoa) (1984)
- Doctoral advisor: Paolo Durand
- Other academic advisors: Victor McKusick, Andrea Prader, Andres Giedion, Richard Gitzelmann, Beat Steinmann, Sergio Fanconi
- Website: www.genetica.ch

Andrea Superti-Furga (born 1959 in Milan) is a Swiss-Italian pediatrician, geneticist and molecular biologist.

== Career ==
Superti-Furga was educated at the German School of Milan in Milan, where he obtained his Abitur in 1978. He studied medicine at the Universities of Milan, Genoa, and Zurich, obtained his MD degrees from Genoa in 1984 and from Zurich in 1992 and is board certified in paediatrics and in genetics. During his studies he has been mentored by Paolo Durand, Victor McKusick, Andrea Prader, Andres Giedion, Richard Gitzelmann, Beat Steinmann, and Sergio Fanconi. He worked with Francesco Ramirez on genetic diseases in both Zurich and New York. In 2002, he was appointed professor for Molecular Pediatrics at the University of Lausanne, before moving as a professor and chairman of the Department of Pediatrics to the University of Freiburg, Germany in 2005. In 2010, he was awarded the Leenaards Chair of Excellence in Pediatrics at the University of Lausanne. From 2014 to 2015, he was director of the Department of Pediatrics in Lausanne. From 2016 to 2023, he has been head of Genetic Medicine at the Lausanne University Hospital, Switzerland. Since 2023, he is senior consultant at Genetica AG in Zurich and Lausanne.

== Research ==
Superti-Furga's research activities have been focused on inborn errors of metabolism, inherited disorders of connective tissue, genetic bone disorders and skeletal dysplasias, dysmorphology, neurodevelopment, and bioinformatics. He was involved in the discovery of the molecular and biochemical basis of a number of genetic disorders, such as the Ehlers–Danlos syndrome type IV related to collagen type III, the sulfate transporter (SLC26A2)-related chondrodysplasias, the TBX15-related Cousin syndrome, the FAM111A-related disorders Kenny-Caffey syndrome and Osteocraniostenosis, the tartrate-resistant acid phosphatase(ACP5)-related spondyloenchondrodysplasia, the SFRP4-related Pyle disease, the HSPA9-related EVEN-PLUS syndrome, sialic acid deficiency related to NANS, the malformation disorders related to EN1, and the EN1-regulating lncRNA element, MAENLI, and the TIMES syndrome related to the VRAC channel subunit LRRC8C.

According to Google Scholar, Superti-Furga has published more than 400 articles and holds an h-index of 96 (October 2026).

== Personal life ==
Superti-Furga is married to geneticist Sheila Unger, MD. He is the brother of Giulio Superti-Furga, a molecular and system biologist, director of the Center for Molecular Medicine in Vienna.

== Distinctions ==
He is the recipient of the 2015 Maroteaux Award of the International Skeletal Dysplasia Society, the 2002 Cloëtta Prize by the Max Cloëtta Foundation, and the 1995 Georg-Friedrich Götz prize of the Medical School of the University of Zurich. In 2008, he was Santa Chiara visiting chair at University of Siena's School of Medicine.

He has a member of the executive board of the Swiss Academy of Medical Sciences (SAMW), and he has been president of the committee for pediatrics of the Pfizer Prize Foundation. He is member of the German National Academy of Sciences Leopoldina. as well as member of the scientific board of the Novartis Foundation for Medical-Biological Research.

== Selected works ==
=== Papers ===
- Superti-Furga, Andrea; Hästbacka, Johanna; Wilcox, William R.; Cohn, Daniel H.; van der Harten, Hans J.; Rossi, Antonio; Blau, Nenad; Rimoin, David L.; Steinmann, Beat; Lander, Eric S.; Gitzelmann, Richard (January 1996). "Achondrogenesis type IB is caused by mutations in the diastrophic dysplasia sulphate transporter gene". Nature Genetics. 12 (1): 100–102. doi:10.1038/ng0196-100. ISSN 1061-4036. PMID 8528239. S2CID 31143438.
- Pepin, Melanie; Schwarze, Ulrike; Superti-Furga, Andrea; Byers, Peter H. (9 March 2000). "Clinical and Genetic Features of Ehlers–Danlos Syndrome Type IV, the Vascular Type". New England Journal of Medicine. 342 (10): 673–680. doi:10.1056/nejm200003093421001. ISSN 0028-4793. PMID 10706896.
- Lausch, Ekkehart; Hermanns, Pia; Farin, Henner F.; Alanay, Yasemin; Unger, Sheila; Nikkel, Sarah; Steinwender, Christoph; Scherer, Gerd; Spranger, Jürgen; Zabel, Bernhard; Kispert, Andreas; Superti-Furga, Andrea (November 2008). "TBX15 Mutations Cause Craniofacial Dysmorphism, Hypoplasia of Scapula and Pelvis, and Short Stature in Cousin Syndrome". The American Journal of Human Genetics. 83 (5): 649–655. doi:10.1016/j.ajhg.2008.10.011. ISSN 0002-9297. PMC 2668032. PMID 19068278.
- Lausch, Ekkehart; Janecke, Andreas; Bros, Matthias; Trojandt, Stefanie; Alanay, Yasemin; De Laet, Corinne; Hübner, Christian A; Meinecke, Peter; Nishimura, Gen; Matsuo, Mari; Hirano, Yoshiko (9 January 2011). "Genetic deficiency of tartrate-resistant acid phosphatase associated with skeletal dysplasia, cerebral calcifications and autoimmunity". Nature Genetics. 43 (2): 132–137. doi:10.1038/ng.749. ISSN 1061-4036. PMID 21217752. S2CID 205357235.
- Vissers, Lisenka E.L.M.; Lausch, Ekkehart; Unger, Sheila; Campos-Xavier, Ana Belinda; Gilissen, Christian; Rossi, Antonio; Del Rosario, Marisol; Venselaar, Hanka; Knoll, Ute; Nampoothiri, Sheela; Nair, Mohandas (May 2011). "Chondrodysplasia and Abnormal Joint Development Associated with Mutations in IMPAD1, Encoding the Golgi-Resident Nucleotide Phosphatase, gPAPP". The American Journal of Human Genetics. 88 (5): 608–615. doi:10.1016/j.ajhg.2011.04.002. ISSN 0002-9297. PMC 3146727. PMID 21549340.
- Unger, Sheila; Górna, Maria W.; Le Béchec, Antony; Do Vale-Pereira, Sonia; Bedeschi, Maria Francesca; Geiberger, Stefan; Grigelioniene, Giedre; Horemuzova, Eva; Lalatta, Faustina; Lausch, Ekkehart; Magnani, Cinzia (June 2013). "FAM111A Mutations Result in Hypoparathyroidism and Impaired Skeletal Development". The American Journal of Human Genetics. 92 (6): 990–995. doi:10.1016/j.ajhg.2013.04.020. ISSN 0002-9297. PMC 3675238. PMID 23684011.
- van Karnebeek, Clara D M; Bonafé, Luisa; Wen, Xiao-Yan; Tarailo-Graovac, Maja; Balzano, Sara; Royer-Bertrand, Beryl; Ashikov, Angel; Garavelli, Livia; Mammi, Isabella; Turolla, Licia; Breen, Catherine (23 May 2016). "NANS-mediated synthesis of sialic acid is required for brain and skeletal development" (PDF). Nature Genetics. 48 (7): 777–784. doi:10.1038/ng.3578. ISSN 1061-4036. PMID 27213289. S2CID 24953080.
- Simsek Kiper, Pelin O.; Saito, Hiroaki; Gori, Francesca; Unger, Sheila; Hesse, Eric; Yamana, Kei; Kiviranta, Riku; Solban, Nicolas; Liu, Jeff; Brommage, Robert; Boduroglu, Koray (30 June 2016). "Cortical-Bone Fragility — Insights from sFRP4 Deficiency in Pyle's Disease". New England Journal of Medicine. 374 (26): 2553–2562. doi:10.1056/nejmoa1509342. ISSN 0028-4793. PMC 5070790. PMID 27355534.

=== Books ===
- Spranger, Jürgen W.; Brill, Paula W.; Hall, Christine; Superti-Furga, Andrea; Unger, Sheila (12 November 2018). Bone Dysplasias: An Atlas of Genetic Disorders of Skeletal Development. Oxford University Press. ISBN 978-0-19-062665-5.
