= Fuat Sevimay =

Turkish writer and translator (born 1972)

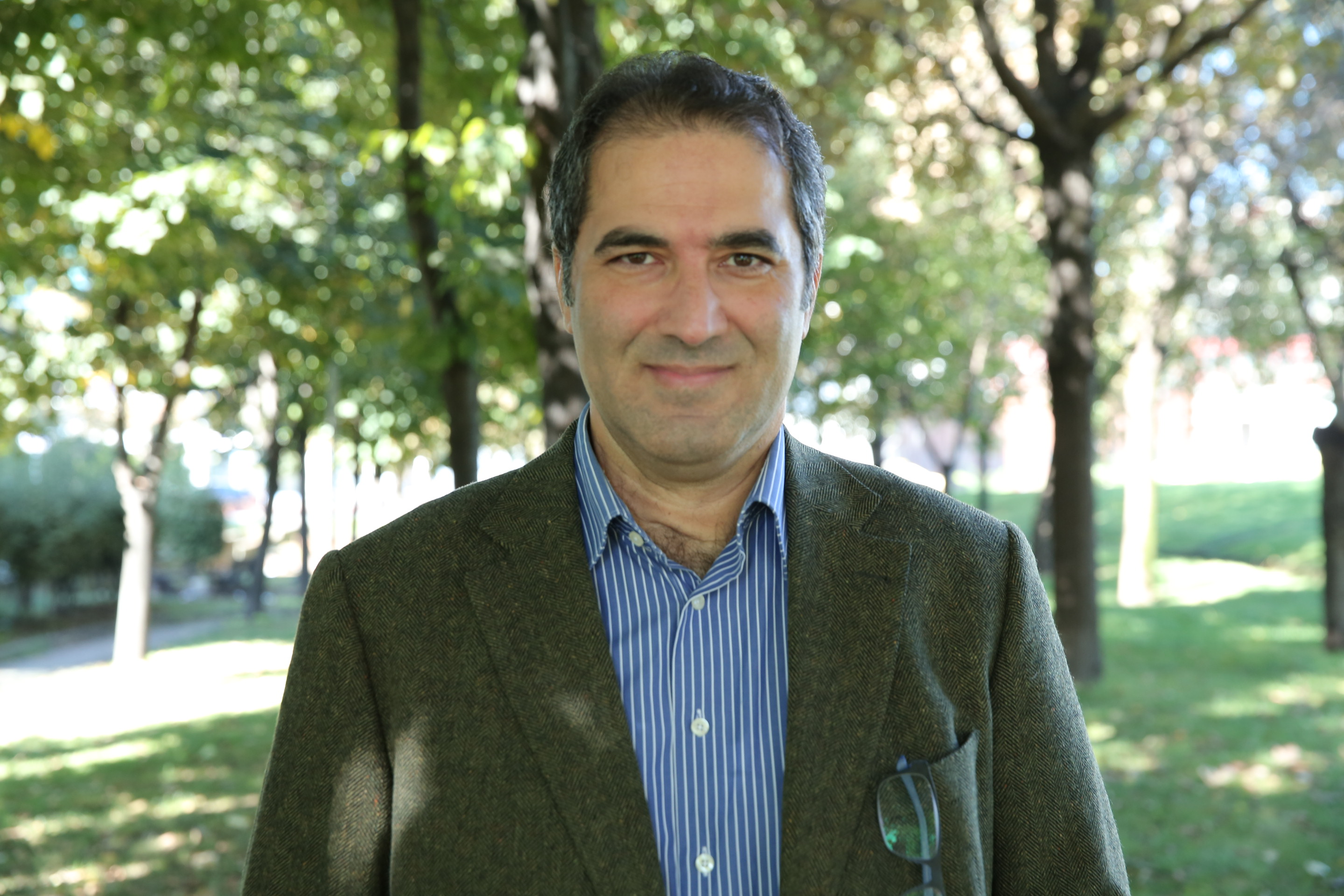
- Sevimay in 2019
- Born: 8 March 1972 (age 54); Zonguldak, Turkey
- Occupations: Writer, translator

Fuat Sevimay (born 8 March 1972) is a Turkish writer and translator.

== Life ==
Sevimay was born on 8 March 1972 in Zonguldak. He studied in Kadıköy Anatolian High School and finished his English Business degree in Marmara University.

His novel named Kapalıçarşı, received the Ahmet Hamdi Tanpınar Award in 2016, his story book Ara Nağme received the Orhan Kemal Story Award in 2014, his children's book Haydar Paşa'nın Evi was awarded by Ankara Chamber of Architects, his translation of Finnegans Wake received the Talât Sait Halman Translation Award and also Dünya Gazetesi Translation of the Year Award in 2017. He also wrote the novels Aynalı and Anarşık, chilldren's books Hişt Hişt and Hayal Kurmak Bedava. He is the translator of all of James Joyce's works to Turkish. His translations also include writers like Italo Svevo, Luigi Pirandello, Henry James, Oscar Wilde and Paul Beatty. His works has been translated to languages including Serbian, Arabic, Croatian, English, Albanian, Urdu, Italian and Georgian.

== Works ==
- Aziz ile Nikola - novel- 2023- İthaki Yayınları
- Gör Bağır- story - 2022- İthaki Yayınları
- Benden'iz James Joyce - novel - 2020 - İthaki Yayınları
- Haydarpaşa'nın Evi - children's book - 2020 - Hep Kitap
- Çeviri'Bilirsin! Edebiyatın Gizli Kahramanlığı Hakkında Notlar - 2018 - Hep Kitap
- Hayal Kurmak Bedava - children's book - 2018 - Hep Kitap
- Hişt Hişt - children's book - 2018 - Hep Kitap
- Kapalıçarşı - novel - 2017 - İthaki Yayınları
- Anarşık - novel - 2017 - Hep Kitap
- Aynalı - novel - 2011 - İthaki Yayınları
- Ara Nağme - story - 2014 - Hep Kitap

== Translations ==
- James Joyce- Oda Müziği (Chamber Music) - 2023- İthaki Yayıncılık
- Aldous Huxley- Zaman Artık Durmalı (Time Must Have a Stop) - 2023- İthaki Yayıncılık
- Luigi Pirandello- Biri, Hiçbiri, Binlercesi (One, No One and One Hundred Thousand) - 2021- İthaki Yayıncılık
- James Joyce - Dublinliler (Dubliners) - 2020 - İthaki Yayıncılık
- James Joyce - Denemeler, Makaleler, Eleştiriler (Essays, Critical Writings) - 2020 - İthaki Yayıncılık
- Italo Svevo - Yaşlılık (As a Man Grows Older) - 2020 - İthaki Yayıncılık
- Italo Svevo - İyi Yürekli Yaşlı Adam ile Güzel Kızın Öyküsü (The Nice Old Man and the Pretty Girl) - 2020 - İthaki Yayıncılık
- James Joyce - Ulysses - 2019 - İthaki Yayıncılık
- James Joyce - Sanatçının Gençlik Portresi (A Portrait of the Artist as a Young Man) - 2019 - İthaki Yayıncılık
- Paul Beatty - Serisonu (The Sellout) - 2018 - Hep Kitap
- James Joyce - Sürgünler (Exiles) - 2017 - İthaki Yayıncılık
- James Joyce - Finnegan Uyanması (Finnegans Wake) - 2016 - Sel Yayıncılık

== Awards ==
- Gör Bağır - 2022 - Fakir Baykurt Story Award
- Finnegan Uyanması (Finnegans Wake) - 2017 - İKSV Talat Sait Halman Translation Award
- Dünya Gazetesi Translation of the Year Award
- Kadıköy Anadolu Lisesi 2016 Kristal Martı Award
- Kapalıçarşı - 2015 - Ahmet Hamdi Tanpınar Novel Award Honourable Mention
- Ara Nağme - 2014 - Orhan Kemal Story Award
- Haydarpaşa İstanbullularındır- 2012- Ankara Chamber of Architects Award
