= Fabio Vittorini =

Italian literary critic (born 1971)

- Born: December 19, 1971 (age 54); Ancona (Italy)
- Occupation: literary critic
- Notable work: Melodramma, Raccontare oggi, Narrativa USA 1984-2014

Fabio Vittorini (born 19 December 1971) is an Italian literary critic, currently Professor of Comparative Literature at IULM University of Milan (Italy) He is known for his studies on opera and on metamodern narratives. He is the author of many books and articles.

== Biography ==
In 1995 he graduated in Modern Literature at University of Bologna under the supervision of Mario Lavagetto. In 1999 he got a Ph.D. in Literary Theory at University of Bergamo.

Between 1996 and 2001 he gave seminars on Literary Theory and Comparative Literature at University of Bologna. Between 2001 and 2002 he was lecturer of Italian Contemporary Literature at University of Modena and Reggio Emilia. Between 2002 and 2007 he was associate professor of Comparative Literature and Music and Image at IULM University of Milan. Since 2018 he is full professor at the same university, where he also coordinates a Master (Television, cinema and new media) and a Multimedia Laboratory, and is a member of the board of Visual and Media Studies Ph.D.

He is a member of the Italian National Council of Literary Critic and Comparative Literature.

He is a member of the steering committees of the following reviews of comparative literature: "Poli-Femo", "Symbolon" and "Comparatismi".

He is a member of the editorial office of the movies webzine duels.it.

He reviews musical events for the Italian newspaper Il Manifesto.

He is author and host of cultural tv shows for Italian National Television RAI.

== Research Interests ==
=== Gender Studies ===
In the book Normal People. Gender and generations in transit between literature and media (2022), together with other colleagues from IULM University, he mapped the complex relationships between gender identity and literary and media genres in the contemporary landscape.

In the two volumes Queer Bodies. Trans* identities in literature and media. From the end of the 19th century to the 1970s and Queer Bodies. Trans* identities in literature and media. From the 1970s to today, both published in 2024, he reconstructed the history of the connected concepts of gender identity and transition in literature and media from the end of the 19th century to the present, with particular attention to the Italian cultural context.

=== Opera and Melodrama ===
In his book Shakespeare and romantic opera (2000) he outlined how Shakespeare's plays entered the European continental literature and culture, mostly through French dramatic rewritings during the 18th century and, after the romantic consecration, through Italian operatic adaptations during the 19th century.

In his book The Threshold of the Invisible. A Journey into Macbeth: Shakespeare, Verdi, Welles (2005), he deepened the points of the intertextual, inter-semiotic, inter-cultural and intermedial translation focusing on the case of Macbeth (Shakespeare's tragedy, Giuseppe Verdi's opera and Orson Welles's movie)

In his book Dream in Opera. Oneiric Tales and Operatic Texts (2010) he used the Freud's psychoanalysis tools to build a theory about the structural relationship between oneiric and operatic languages.

In his book Melodrama. An intermedia path between theater, novel, cinema and TV series (2020) he explored the melodramatic mode as a typically modern device of aesthetic knowledge, going back to the origins of the melodramatic imagination, mapping its deep structures and reconstructing the historical relationships between the genre where it initially crystallized (mélodrame) and the contemporary or later genres where it spread, in particular romantic opera, realist-naturalist novel, American film and television melodrama, psychoanalysis and European auteur cinema, contemporary novel.

=== Narratology and Metamodernism ===
In his very first book Story and Plot (1998) and in the following The Narrative Text (2005) he explored possibilities of classical narratology to define the recurring structures of narrative texts in modern, modernist and postmodernist traditions.

In 2015, after a decade of academic courses and studies, in his book USA Narrative 1984-2014: Novels, Films, Graphic Novels, TV Series, Video-games etc., he outlined the story of contemporary United States narrative fiction.

In 2017, in his book Telling today. Metamodernism between narratology, hermeneutics and intermediality, starting from the previous exploration and extending it beyond the limits of USA culture, he tried to develop a theory of the metamodern narratives.

=== Italo Svevo ===
In 2004 he carried out the philological edition of La coscienza di Zeno and of the unfinished forth novel by Italo Svevo (Il vecchione or Il vegliardo), within The Complete Works of Italo Svevo (3 voll., Milano, Mondadori, ed. by Mario Lavagetto), which imposed itself as the basic edition for any later Svevo's critics.

In 2011 he wrote Italo Svevo, a monographic book on the author.

== Bibliography ==
=== Books ===
- Queer Bodies. Identità trans* nella letteratura e nei media. Da fine Ottocento agli anni Settanta (Queer Bodies. Trans* identities in literature and media. From the end of the 19th century to the 1970s), Bologna, Pàtron, 2024, ISBN 978-88-555-3633-2
- Queer Bodies. Identità trans* nella letteratura e nei media. Dagli anni Settanta a oggi (Queer Bodies. Trans* identities in literature and media. From the 1970s to today), Bologna, Pàtron, 2024, ISBN 978-88-555-3633-2
- Normal People. Gender e generazioni in transito tra letteratura e media (Normal People. Genders and generations in transit between literature and media), ed. by Fabio Vittorini and Federico Bortolini, Bologna, Pàtron, 2022, ISBN 978-88-555-3543-4
- Melodramma. Un percorso intermediale tra teatro, romanzo, cinema e serie tv (Melodrama. An intermedia path between theater, novel, cinema and TV series), Bologna, Pàtron, 2020, ISBN 978-88-555-3484-0
- Nuove narrazioni mediali. Musica, immagine, racconto (New media narrations. Music, image, story), ed. by Fabio Vittorini, Bologna, Pàtron, 2019
- Raccontare oggi. Metamodernismo tra narratologia, ermeneutica e intermedialità (Telling today. Metamodernism between narratology, hermeneutics and intermediality), Bologna, Pàtron, 2017
- Narrativa USA 1984-2014: romanzi, film, graphic novel, serie tv, videogame e altro (USA Narrative 1984-2014: Novels, Films, Graphic Novels, TV Series, Video-games etc.), Bologna, Pàtron, 2015
- Italo Svevo, Milano, Mondadori, 2011
- Il sogno all'opera. Racconti onirici e testi melodrammatici (Dream in Opera. Oneiric Tales and Operatic Texts), Palermo, Sellerio, 2010
- Il testo narrativo (The Narrative Text), Roma, Carrocci, 2005
- La soglia dell'invisibile. Percorsi del Macbeth: Shakespeare, Verdi, Welles (The Threshold of the Invisible. A Journey into Macbeth: Shakespeare, Verdi, Welles), Roma, Carocci, 2005
- Italo Svevo: Guida alla "Coscienza di Zeno" (Italo Svevo: A Guidebook to "La Coscienza di Zeno"), Roma, Carocci, 2003
- Shakespeare e il melodramma romantico (Shakespeare and Romantic Opera), Firenze, La Nuova Italia, 2000
- Fabula e intreccio (Story and Plot), Firenze, La Nuova Italia, 1998

== TV Programs ==
2015: Spoon River Anthology (on Edgar Lee Masters' poems)

2017: Dracula (on Bram Stoker's novel and its adaptations)

2018: Edgar Allan Poe - The Last Four Days (on the life and works of the writer).

2022: The Creation of Frankenstein (on the life and works of Mary Shelley)
