= Desiring Julia =

- Directed by: Andrea Barzini
- Starring: Serena Grandi; Johan Leysen
- Cinematography: Mario Vulpiani
- Music by: Antonio Sechi
- Release date: 1986
- Country: Italy
- Language: Italian

Desiderando Giulia, internationally released as Desiring Julia, is a 1986 Italian erotic drama film directed by Andrea Barzini. It is loosely based on the 1898 novel Senilità by Italo Svevo.

== Plot ==
Emilio, an unsuccessful writer, lives in a comfortable apartment in Rome with his older sister Amalia. In a theatre he sees a mysterious woman and, following her into the wardrobe room, they make love. She is Giulia, who lives in Ostia and is trying to make a career as a photographic model. Following a disordered life, including many men, she has little appetite for an affair with Emilio, whose interest in her is obsessive, but does meet him from time to time and they make love.

Amalia is jealous of Emilio's infatuation and, when a younger and more successful writer called Stefano visits the apartment, starts an affair with him. Emilio is outraged that his sister is having wild sex under his roof and breaks up the romance.

As his eyes slowly open to the true nature of Giulia and the people she mixes with, he decides to transform her into the person he wants her to be but this project, as could have been predicted, fails. His sister, deprived of her brother's affection and her one chance of love, commits suicide.

== Cast ==
- Serena Grandi: Giulia
- Johan Leysen: Emilio
- Valeria D'Obici: Amalia
- Sergio Rubini: Stefano
- Massimo Sarchielli
- Giuliana Calandra
