= Careless (film) =

1962 film

Senilità
- Film poster of the French edition
- Directed by: Mauro Bolognini
- Written by: Mauro Bolognini; Goffredo Parise; Tullio Pinelli
- Starring: Claudia Cardinale; Anthony Franciosa
- Cinematography: Armando Nannuzzi
- Edited by: Nino Baragli
- Music by: Piero Piccioni
- Distributed by: Variety Distribution
- Release date: 1962
- Country: Italy
- Language: Italian

Senilità (released in North America as Careless) is a 1962 Italian film directed by Mauro Bolognini. It stars Claudia Cardinale and Anthony Franciosa, and is based on the novel Senilità by Italo Svevo.

== Plot ==
Approaching 40, Emilio, has lived among ideas and books, and is looking for a short-term relationship with no responsibilities. He seeks to emulate his friend Stefano (a successful womanizer) and tales of adventure that he has read about in books, but not experienced.

He meets the younger Angiolina, a beautiful and vivacious lady, whom he perceives as free and innocent. He will educate her in the ways of the world and reduce her naivety.

He happily tells his sister, Amalia, with whom he lives, of the encounter. She tells him not to do anything stupid, and asks if the lady is honest.

A colleague drops hints that Angiolina may not be quite the "little angel" that her name suggests. Photos in her home also suggest that she has known a number of men previously. Progressive observations of Angiolina, around Trieste, reveal her with multiple men.

During a trip to a restaurant, Angiolina also develops an instant rapport with Stefano, and he persuades her to pose for him ("dressed") in his work as a sculptor.

Meanwhile, his sister Amalia develops an infatuation with the talented Stefano. When Emilio stops Stefano from seeing her any more, it leads to tragic consequences...

== Cast ==
- Anthony Franciosa: Emilio Brentani
- Claudia Cardinale: Angiolina Zarri
- Betsy Blair: Amalia Brentani
- Philippe Leroy: Stefano Balli
- Raimondo Magni: Visentini
- Aldo Bufi Landi: Soriani

== Accolades ==
- 1962 – San Sebastián International film festival
  - Concha de Plata fot Best Director: Mauro Bolognini
- 1963 – Nastro d'argento
  - Best Costumes: Piero Tosi
  - Best Scenography: Luigi Scaccianoce

== Legacy ==
A 2009 documentary, Senilità – Da Italo Svevo a Mauro Bolognini, "aims to revive those days 50 years ago, through the memories of those who participated or only attended the filming of the movie".

A 2019 Bolognini retrospective at the French Cinémathèque recalled that the film is a good example of how the filmmaker was "exceptional at directing actors".
