= Senilità =

1898 novel by Italo Svevo

Senilità (Senility)
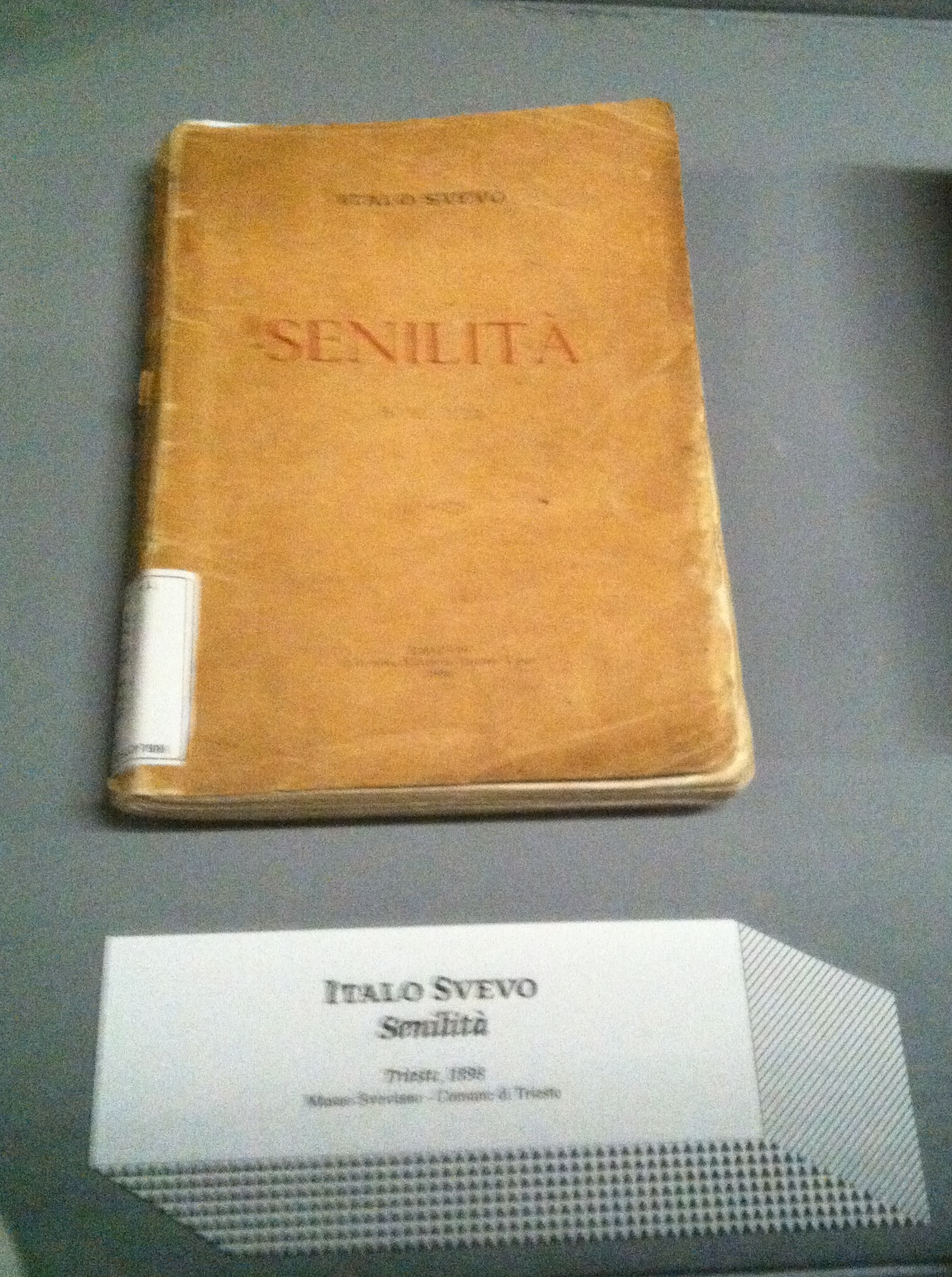
- First edition of Senilità
- Author: Italo Svevo
- Language: Italian
- Genre: novel
- Published: 1898
- Publication place: Italy

Senilità, translated into English as As a Man Grows Older or Emilio's Carnival, is Italo Svevo's second novel, first published in 1898. The novel's protagonist is Emilio Brentani, a failed writer torn between his longing for love and pleasure and his regret for not enjoying either.

In the novel, Svevo addresses the problems of ineptitude and of the inability on the part of the protagonist to manage his own inner, sentimental life. The indecisiveness and inaction with which Emilio deals with affairs in his life lead him to shut out his memories, leaving him in a state of spiritual old age (hence the title "Senility").

The story was adapted into the 1962 film Careless, directed by Mauro Bolognini. and again in 1986 by Andrea Barzini as Desiderando Giulia.

== Characters ==
- Emilio Brentani, 35, is a failed Triestine bachelor intellectual, lost in the small victory of having written a novel. He works as a clerk in an insurance company. It is not often that a person is conscious of his own limitations, forced by fate to accept a role below that which is desired. His ineptitude puts him constantly on the losing side.
- Amalia, Emilio's sister, a spinster; after all, her name mirrors that of her brother (Amilia versus Emilio).
- Stefano Balli, sculptor: Emilio considers Balli his best friend, an alter ego. It is true that the two spend a lot of time together, but in reality Balli is a person quite different from Emilio: a stronger personality, Stefano clearly stands out from his friend with his efficiency and energy.
- Angiolina Zarri: Angiolina, Emilio's mistress, is an exuberant person with a turbulent love life. Of all the characters, she is the only one capable of realizing herself without too many scruples. She, along with Balli, constitutes the "healthy" center in the quartet of protagonists.

== Plot ==
Emilio, a clerk from an insurance company who is a failed writer, lives a modest life in a shared apartment with his sister Amalia, a spinster who has few relationships with the outside world, whose life consists mainly of taking care of her bachelor brother.

At the start of the novel Emilio meets Angiolina, a vulgar, poor but beautiful woman, and falls in love with her, causing him to neglect his sister and his sculptor friend Stefano Balli. Balli has managed to balance his moderate artistic recognition with his successes with women, unlike Emilio, who is now eager for a brief amorous relationship himself. Emilio tries to explain to Angiolina that their relationship will be subordinate to his other duties, such as those with his own family. In short, he wants to keep the relationship unofficial, and for both parties not to be too committed.

Balli, who does not believe in love, tries to convince Emilio to simply have fun with Angiolina, known throughout Trieste as a loose woman. Emilio ends up, instead, opening his heart to this woman, and falls deep under her spell, despite knowing that she is at heart promiscuous. He imagines transforming Angiolina through his education. Balli is interested in Angiolina as his model for a sculpture, but Emilio keeps imagining the two being unfaithful to him. Balli tries to warn Emilio from being too committed: Angiolina, he says, is seen consorting with an umbrella maker and is soon harboring amorous interest for Balli himself. The revelation pains Emilio; ironically since, as indicated at the beginning of the novel, their initial agreement was for Emilio and Angiolina to have a non-committed relationship. He breaks off with Angiolina briefly, but soon finds himself searching her out for another tryst.

Balli, meanwhile, starts to frequent Emilio's house with great regularity. In another ironic twist, Emilio's sister Amalia falls for Balli. His masculine charm thus draws in both female protagonists. Emilio, jealous of Balli, becomes progressively estranged from his sculptor friend, and Amalia, knowing that her secret love is hopeless, numbs herself with ether. She ultimately becomes ill with pneumonia (Amalia's attitude to death is similar to the suicide of Alfonso Nitti, protagonist of Svevo's first novel Una Vita, "A Life".) The illness leads to her death, but not after triggering the grave remorse of her negligent brother.

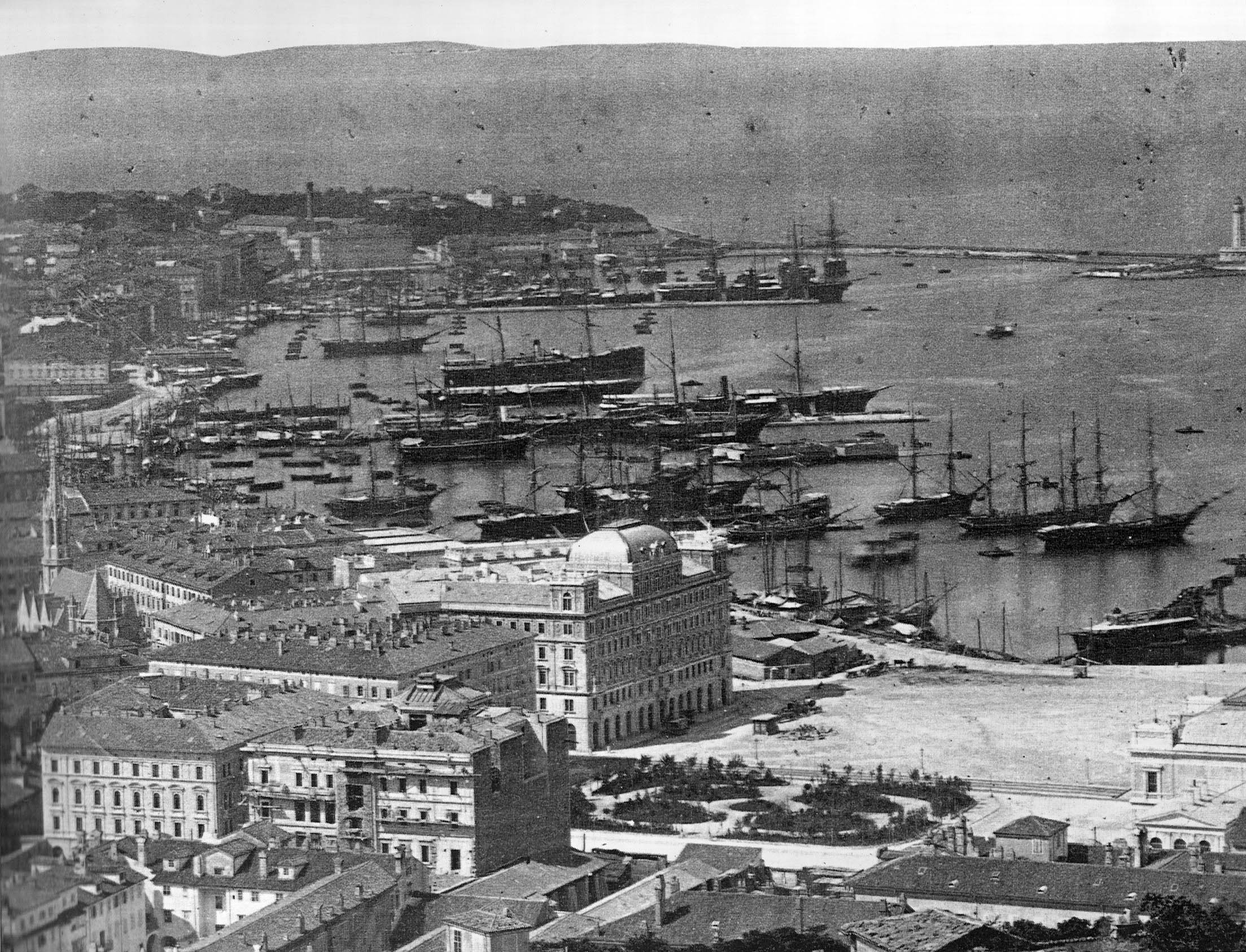
Trieste at the end of the nineteenth century

After Amalia's death, Emilio finally decides to make a clean break with Angiolina, despite his own obsessive love of her, and also with Balli. It is then that we learn that Angiolina has run off with a bank cashier to the capital of the Empire, Vienna. The novel ends with a meaningful but poignant image: years later, in memory of this special moment of his life, Emilio begins to merge these two women into a single person – an idealized woman with the beauty of his mistress Angiolina but with the pious heart of his dead sister Amalia.

== Appreciation and reception ==
Greatly appreciated by James Joyce, who strove for the publication of the second edition, the novel approaches the style of the Irish writer in that it is essentially introspective and aims to shed light on the inner life of the protagonist Emilio. The first edition was published without much fanfare, and it was only after the intervention of Joyce that the novel began receiving the attention that it deserves. It is now considered a classic of Italian literature, with some critics like Joyce, Valery Larbaud and Eugenio Montale, admiring it even more than his later and more famous novel, La coscienza di Zeno.

Svevo's working title for the novel was Il carnevale di Emilio ("Emilio's Carnival"); he later changed it to Senilità. The English translation of this revised title, as suggested by Joyce, was As a Man Grows Older.

Emilio's ineptitude is ruthlessly laid bare by the narrator, who sees the protagonist as a person who is in a sense ill and, ultimately, even senile. The reader is drawn into this complicity with the narrator, and gradually recognizes Emilio's limitations and inadequacies. Angiolina's character is seen almost entirely from the eyes of the two male characters and is constantly evolving in Emilio's eyes. At first he considers her an angel and gives her the improbable nickname of "Ange"; later, however, the girl is called "Giolina" by Balli because of her vulgar stature.

== English Translations ==
- As a Man Grows Older, translated by Beryl de Zoete, 1932. Reprinted by New York Review Books, 2001
- Emilio's Carnival, translated by Beth Archer Brombert, Yale University Press, 2001

== Editions ==
- Italo Svevo, Senilità (Senility), in Italo Svevo, Romanzi, compiled by i Meridiani, edited by Arnaldo Mandori, introduction by Pietro Sarzano (1985), pp. 1231, LII.
