= Deutsche Schule Genua =

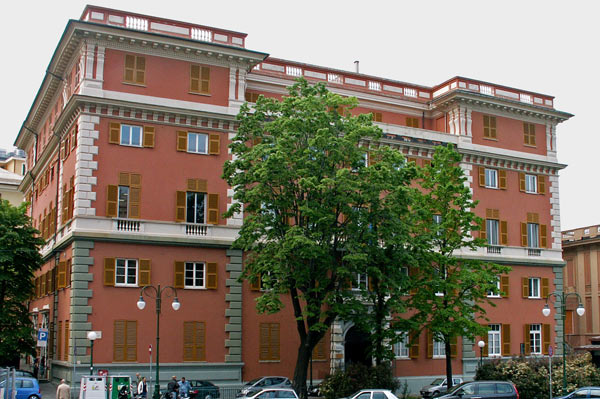

Location
- Genoa; Italy
- Coordinates: 44.4048°N 8.9407°E

Information
- Type: German international school
- Grades: Kindergarten through gymnasium
- Website: scuolagermanica.it

Deutsche Schule Genua (Italian: Scuola Germanica di Genova; "German School of Genoa") is a German international school in Genoa, Italy. The school serves kindergarten through gymnasium.

== See also ==
German international schools in Italy:

- German School of Milan
- Deutsche Schule Rom

Italian international schools in Germany:

- Liceo Italo Svevo
- Papst-Johannes XXIII-Schule
