= German School of Milan =

Private bilingual school in Milan, Italy

Coordinates: 45°28′29.4″N 9°10′54.29″E

- Deutsche Schule Mailand

Location
- Via Legnano 24; Milan, 20121; Italy

Information
- Other name: Scuola Germanica di Milano; DSM
- Type: Private, bilingual German School Abroad
- Established: 1886
- Oversight: Central Agency for Schools Abroad (ZfA); KMK
- Director: Dr. Stefan Illig
- Grades: Kindergarten–12
- Language: German, Italian
- Website: dsmailand.it

The German School of Milan (German: Deutsche Schule Mailand, DSM; Italian: Scuola Germanica di Milano), founded in 1886, is an international institution located in Milan, Italy.

It is one of the three German schools in Italy, the other two based in Rome and Genoa, in which subjects are taught in both German and Italian.

It follows the German educational program from preschool to secondary school, finally leading to graduation with both the German Abitur and the Italian maturità scientifica.

== History ==
The German School of Milan was founded in 1886 as an educational centre for children of German businessmen living in northern Italy. Due to the drastic historical events of the early 20th century, its address changed numerous times. Its current location, close to the historical centre of Milan, was set in 1957 with great acclaim for its bilingual nature.

In the seventies, the school and the Italian government established an educational curriculum which integrates subjects taught in Italian in to the existing program in order to recognize graduates from this school as students of a governmental "liceo scientifico". This grants them access to universities in both Italy and Germany.

The main building of the school underwent reconstruction and a new building was established for the Kindergarten and other facilities. The expansion of the school was completed and inaugurated in December 2007.

== Curriculum and qualifications ==
The school follows the German state curriculum across three stages: Kindergarten, primary school (Grundschule, grades 1–4) and Gymnasium (grades 5–12). Italian is taught from grade 1 and English from grade 3, with French or Latin added in the upper grades. The Gymnasium concludes with the German Abitur, taken after the Qualifikationsphase (grades 11–12), which is recognised for university admission in both Germany and Italy.

As a German School Abroad (Deutsche Auslandsschule), the school is supervised by Germany's Central Agency for Schools Abroad (ZfA) and the Conference of Education Ministers (KMK). It holds the ZfA quality seal Exzellente Deutsche Auslandsschule ("Excellent German School Abroad") and participates in the Erasmus+ programme.

== Alumni ==
- Luciana Giussani, creator of the Diabolik comics.
- Lutz Konermann, director of films and TV Series in Germany and Switzerland
- Andrea Superti-Furga, Professor of Pediatrics and Genetics at the University of Lausanne and head of the Division of Genetic Medicine at the Lausanne University Hospital
- Giulio Superti-Furga, Scientific Director of the Research Center for Molecular Medicine of the Austrian Academy of Sciences

== See also ==
- Milan
- International School of Milan
- Lycée Stendhal de Milan
- German School of Athens

Italian international schools in Germany:

- Liceo Italo Svevo
- Papst-Johannes XXIII-Schule
