= Cousin syndrome =

Genetic disorder

- Symptoms: Short stature Skeletal malformations Hearing loss
- Usual onset: Congenital
- Causes: Biallelic variants in TBX15

Cousin syndrome is a genetic condition characterized by short stature at birth, a short neck with low-positioned external ears, as well as congenital malformations of the skeletal system affecting the shoulders, the pelvis, the neck, and the limbs (MIM number 260660). The condition determines physical disability, particularly affecting deambulation, and hearing loss while intelligence is not affected.

The condition was originally described in 1982 by Jacques Cousin, physician in Lilles, France, and colleagues as "familial pelvi-scapular dysplasia with dwarfism and dysmorphisms". Some sporadic patients reported in the medical literature as "pelvic-shoulder dysplasia" or similar diagnoses may in fact have had Cousin syndrome. In 2008, the group of Andrea Superti-Furga showed that the condition was caused by biallelic inactivating variants in the gene coding for the T-box transcription factor, TBX15. They also proposed to name the condition "Cousin syndrome" because the name "pelviscapular dysplasia" is too restrictive. The incidence of the condition is not known but it seems to be very rare, with only a single further molecularly confirmed individual reported in 2015. An important differential diagnosis in the newborn and infant is campomelic dysplasia, where hypoplasia of the scapulae and of the iliac bones with femoral dislocation may also occur. Campomelic dysplasia, caused by monoallelic variants in and around the SOX9 gene, is less rare than Cousin syndrome.
