= Benjamin Crémieux =

French literary critic and writer (1888–1944)

Dr Benjamin Crémieux
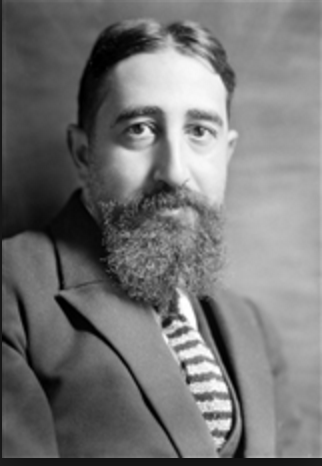
- Born: 1 December 1888; Narbonne, France
- Died: 14 April 1944 (aged 55); Buchenwald concentration camp, Germany
- Education: Sorbonne, PhD, 1928
- Occupations: Writer, critic and historian

Benjamin Crémieux (1888–1944) was a French author, critic and literary historian.

== Early life ==
Crémieux was born to a Jewish family in Narbonne, France in 1888. His family had long ties in the region, having 'settled in France as early as the 14th century'.^{:452}

== Military service ==
He fought in World War I during his obligatory military service in the French Army and was severely wounded during battle.^{:452} After the war he focused on studying Italian literature and history.^{:452}

== Career ==
Crémieux contributed to a variety of literary magazines and journals, including La Gazette du Franc,^{:270} and the influential literary journal Nouvelle Revue Française (NRF). He started writing for the NRF in 1920 and Jean Paulhan invited him to be a member of the journal's editorial committee as early as 1926.^{:22}

In 1928 he defended his doctoral thesis Essai Sur l'évolution littéraire de l'Italie de 1870 á nos jours at the Sorbonne, which was published later that year.^{:41} He published one of his most important texts in 1931, Inquiétude et Reconstruction, which provided a survey of French literature since the turn of the century.^{:139}

He also served in a variety of service roles. He was 'chief of the Italian bureau of the French Ministry of Foreign Affairs'^{:41} and the permanent secretary of the French section of the PEN Club.^{:139}

In 1940, Crémieux joined the French underground and became a leader of the Maquis.

== Death ==
In April 1943, two Gestapo agents detained Crémieux in Marseilles.^{:458} He was arrested, imprisoned, and deported to Nazi Germany, where, in April 1944 he was executed in the Buchenwald concentration camp.^{:458.}

== Legacy ==
Crémieux introduced a number of important literary figures to the French public through his translations, including Luigi Pirandello and Italo Svevo;^{:138} he was also an early champion of the works of Marcel Proust.
