= Zeno's Conscience =

1923 novel by Italo Svevo

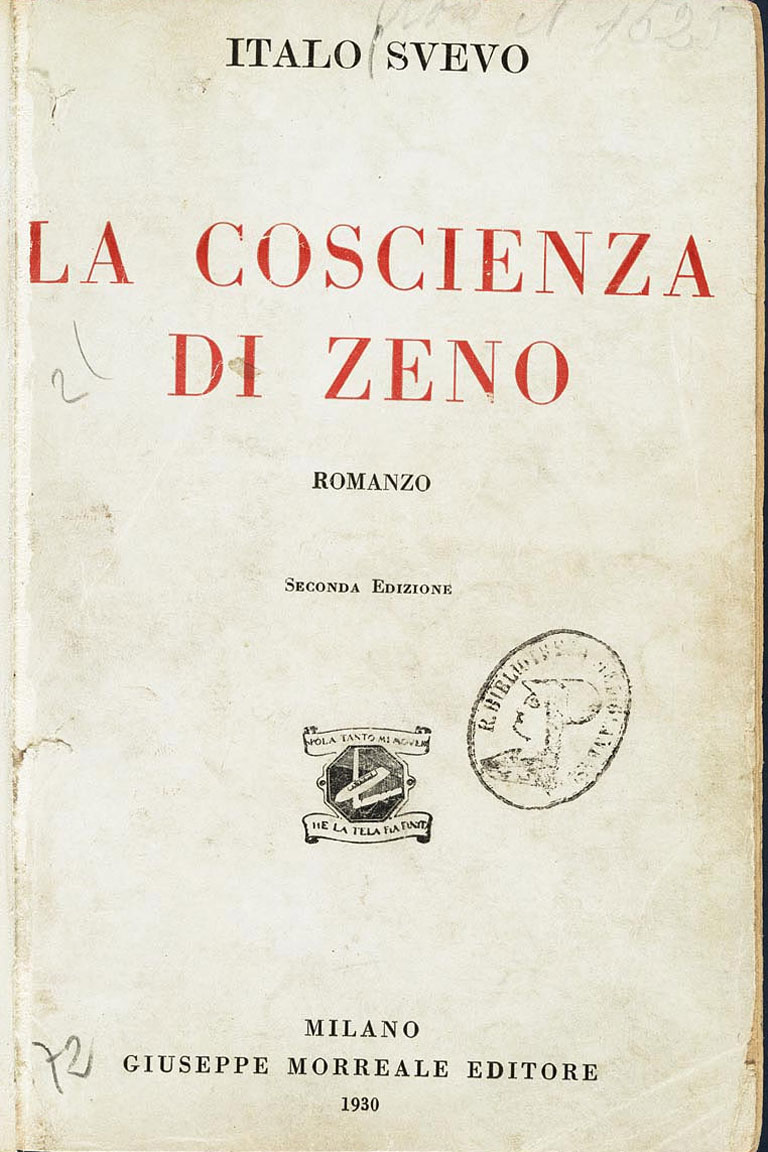
- Title page of the second edition of La coscienza di Zeno (1930)
- Author: Italo Svevo
- Original title: La coscienza di Zeno
- Translator: Beryl de Zoete
- Genre: modernist novel
- Published: 1923 (L. Cappelli Editore) (Italian)
- English publication date: 1930 (US: Alfred A. Knopf | UK: Putnam)

Zeno's Conscience (Italian: La coscienza di Zeno [la koʃˈʃɛntsa di dˈdzɛːno]) is a novel by Italian writer Italo Svevo. The main character is Zeno Cosini, and the book is the fictional character's memoir. He keeps it because his psychoanalyst recommended that he do so in order to overcome his illness, and particularly his smoking habit. He writes about his father, his business, his wife, and his tobacco habit. The original English translation was published under the title Confessions of Zeno.

== Reception and analysis ==
Discussions of the book often focus on its ambivalent treatment of psychoanalysis. Brian Moloney examined the relationship between psychoanalysis and irony in the novel. Gabriele Antonini traced passages that rework material from Freud and the parallels between Zeno and Oedipus. James Wood identifies as the book's central joke that Zeno believes he is analyzing himself while resisting formal analysis, a joke that culminates in his rejection of the Oedipus complex diagnosis on the grounds that he has not been cured of it.

== Comparison to other works ==
Svevo's first two novels, Una vita and Senilità, were ignored by critics and the public. After a period of literary silence, Svevo self-published this novel, which is quite different in style from his first two works, in 1923. It was appreciated by a close friend of Svevo's, James Joyce, who presented the book to two French critics, Valery Larbaud and Benjamin Crémieux. The success of the novel expanded to Italy, thanks to the poet Eugenio Montale.

The previous novels follow a naturalistic model; Zeno's Conscience, instead, is narrated in the first person, and is focused entirely on the character's thoughts and feelings. Moreover, Zeno is an unreliable narrator, since in the very first page his doctor, publishing the diary, says that it is made of truths and lies. However, there are important similarities among Svevo's three novels. Even in the third-person narrative of Una vita and Senilità, the reader knows only the point of view of the main characters; and these are, or feel, unfit to live. The titles are revealing: Una vita had previously the title Un inetto (An unfit); Senilità (literally Senility) is a state of mind, a feeling of weakness in front of everyday life events and encounters. As to La coscienza di Zeno, the title's ambiguity causes the different ways it is translated not only into English, but also into German (Zenos Gewissen, Zenos Bewusstsein). Zeno talks of his various failures, of his feeling ill and looking for a cure he'll never find. In the end, however, he recognizes that life itself is an illness, and it always brings to death.

== Plot summary ==
The novel is presented as a memoir that Zeno Cosini has written at the suggestion of his psychoanalyst, Dr. S. Dr. S proceeds to publish it out of spite after Zeno abandons treatment, warning in a preface that it contains both truths and lies. The memoir is arranged in thematic chapters rather than chronologically.

Zeno begins by recounting his lifelong addiction to smoking. From the age of twenty he repeatedly resolves to smoke his "last cigarette", choosing significant or numerically harmonious dates on which to quit, consulting doctors and, at one point, even committing himself to a clinic, from which he escapes. Every attempt fails.

He then describes the death of his father, a serious man with whom he has little in common. As Zeno tries, on the doctor's orders, to keep the dying man in bed, his father rises and his hand strikes Zeno across the face just before he dies. For decades afterwards Zeno cannot decide whether the blow was a final punishment or an involuntary movement.

Entering business, Zeno attaches himself to the merchant Giovanni Malfenti and sets out to court his beautiful daughter Ada. Ada prefers the handsome, Tuscan-speaking Guido Speier, and in a single evening Zeno proposes to Ada, then to her sister Alberta, and finally to Augusta, the plain sister he had dismissed, who accepts because she loves him. The marriage proves happier than he expected, but Zeno begins an affair with Carla, a poor aspiring singer. It ends when Carla, wanting to see his wife, is steered towards Ada instead, mistakes her for Zeno's wife, and is moved by her to break off the relationship.

Zeno then joins Guido in a trading firm in Trieste, which Guido mismanages. Guido's marriage falters as Ada's health and beauty are ruined by Basedow's disease. After a staged suicide attempt wins back Ada's sympathy, Guido loses heavily on the stock exchange and stages a second one, which kills him. Zeno misses the funeral because he is speculating with Guido's money, recovering three quarters of the losses.

The final chapter is set during the First World War. It finds Zeno consulting doctors about imagined ailments. He rejects one doctor's diagnosis of an Oedipus complex. When Italy enters the war in May 1915, the front line separates him from his family, who are on holiday near the Isonzo. He returns alone to Trieste, where he grows rich through speculation. In his last entry, in March 1916, he declares himself cured and concludes that life itself resembles an illness that always ends in death. He imagines a man inventing an explosive of unprecedented power, and another stealing it and blowing up the earth, freeing it of sickness.

== See also ==
- Unreliable narrator
