= GBX2 =

Protein-coding gene in the species Homo sapiens

Identifiers
- Aliases: GBX2, gastrulation brain homeobox 2
- External IDs: OMIM: 601135; MGI: 95668; GeneCards: GBX2

Gene location (Human)
Chr.	Chromosome 2 (human)
Band	2q37.2	Start	236,165,236 bp
Band	2q37.2	End	236,168,386 bp

Gene location (Mouse)
Chr.	Chromosome 1 (mouse)
Band	1 D|1 45.06 cM	Start	89,855,678 bp
Band	1 D|1 45.06 cM	End	89,858,901 bp
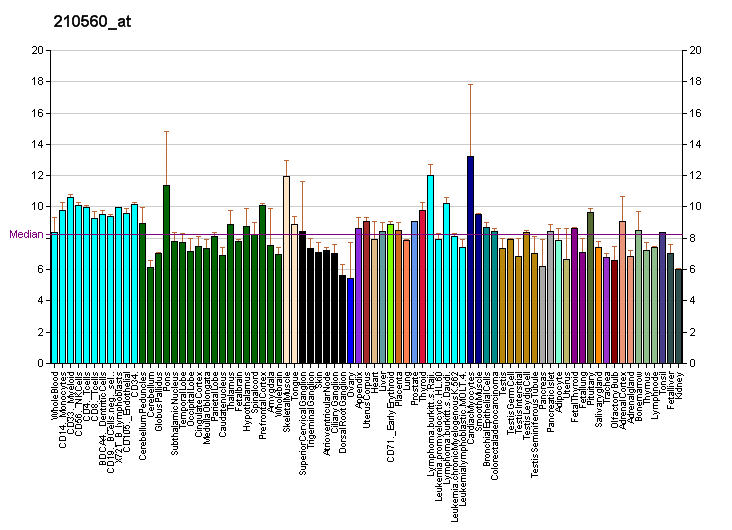
RNA expression pattern
Bgee	Human / Mouse (ortholog); Top expressed in: gonad; testicle; putamen; stromal cell of endometrium; caudate nucleus; C1 segment; hypothalamus; nucleus accumbens; substantia nigra; right hemisphere of cerebellum / Top expressed in: zygote; primary oocyte; medial dorsal nucleus; tail of embryo; primitive streak; secondary oocyte; medial geniculate nucleus; otic vesicle; embryo; lumbar subsegment of spinal cord; More reference expression data
BioGPS	More reference expression data
Gene ontology
Molecular function	DNA binding; sequence-specific DNA binding; RNA polymerase II transcription regulatory region sequence-specific DNA binding; DNA-binding transcription factor activity; RNA polymerase II core promoter sequence-specific DNA binding; DNA-binding transcription activator activity, RNA polymerase II-specific; DNA-binding transcription factor activity, RNA polymerase II-specific; transcription factor binding
Cellular component	nucleus
Biological process	autonomic nervous system development; midbrain-hindbrain boundary morphogenesis; regulation of transcription, DNA-templated; thalamus development; hindbrain development; transcription by RNA polymerase II; tube morphogenesis; transcription, DNA-templated; nervous system development; cerebellum development; cerebellar granule cell precursor proliferation; axon guidance; forebrain neuron development; midbrain-hindbrain boundary development; rhombomere 2 development; inner ear morphogenesis; neural crest cell migration; branching involved in blood vessel morphogenesis; cell population proliferation; positive regulation of transcription by RNA polymerase II; regulation of nervous system development
Sources:Amigo / QuickGO
Orthologs
Databases	NCBI: entry; OMA: entry
Species	Human	Mouse
Entrez	2637	14472
Ensembl	ENSG00000168505	ENSMUSG00000034486
UniProt	P52951	P48031
RefSeq (mRNA)	NM_001485; NM_001301687	NM_010262
RefSeq (protein)	NP_001288616; NP_001476	NP_034392
Location (UCSC)	Chr 2: 236.17 – 236.17 Mb	Chr 1: 89.86 – 89.86 Mb
PubMed search
- Wikidata
View/Edit Human	View/Edit Mouse

Homeobox protein GBX-2 is a protein that in humans is encoded by the GBX2 gene.

== Summary ==
Gastrulation Brain Homeobox 2, or commonly known as GBX2, is a type of transcription factor that aids in the arranging of the midbrain and hindbrain during gastrulation. The hindbrain is broken up into seven or eight rhombomeres during gastrulation and GBX2 is responsible for rhombomeres one through three. GBX2 also takes part in the signaling and expression of other genes. It has been said that there is a threshold requirement for the amount of GBX2, so what occurs depends on the amount expressed. For example, specific amounts of GBX2 is needed for regulating the anterior and posterior patterning in the hindbrain. If the specific threshold is not met, then the patterning does not occur. This is the case with the other genes it helps to express like FGF8. With every gene comes some diseases associated with it. Colon Small Cell Carcinoma and Optiz-Gbbb Syndrome, which causes abnormalities throughout the midline of the body, are the diseases most closely associated with the GBX2 gene.

== Function ==
Gastrulation Brain Homeobox 2 (GBX2) is a homeobox gene involved in the normal development of rhombomeres 1-3 which is the mid/hindbrain region. This gene is a dosage dependent transcription factor involved in the regulation of proper expression of other genes. GBX2 expression occurs during gastrulation and continues to be expressed in the later stages of embryogenesis. During these different stages, GBX2 is responsible for several important processes. In the neural plate stage GBX2 is required in order for the anterior hindbrain precursors to survive and form correctly. Also at this stage in development GBX2 is required for the proper regulation of different gene expression needed for the early establishment of A/P patterning in the neural plate. In the early stages of brain morphogenesis GBX2 is required for both the normal development of the anterior hindbrain and the proper formation of the mid/hindbrain organizer. Because of the effects on the mid/hindbrain organizer, GBX2 is involved in the positioning of the expression domain for isthmic FGF8. Since this is a dosage dependent gene, the different amounts of gene present in certain location can cause different outcomes. FGF8 is affected by the different dosages in the location it is expressed. The absence of GBX2 causes FGF8 expression is shifted caudally and over expression of GBX2 causes FGF8 expression to be shifted rostrally. Not all of the rhombomeres GBX2 is expressed in require the same strictness of dose regulation. Of the three, rhombomere 2 has the most strict dose requirements.

== Neural Crest Cell Development ==
The Gbx-2 gene is thought to be involved in neural crest cell patterning and differentiation during fetal growth as a transcription factor. As a zygote becomes a gastrula, the embryonic ectoderm differentiates into these neural crest cells, which give rise to many structures including muscle, neurons, and bone later in development. In order to test Gbx-2's role in neural crest cell development, the region of neural cell proliferation was injected with the morphogen Wnt8. In response, Snail2 was expressed, which led to transcription factor activation and subsequent protein formation. When Wnt8 was inhibited in the same region, no transcription factors were expressed and neural cell growth was inhibited or not seen. There have also been studies that showed that when the reverse occurred, with the absence or presence of Snail2 affecting Wnt8, similar effects to transcription factor activation occurred. Such research has shown that transcription factor activation is dependent on both genes. Wnt is thought to be a neural crest cell inducer, and Gbx-2 is one of the gene targets involved. In cases where Gbx-2 mRNA is in excess, an expansion of neural crest cells is seen, whereas when there is a lack of mRNA, neural crest cells fail to proliferate. If neural crest cells are unable to proliferate, many of the body's important organs and processes will be inhibited and could likely lead to miscarriage of the fetus.

== Animal studies ==
Knockout of the GBX2 gene causes the failure of many structures to form, such as the isthmic nuclei, the cerebellum, motor nerve V and many other derivatives of rhombomeres 1-3. GBX2 gene knockout embryos will continue to develop and will reach full term pregnancy. The babies are born but if there is a lack of GBX2 expression all will die soon after birth.

Knockdown of the gbx2 gene leads to a truncated anterior hindbrain as well as abnormal clusters of cell bodies in r2 and r3 which are associated with problems in cranial nerve V. It has been shown that any structures derived from r1-r3 will be adversely affected by mutations or deficiencies in gbx2. These structures include the aortic arch and right Subclavian artery which, when improperly developed, can lead to cardiovascular defects in addition to craniofacial defects from improper development of cranial nerve V.
