= SMARCD3 =

Human protein and coding gene

Identifiers
- Aliases: SMARCD3, BAF60C, CRACD3, Rsc6p, SWI/SNF related, matrix associated, actin dependent regulator of chromatin, subfamily d, member 3
- External IDs: OMIM: 601737; MGI: 1914243; GeneCards: SMARCD3

Gene location (Human)
Chr.	Chromosome 7 (human)
Band	7q36.1	Start	151,238,764 bp
Band	7q36.1	End	151,277,896 bp

Gene location (Mouse)
Chr.	Chromosome 5 (mouse)
Band	5|5 A3	Start	24,795,816 bp
Band	5|5 A3	End	24,829,409 bp
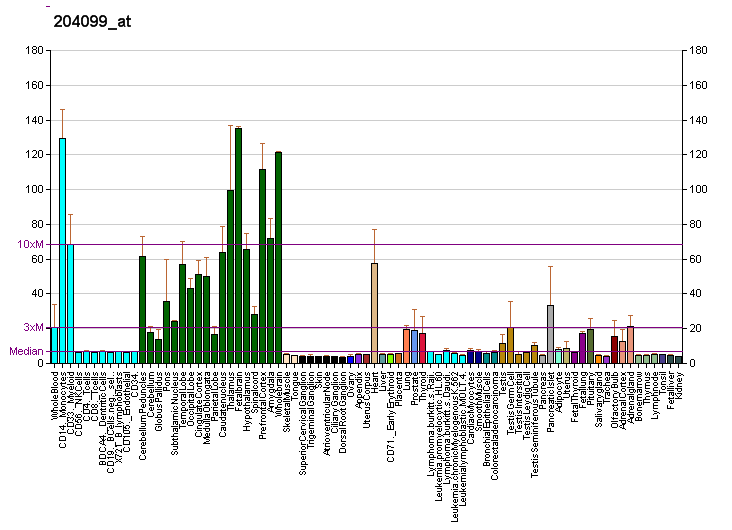
RNA expression pattern
Bgee	Human / Mouse (ortholog); Top expressed in: ganglionic eminence; nucleus accumbens; right hemisphere of cerebellum; right auricle of heart; anterior pituitary; right frontal lobe; anterior cingulate cortex; apex of heart; caudate nucleus; amygdala / Top expressed in: interventricular septum; muscle of thigh; internal carotid artery; triceps brachii muscle; skeletal muscle tissue; tunica media of zone of aorta; temporal muscle; gastrocnemius muscle; quadriceps femoris muscle; medial head of gastrocnemius muscle; More reference expression data
BioGPS	More reference expression data
Gene ontology
Molecular function	transcription coactivator activity; transcription factor binding; chromatin binding; protein binding; nuclear receptor binding; nuclear receptor coactivator activity; signaling receptor binding
Cellular component	cytoplasm; nBAF complex; nucleoplasm; npBAF complex; nucleus; SWI/SNF complex
Biological process	positive regulation of neuroblast proliferation; chromatin remodeling; regulation of transcription, DNA-templated; cardiac right ventricle formation; regulation of transcription by RNA polymerase II; heart morphogenesis; transcription, DNA-templated; nervous system development; positive regulation of transcription, DNA-templated; muscle cell differentiation; nucleosome disassembly; positive regulation of smooth muscle cell differentiation; positive regulation of G2/M transition of mitotic cell cycle; secondary heart field specification; regulation of protein binding; neural retina development; regulation of lipid metabolic process; chromatin organization; positive regulation of nucleic acid-templated transcription
Sources:Amigo / QuickGO
Orthologs
Databases	NCBI: entry; OMA: entry
Species	Human	Mouse
Entrez	6604	66993
Ensembl	ENSG00000082014	ENSMUSG00000028949
UniProt	Q6STE5	Q6P9Z1
RefSeq (mRNA)	NM_001003801; NM_001003802; NM_003078	NM_025891
RefSeq (protein)	NP_001003801; NP_001003802; NP_003069	NP_080167
Location (UCSC)	Chr 7: 151.24 – 151.28 Mb	Chr 5: 24.8 – 24.83 Mb
PubMed search
- Wikidata
View/Edit Human	View/Edit Mouse

SWI/SNF-related matrix-associated actin-dependent regulator of chromatin subfamily D member 3 is a protein that in humans is encoded by the SMARCD3 gene.

== Function ==
The protein encoded by this gene is a member of the SWI/SNF family of proteins, whose members display helicase and ATPase activities and which are thought to regulate transcription of certain genes by altering the chromatin structure around those genes. The encoded protein is part of the large ATP-dependent chromatin remodeling complex SNF/SWI and has sequence similarity to the yeast Swp73 protein.

Multiple alternatively spliced transcript variants have been found for this gene. Mutually exclusive incorporation of the variants into the larger SWI/SNF complex are thought to direct the complex to remodel particular sites in chromatin, leading to alterations in gene activity that dictate cell behavior or differentiation during development and disease.

SMARCD3 together with TBX15 triggers development glycolytic fast-twitch muscles by the activation of the Akt/PKB signaling pathway.
