= Liceo Italo Svevo =

International school in Cologne, Germany

Coordinates: 50.9532°N 6.9486°E

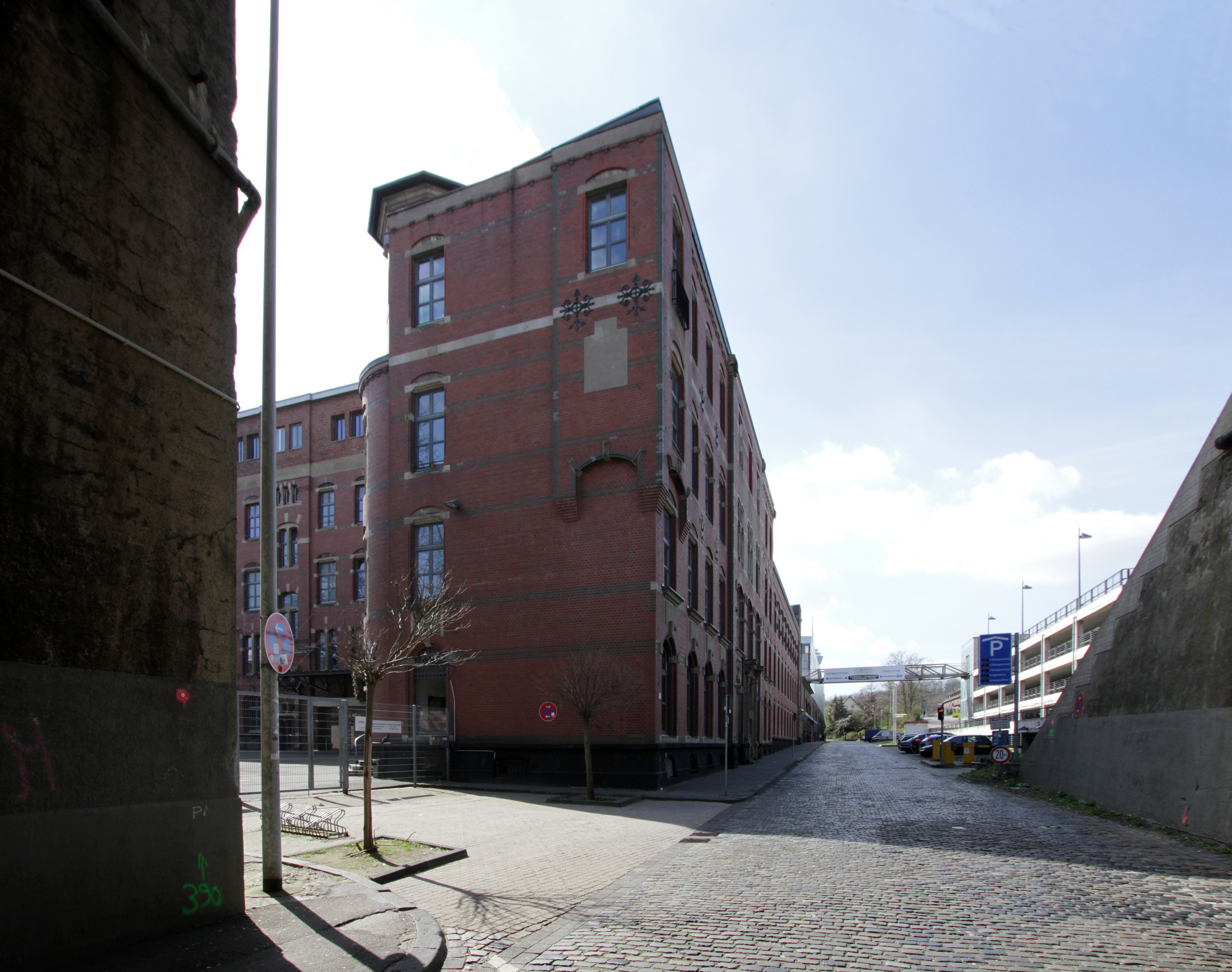
The building that housed the school

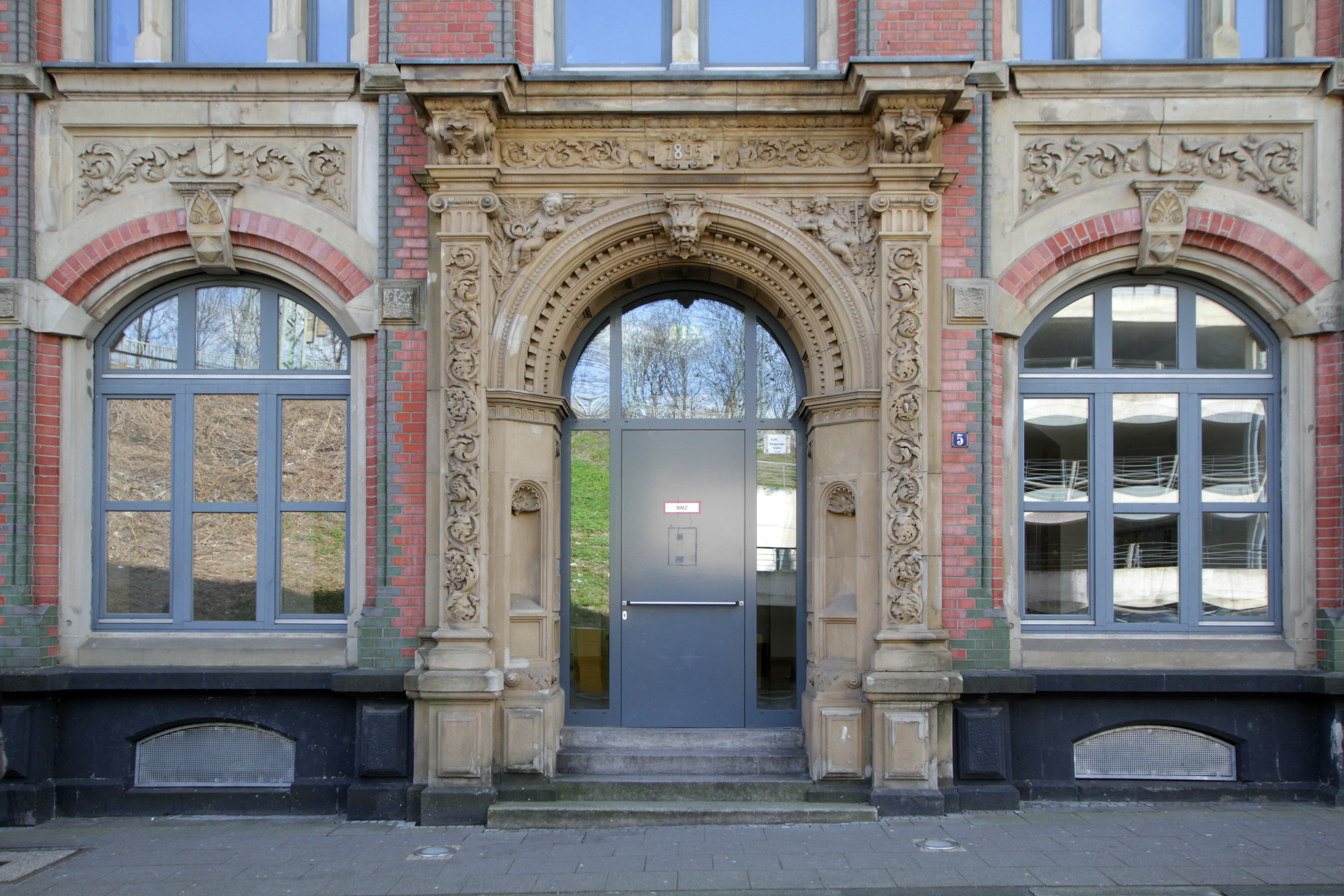
The building that housed the school

Liceo Italo Svevo or the Istituto Italo Svevo (German: Gymnasium Italo Svevo) was a private Italian international school in Cologne, Germany.

It was founded in 1997. The website states that it was the only Italian school in Germany. The school was closed in 2017 mainly because of financial problems.

== See also ==
German international schools in Italy:

- Deutsche Schule Rom
- German School of Milan
- Deutsche Schule Genua
