= Deutsche Schule Rom =

Coordinates: 41.8907°N 12.4265°E

- Via Aurelia Antica 397, Rome; Italy

Information
- Type: German international school
- Grades: Kindergarten through gymnasium
- Enrollment: 820
- Website: dsrome.de

Deutsche Schule Rom (DS Rom; Italian: Scuola Germanica Roma, lit. 'German School Rome') is a German international school in Rome, Italy. It serves levels kindergarten through gymnasium. It has currently about 820 pupils. The final exams are recognized in Germany, Austria and Italy. The DS Rom is located in Rome Via Aurelia Antica 397 west of Villa Doria Pamphili. It has a swimming hall and numerous sport-facilities. In the afternoon a rich program of sports and music is offered, i.a. a number of choirs, orchesters and also lessons for solo-musicians.

== Structure and lessons ==
The DS Rom offers classes from kindergarten up to abitur. It teaches in German, but some topics are taught in Italian to promote the bilingual character of the school. In grade 3 the DSR teaches English, in grade 6 pupils can choose between Latin or French.

== Organization and finance ==
The DS Rom is run by the "Deutsche Schulverein in Rom". The parents of the pupils are the members of the "Schulverein". It is financially supported by Germany, which also contributes teachers from Germany.

== See also ==
German international schools in Italy:

- Deutsche Schule Genua
- Deutsche Schule Mailand

Italian international schools in Germany:

- Liceo Italo Svevo
- Papst-Johannes-XXIII.-Schule
