= Andrea Barzini =

Italian film director

Andrea Barzini (born 14 December 1952) is an Italian film and television director, screenwriter and producer. He is the son of Italian journalist and politician Luigi Barzini Jr. and the father of Italian writer Chiara Barzini.

== Filmography ==
- Desiderando Giulia (1986)
- Italia-Germania 4-3 (1990)
- Volevamo essere gli U2 (1992)
- Passo a due (2005)

== Television ==
- Flipper (1983)
- Chiara e gli altri (1989)
- Il sassofono (1991)
- Hotel Alexandria (1999)
- Don Matteo (2001–2004)
- Io e mamma (2007)
- Capri (2007)
- Ho sposato uno sbirro (2010)
