= TBX15 =

Human protein and coding gene

Identifiers
- Aliases: TBX15, TBX14, T-box 15, T-box transcription factor 15
- External IDs: OMIM: 604127; MGI: 1277234; GeneCards: TBX15
Available structures
PDB	Ortholog search: PDBe RCSB
PDB	List of PDB id codes 4A04

Gene location (Human)
Chr.	Chromosome 1 (human)
Band	1p12	Start	118,883,046 bp
Band	1p12	End	118,989,556 bp

Gene location (Mouse)
Chr.	Chromosome 3 (mouse)
Band	3 F2.2|3 43.03 cM	Start	99,147,697 bp
Band	3 F2.2|3 43.03 cM	End	99,261,575 bp
RNA expression pattern
Bgee	Human / Mouse (ortholog); Top expressed in: gastrocnemius muscle; Skeletal muscle tissue of rectus abdominis; quadriceps femoris muscle; vastus lateralis muscle; tibialis anterior muscle; muscle of thigh; Skeletal muscle tissue of biceps brachii; tibia; deltoid muscle; Achilles tendon / Top expressed in: muscle of thigh; digastric muscle; temporal muscle; triceps brachii muscle; sternocleidomastoid muscle; extraocular muscle; ankle; vastus lateralis muscle; tibialis anterior muscle; masseter muscle; More reference expression data
BioGPS	n/a
Gene ontology
Molecular function	DNA-binding transcription factor activity; RNA polymerase II cis-regulatory region sequence-specific DNA binding; DNA binding; DNA-binding transcription repressor activity, RNA polymerase II-specific; transcription corepressor activity; protein binding; protein homodimerization activity; transcription cis-regulatory region binding; protein heterodimerization activity; DNA-binding transcription factor activity, RNA polymerase II-specific
Cellular component	Tle3-Aes complex; nucleus
Biological process	embryonic cranial skeleton morphogenesis; embryonic skeletal system morphogenesis; regulation of transcription, DNA-templated; negative regulation of transcription by RNA polymerase II; transcription, DNA-templated; negative regulation of nucleic acid-templated transcription; regulation of transcription by RNA polymerase II
Sources:Amigo / QuickGO
Orthologs
Databases	NCBI: entry; OMA: entry
Species	Human	Mouse
Entrez	6913	21384
Ensembl	ENSG00000092607	ENSMUSG00000027868
UniProt	Q96SF7	O70306
RefSeq (mRNA)	NM_152380; NM_001330677	NM_009323
RefSeq (protein)	NP_001317606; NP_689593	NP_033349
Location (UCSC)	Chr 1: 118.88 – 118.99 Mb	Chr 3: 99.15 – 99.26 Mb
PubMed search
- Wikidata
View/Edit Human	View/Edit Mouse

T-box transcription factor TBX15 is protein that is encoded in humans by the Tbx15 gene, mapped to Chromosome 3 in mice and Chromosome 1 in humans. Tbx15 is a transcription factor that plays a key role in embryonic development. Like other members of the T-box subfamily, Tbx15 is expressed in the notochord and primitive streak, where it assists with the formation and differentiation of the mesoderm. It is steadily downregulated after segmentation of the paraxial mesoderm.

Expression of the T-box overall is a requirement for an embryo to remain viable. Heterozygous T-null mutations in mice result in short tails and some defects in sacral vertebrae. Homozygous null embryos display extreme deformities with mesodermal development: the axis of the body is shortened, the notochord fails to form, and posterior somites never develop. Embryonic death occurs around 10 days due to the failure to form the allantois.

Tbx15 plays a relatively minor role within this family. Tbx15 plays a role in the development of the skeleton. it is mainly associated with the development of the limbs, spinal column, and head. In particular, Tbx15 is shown to influence the development of the scapula or shoulder blade. Tbx15 expression is also seen in limb buds, in the craniofacial region, and in the skin. Failure of expression results in Cousin Syndrome, a disorder characterized by defects in craniofacial development and malformation of the shoulder girdle.

The effects of Tbx15 are also demonstrated in regulation of adipocyte differentiation, positional regulation of the dorsolateral mesenchyme, and growth of mitochondria. Tbx15, together with SMARCD3, triggers development glycolytic fast-twitch muscles by the activation of the Akt/PKB signaling pathway.

== Effects on embryonic development ==
The most notable effect of Tbx15 is its role in skeletal development. Tbx15 null mutant mice display prominent issues with skeletal development as prehypertrophic chondrocytes and mesenchymal precursor cells fail to proliferate as expected. Cartilaginous templates are reduced, with delays in ossification later in fetal development. This results in reduced bone size as well as alterations to the bone shape. In the forelimb, the central region of the scapular blade never forms, resulting in a hole through the scapula itself.

Tbx15 appears to play a synergistic role with Gli3 and Alx4 in the formation of the skeletal features of the shoulder girdle, with more pronounced malformations seen in cases where multiple mutations arise. Most likely, this reflects Tbx15's role in positional guidance of progenitor cells. Tbx18 is closely related to Tbx15, and it is generally co-expressed with Tbx15 in the core of the limb bud. However, Tbx18 null mice express no limb defects unless Pax3 is deactivated as well.

Tbx15 mutations can present in mice as irregular skin or fur color. This is due to a regulatory role in the correct expression of Agouti.When deactivated, Agouti expression is displaced dorsally. This reflects Tbx15's role in determining the limb dorsoventral boundary during early fetal development rather than any direct influence on the ectoderm. It helps to regulate the differentiation of the dorsolateral mesenchyme, which in turn is used to later determine the position and identity of the dorsal dermis.

In-utero methylation of Tbx15 plays a role in overall fetal growth, with hypomethylation having a demonstrable effect on placental functioning. Vascular intrauterine growth restriction follows, and it may have a correlation with increased rates of preeclampsia. Tbx15 also down-regulates the mass of mitochondria and the rate of basal mitochondrial expression, with both decreasing significantly if the gene is overexpressed.

Tbx15 plays a role in adipocyte differentiation, with 260-fold higher expression in subcutaneous preadipocytes than epididymal (visceral) preadipocytes. Overexpression of Tbz15 can lead to impaired differentiation and abnormally low levels of triglycerides. Crucially, Tbx15 is selectively expressed in brown and "brite" adipose tissue. Knockdown organisms show no change in white adipocytes, but do display reduced expression of the marker genes directly involved in brown adipocyte expression.

Tbx15 is noteworthy as a potential marker for cancer, with overexpression being correlated to reduced apoptosis in cancer cells.

== Clinical significance ==
Biallelic inactivating variants of the TBX15 gene can cause a recessively inherited condition called Cousin Syndrome. The mutation results in early truncation of the protein, which causes a string of missense amino acids. The resulting protein still has an intact T-box and is still capable of binding to the target DNA sequence in vitro, but it degrades quickly. This condition is associated with short stature, head and facial deformities, and underdevelopment of the shoulder blade and pelvis.

Cousin Syndrome has an equivalent disorder in mice, known as droopy ear; the same mutation of the Tbx15 gene is seen in both species. Droopy ear also results in craniofacial malformations, most abnormal placement and development of the ear. Droopy ear is also associated with abnormal skin color characteristics in mice due to the role of Tbx15's role in establishment of dorsoventral patterning of skin and fur color.
