= NANS =

Protein-coding gene in the species Homo sapiens

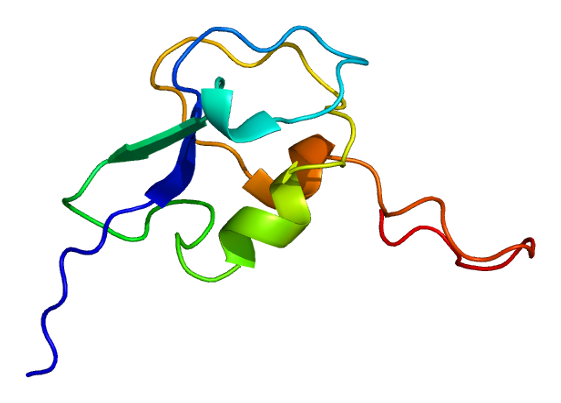
Available structures
PDB	Ortholog search: PDBe RCSB
PDB	List of PDB id codes 1WVO

Identifiers
- Aliases: NANS, HEL-S-100, SAS, N-acetylneuraminate synthase, SEMDG, SEMDCG
- External IDs: OMIM: 605202; MGI: 2149820; HomoloGene: 10343; GeneCards: NANS; OMA:NANS - orthologs
- EC number: 2.5.1.57

Gene location (Human)
Chr.	Chromosome 9 (human)
Band	9q22.33	Start	98,056,732 bp
Band	9q22.33	End	98,083,077 bp

Gene location (Mouse)
Chr.	Chromosome 4 (mouse)
Band	4|4 B1	Start	46,489,248 bp
Band	4|4 B1	End	46,503,632 bp
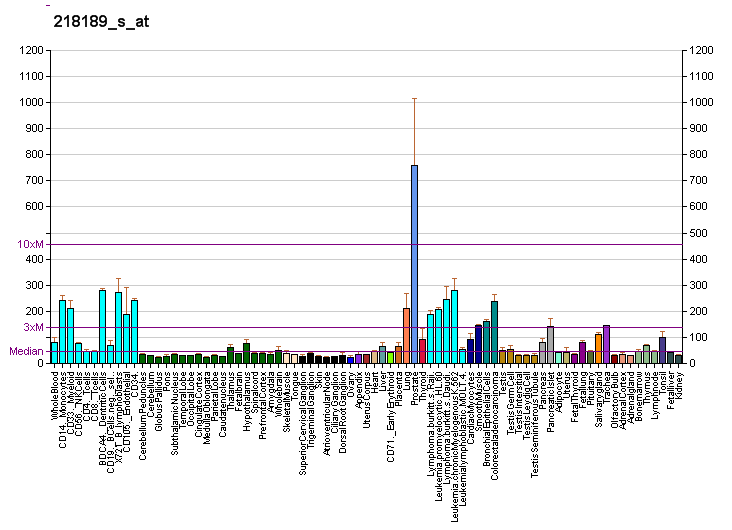
RNA expression pattern
Bgee	Human / Mouse (ortholog); Top expressed in: mucosa of sigmoid colon; mucosa of transverse colon; rectum; epithelium of nasopharynx; olfactory zone of nasal mucosa; palpebral conjunctiva; parotid gland; prostate; trachea; bronchial epithelial cell / Top expressed in: left colon; submandibular gland; lacrimal gland; seminal vesicula; basilar part of occipital bone; parotid gland; crypt of lieberkuhn of small intestine; prostate; endothelial cell of lymphatic vessel; internal carotid artery; More reference expression data
BioGPS	More reference expression data
Gene ontology
Molecular function	N-acetylneuraminate synthase activity; transferase activity; catalytic activity; N-acylneuraminate cytidylyltransferase activity; N-acylneuraminate-9-phosphate synthase activity
Cellular component	cytoplasm; cytosol; extracellular exosome
Biological process	carbohydrate biosynthetic process; CMP-N-acetylneuraminate biosynthetic process
Sources:Amigo / QuickGO
Orthologs
Species	Human	Mouse
Entrez	54187	94181
Ensembl	ENSG00000095380	ENSMUSG00000028334
UniProt	Q9NR45; Q5TBR0	Q99J77
RefSeq (mRNA)	NM_018946	NM_053179
RefSeq (protein)	NP_061819	NP_444409
Location (UCSC)	Chr 9: 98.06 – 98.08 Mb	Chr 4: 46.49 – 46.5 Mb
PubMed search
- Wikidata
View/Edit Human	View/Edit Mouse

Sialic acid synthase is an enzyme that in humans is encoded by the NANS gene.

This gene encodes an enzyme that functions in the biosynthetic pathways of sialic acids. In vitro, the encoded protein uses N-acetylmannosamine 6-phosphate and mannose 6-phosphate as substrates to generate phosphorylated forms of N-acetylneuraminic acid (Neu5Ac) and 2-keto-3-deoxy-D-glycero-D-galacto-nononic acid (KDN), respectively. However, it exhibits much higher activity toward the Neu5Ac phosphate product. In insect cells, expression of this gene results in Neu5Ac and KDN production. This gene is related to the E. coli sialic acid synthase gene neuB, and it can partially restore sialic acid synthase activity in an E. coli neuB-negative mutant.
