= SFRP4 =

Protein-coding gene in the species Homo sapiens

Identifiers
- Aliases: SFRP4, FRP-4, FRPHE, sFRP-4, secreted frizzled related protein 4, PYL, FRZB-2
- External IDs: OMIM: 606570; MGI: 892010; HomoloGene: 2267; GeneCards: SFRP4; OMA:SFRP4 - orthologs

Gene location (Human)
Chr.	Chromosome 7 (human)
Band	7p14.1	Start	37,905,932 bp
Band	7p14.1	End	38,025,695 bp

Gene location (Mouse)
Chr.	Chromosome 13 (mouse)
Band	13 A2|13 6.99 cM	Start	19,807,274 bp
Band	13 A2|13 6.99 cM	End	19,817,164 bp
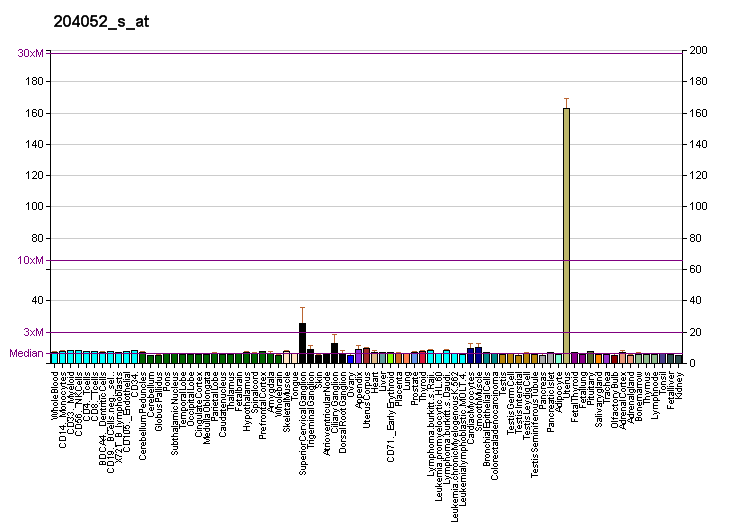

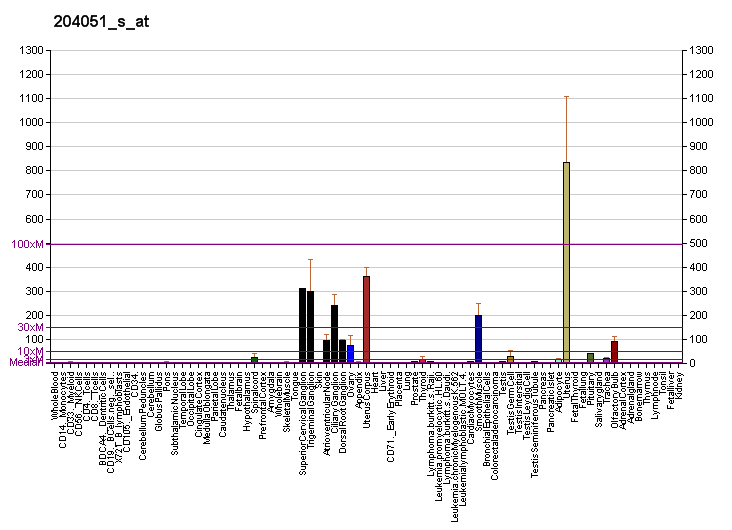
RNA expression pattern
Bgee	Human / Mouse (ortholog); Top expressed in: right uterine tube; canal of the cervix; ectocervix; vena cava; tibial nerve; spinal ganglia; Achilles tendon; right ovary; left ovary; smooth muscle tissue / Top expressed in: gastrula; ankle; superior surface of tongue; decidua; sciatic nerve; uterus; tibiofemoral joint; lumbar spinal ganglion; femur; body of femur; More reference expression data
BioGPS	More reference expression data
Gene ontology
Molecular function	protein binding; Wnt-protein binding; G protein-coupled receptor activity; Wnt-activated receptor activity
Cellular component	cytoplasm; extracellular region; cell surface; nucleus; extracellular space; integral component of membrane
Biological process	cell differentiation; positive regulation of keratinocyte apoptotic process; positive regulation of receptor internalization; positive regulation of canonical Wnt signaling pathway; negative regulation of Wnt signaling pathway; phosphate ion homeostasis; Wnt signaling pathway; negative regulation of DNA-binding transcription factor activity; multicellular organism development; negative regulation of sodium-dependent phosphate transport; positive regulation of gene expression; positive regulation of apoptotic process; response to hormone; positive regulation of epidermal cell differentiation; negative regulation of cell population proliferation; regulation of BMP signaling pathway; bone morphogenesis; negative regulation of canonical Wnt signaling pathway; negative regulation of non-canonical Wnt signaling pathway; G protein-coupled receptor signaling pathway; non-canonical Wnt signaling pathway; canonical Wnt signaling pathway
Sources:Amigo / QuickGO
Orthologs
Species	Human	Mouse
Entrez	6424	20379
Ensembl	ENSG00000106483	ENSMUSG00000021319
UniProt	Q6FHJ7	Q9Z1N6
RefSeq (mRNA)	NM_003014	NM_016687
RefSeq (protein)	NP_003005	NP_057896
Location (UCSC)	Chr 7: 37.91 – 38.03 Mb	Chr 13: 19.81 – 19.82 Mb
PubMed search
- Wikidata
View/Edit Human	View/Edit Mouse

Secreted frizzled-related protein 4 is a protein that in humans is encoded by the SFRP4 gene.

== Function ==
Secreted frizzled-related protein 4 (SFRP4) is a member of the SFRP family that contains a cysteine-rich domain homologous to the putative Wnt-binding site of Frizzled proteins. SFRPs act as soluble modulators of Wnt signaling. The expression of SFRP4 in ventricular myocardium correlates with apoptosis related gene expression.

Biallelic, recessive variants in the SFRP4 gene result in the genetic disorder of bone, Pyle disease, that is characterized by a failure of long bone remodeling with increased fragility. The association between SFRP4 deficiency and Pyle disease has highlighted the importance of SFRP4 in the formation of the bone cortex, and of the importance of bone cortex for the mechanical stability of long bone elements.

SFRP4 is a hub gene in a Type 2 Diabetes-associated gene coexpression module in human islets, and reduces glucose-induced insulin secretion through decreased β-cell exocytosis. Expression and release of SFRP4 from islets is enhanced by interleukin-1β. SFRP4 is elevated in serum several years before clinical diagnosis of Type 2 Diabetes. Individuals who have above-average levels of SFRP4 in the blood are five times more likely to develop diabetes in the next few years than those with below-average levels. SFRP4 concentration seems to correlate with obesity and systemic insulin resistance
