= Una Vita =

1892 novel by Italo Svevo

- Cover page of the 1989 Bompiani edition of Una Vita
- Author: Italo Svevo
- Genre: modernist novel
- Published: 1892

Una vita is Italo Svevo's first novel, published in 1892.

The protagonist is Alfonso Nitti, a young, dreamy clerk from the countryside working at a bank in Trieste whose literary ambitions, self-deception, and paralyzing inability to act lead him to squander his chances, including an affair with his employer’s daughter Annetta, and ultimately to take his own life.

Una vita was largely ignored on its publication. When it was noticed, it was to critique its grammar and prose. As Svevo’s reputation grew, critics returned to the novel: William Arrowsmith called it “the first demonstrably modern novel”, and scholars including P. N. Furbank have read its protagonist, Alfonso Nitti, as the first of Svevo’s ‘’inetti’’, weak-willed figures unable to act decisively in modern life. Not all later assessments were favorable; a 1963 review in ‘’The Spectator’’ admired the book’s social observation but did not consider it a major novel.

== Publication history ==
Una Vita was originally titled Un inetto – inetto, which may be translated as 'inept,' unfit', 'unsuitable' or 'incapable'. This title was rejected by the publisher, who requested that it be changed to Una vita – 'A Life' – which is also the name of a famous Maupassant novel.

Svevo's first draft was submitted in 1888. It was refused by the publishing house Treves, and wasn't published until 1892 by Vram, at the expense of Svevo himself.

== Plot ==
Alfonso Nitti, a shy young man with literary ambitions, leaves his mother's home in the countryside to work as a copy clerk at the Maller bank in an unnamed city, which is however recognizable as Trieste. He is bored by the routine of the office and ill at ease in the city. Eventually, Nitti is invited to the home of his employer, whose daughter Annetta hosts a weekly literary gathering attended by several suitors, among them Alfonso's acquaintance Macario.

Alfonso and Annetta agree to write a novel together. He does not respect her talent but lets her take charge of the project in the hope of winning her. He falls in love with her, and also increasingly grows to despise her. He successfully seduces her which leads to marriage being expected. He follows the advice of Francesca, her father's mistress, who warns him that the match would fail, and leaves the city. He is detained in the country by his mother's final illness and death. While he is away Annetta, as Francesca predicted, turns to another man.

When Alfonso returns from the country, he is treated coldly at the bank. He resolves to live a life of calm renunciation. This resolve fails when he learns that Annetta is engaged to Macario, and refuses to see him. He tries to ease his conscience by providing a dowry so that his landlady's daughter can marry the man who seduced her. After he is demoted at the bank, his protest offends Annetta's brother Federico, who challenges him to a duel. Rather than face it, Alfonso kills himself, feeling calm and relieved to be leaving a life to which he was never suited.

== Reception ==
Una vita was largely ignored by critics on its release. Those who did take notice faulted its grammatical errors, unintended dialect usages and what some described as impoverished prose. Reviewing Svevo's work in 2002, J. M. Coetzee read the novel's original title, Un inetto, as a Darwinian allusion to the ill-adapted individual, and described the book as following a bank clerk who, recognizing that he lacks drive and ambition, ends his own life. Coetzee called the replacement title "rather colorless".

Literary critic William Arrowsmith described the novel as unusual and important. He argued that, despite having been ignored on its first publication, it deserved to be read in its own right, as opposed to thinking of its main interest as being a precursor to La coscienza di Zeno. Arrowsmith says that the depiction of Alfonso Nitti is the first fully worked-out portrait of the "victim-hero" or anti-hero in modern literature and that it is "the first demonstrably modern novel". Arrowsmith also characterizes the novel as an inversion of the Bildungsroman, with Alfonso as a weakling Wilhelm Meister, tracing its vision of instinct sapped by modern office routine to Nietzsche's Genealogy of Morals rather than to Freud. He also commented that Svevo saw how office routine put its heaviest weight on the poor and the lower middle class.

Later scholarship, as the novel became better known, discussed its protagonist Alfonso Nitti as the first of Svevo's inetti. Ivair Carlos Castelan argued that, despite Nitti's ineptitude, the character departs in several ways from the archetypal inetto and is better seen as an ordinary modern subject with both strengths and weaknesses.

Una Vita continued to attract literary analysis for decades, especially when new translations came out. After the publication of the 1963 English translation, the novel was reviewed in The Spectator. Here, the reviewer said that the book’s social detail, including its petty office conflicts and the genteel appearances of bourgeois family life, had aged surprisingly well. The reviewer suggested that by having Alfonso co-write a trivial romantic novel with Annetta, Svevo was signalling his own commitment to truthfulness. The review concluded that the novel “did not impress me as being a major novel”, but said that in it, he could see the sparks that led to a future great work (meaning Zeno's Conscience).

‘’Italo Svevo: The Man and the Writer’’, by P. N. Furbank, came out in 1966, and was the first full-length study of Svevo in English. Furbank interpreted all three of Svevo’s novels as “studies in weakness”, with senility as Svevo’s governing metaphor: a sickness of the will marked by day-dreaming and an inability to make real decisions, combined with the illusion of making them. Furbank argued that Svevo’s protagonists, including Una Vitas Alfonso, match the type of man described by Max Nordau in ‘’Degeneration’’. These are men who avoid action and lack will-power.
