= EN1 (gene) =

Protein-coding gene in the species Homo sapiens

Identifiers
- Aliases: EN1, engrailed homeobox 1, ENDOVESLB
- External IDs: OMIM: 131290; MGI: 95389; GeneCards: EN1

Gene location (Human)
Chr.	Chromosome 2 (human)
Band	2q14.2	Start	118,842,171 bp
Band	2q14.2	End	118,847,648 bp

Gene location (Mouse)
Chr.	Chromosome 1 (mouse)
Band	1 E2.3|1 52.74 cM	Start	120,530,147 bp
Band	1 E2.3|1 52.74 cM	End	120,535,721 bp
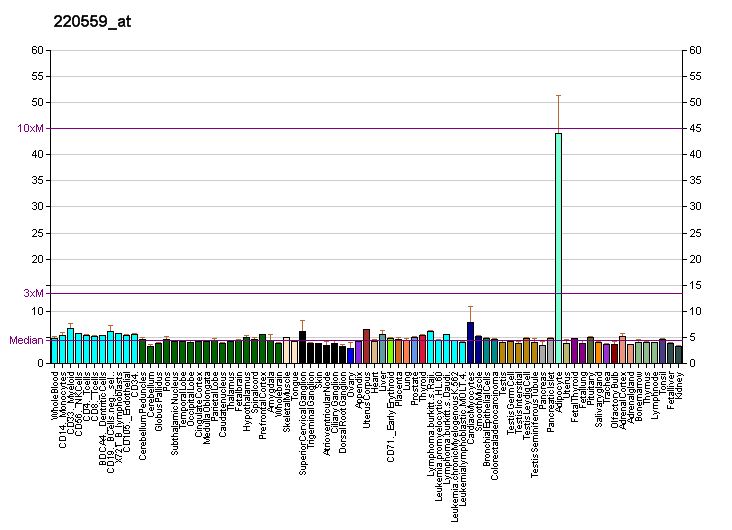
RNA expression pattern
Bgee	Human / Mouse (ortholog); Top expressed in: pars reticulata; skin of leg; gastrocnemius muscle; muscle of thigh; pars compacta; skin of abdomen; skin of hip; skin of thigh; skin of arm; muscle of arm / Top expressed in: sclerotome; Apical ectodermal ridge; surface ectoderm; rhombic lip; thoracic vertebral column; hair; ventral tegmental area; lumbar subsegment of spinal cord; pharynx; interpeduncular nucleus; More reference expression data
BioGPS	More reference expression data
Gene ontology
Molecular function	DNA binding; sequence-specific DNA binding; RNA polymerase II cis-regulatory region sequence-specific DNA binding; DNA-binding transcription repressor activity, RNA polymerase II-specific; DNA-binding transcription factor activity, RNA polymerase II-specific
Cellular component	nucleus; RSC-type complex
Biological process	negative regulation of neuron apoptotic process; skeletal system development; dopaminergic neuron differentiation; proximal/distal pattern formation; regulation of transcription, DNA-templated; multicellular organism growth; adult locomotory behavior; anatomical structure morphogenesis; hindbrain development; neuron development; negative regulation of transcription by RNA polymerase II; cerebellum development; limb development; multicellular organism development; motor learning; midbrain-hindbrain boundary development; embryonic brain development; drinking behavior; embryonic limb morphogenesis; neuron differentiation; regulation of gene expression; social behavior; pigmentation; dorsal/ventral pattern formation; embryonic forelimb morphogenesis; midbrain development; positive regulation of transcription by RNA polymerase II; negative regulation of neuron death; regulation of transcription by RNA polymerase II
Sources:Amigo / QuickGO
Orthologs
Databases	NCBI: entry; OMA: entry
Species	Human	Mouse
Entrez	2019	13798
Ensembl	ENSG00000163064	ENSMUSG00000058665
UniProt	Q05925	P09065
RefSeq (mRNA)	NM_001426	NM_010133
RefSeq (protein)	NP_001417	NP_034263
Location (UCSC)	Chr 2: 118.84 – 118.85 Mb	Chr 1: 120.53 – 120.54 Mb
PubMed search
- Wikidata
View/Edit Human	View/Edit Mouse

Homeobox protein engrailed-1 is a protein that in humans is encoded by the EN1 gene.

== Function ==
Homeobox-containing genes are thought to have a role in controlling development. In Drosophila, the engrailed (en) gene plays an important role during development in segmentation, where it is required for the formation of posterior compartments. Different mutations in the mouse homologs, En1 and En2, produced different developmental defects that frequently are lethal. The human engrailed homologs 1 and 2 encode homeodomain-containing proteins and have been implicated in the control of pattern formation during development of the central nervous system and the limbs.

Engrailed (En) 1 is a homeobox gene that helps regulate development in the dorsal midbrain and anterior hindbrain (cerebellum and colliculi) of humans. It is also essential in regulating the establishment of a dorso-ventral pattern in developing limbs. The expression of En1 is regulated until 13 days after fertilization by Fgf8, which controls the development of the forebrain and hindbrain. En1 is first expressed in this region on day 9.5 after fertilization for about 12 hours until En2 is expressed. After En2 expression, En1 is expressed again in other tissues such as somites and limb ectoderm throughout development. A knockout mouse model with the En1 homeobox deleted was developed; mice died less than 24 hours after birth because appeared to be unable to feed. The brains of the mice were studied and most of the cerebellum, colliculi, and cranial nerves 3 and 4 were missing. There was clear deletion in the mid-hindbrain, isthmus, junction region that began at day 9.5 after fertilization. All of the mice demonstrated marked forepaw deformities including fusion of digits and abnormal dorso-ventral patterning. The 13th ribs and sternums displayed delayed and abnormal ossification. The mouse model demonstrated that the expression of En1 is critical in the correct development of the brain, limbs, and sternum.

In 2021, a group of scientists and physicians around Andrea Superti-Furga in Lausanne and Stefan Mundlos in Berlin showed that biallelic loss-of-function variants at the EN1 locus result in a human phenotype that includes a severe impairment of limb development as well as cerebellar aplasia, reproducing the phenotype first observed in the gene knock-out mice described above. They also found that there is a long non-coding RNA (lncRNA) element at approx. 300 kb distance from EN1, that they called MAENLI (for Master on Engrailed-1 in the Limbs), that is responsible for activation of EN1 gene expression in the developing limbs. The biallelic loss of the MAENLI lncRNA element results in impairment of limb development in humans as seen in the EN1-associated condition, while cerebellar development is not affected.
