= Italo Svevo =

Italian and Austro-Hungarian businessman, playwright, and writer (1861–1928)

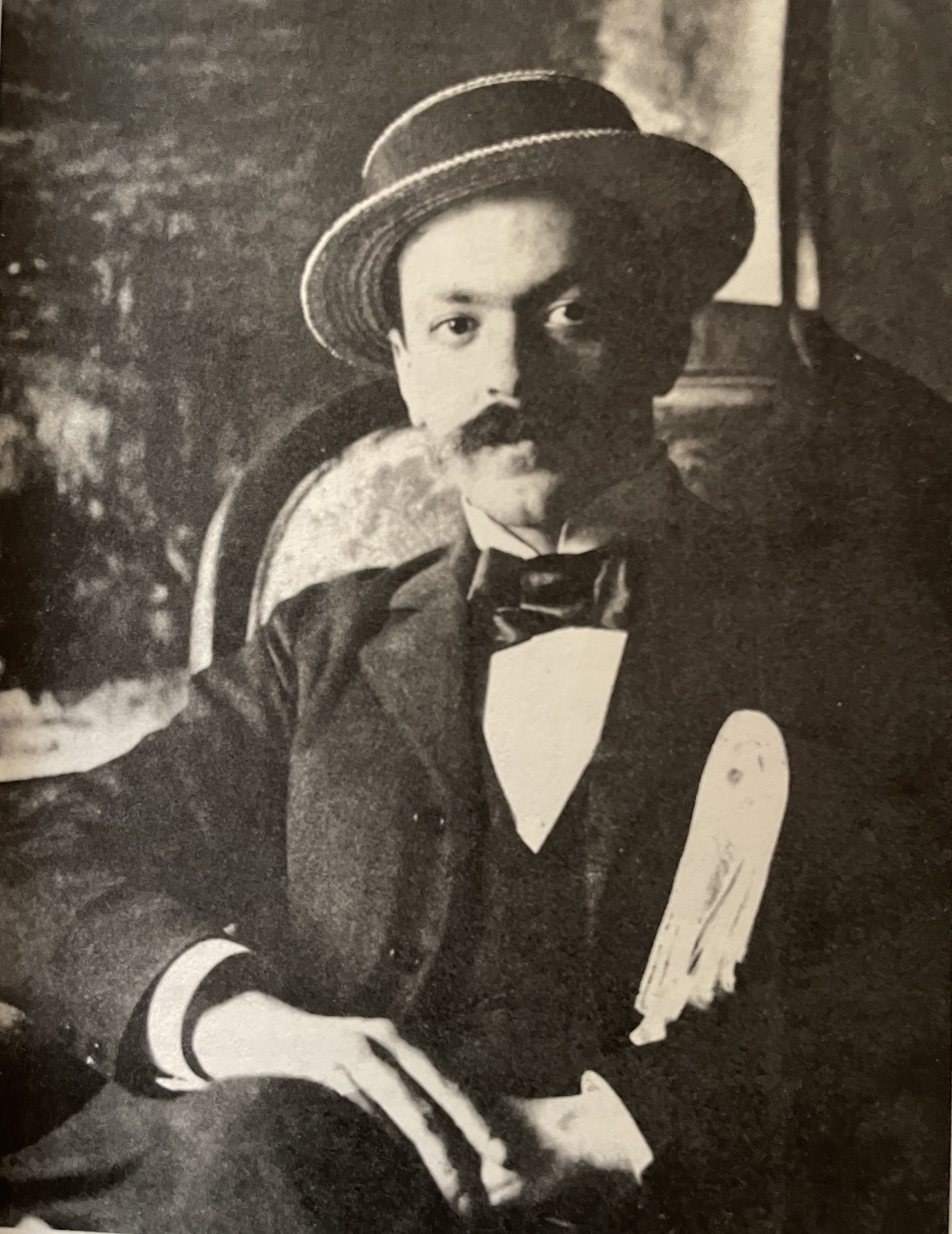
- Born: Aron Hector Schmitz; 19 December 1861; Trieste, Austrian Empire (present-day Italy)
- Died: 13 September 1928 (aged 66); Motta di Livenza, Kingdom of Italy
- Occupations: Novelist, short story writer, playwright, businessman
- Notable work: La coscienza di Zeno
- Movement: Modernism
- Spouse: Livia Veneziani
- Relatives: Steno Tedeschi (cousin)

Aron Hector Schmitz (19 December 1861 – 13 September 1928), better known by the pseudonym Italo Svevo (Italian: [ˈiːtalo ˈzvɛːvo]), was an Italian writer, businessman, novelist, playwright, and short story writer.

A close friend of Irish novelist and poet James Joyce, Svevo was considered a pioneer of the psychological novel in Italy and is best known for his modernist novel La coscienza di Zeno (1923), which became a widely appreciated classic of Italian literature. He was also the cousin of the Italian academic Steno Tedeschi.

== Early life ==
Born in Trieste (at the time in the Austrian Empire, then in Austria-Hungary since 1867) as Aron Ettore Schmitz to a Jewish German father and an Italian mother, Svevo was one of seven children, and grew up enjoying a passion for literature from a young age, reading works of Goethe, Schiller, Shakespeare, and the classics of French and Russian literature.

Svevo was a citizen of the Austro-Hungarian Empire until the end of the First World War. He spoke Italian as a second language, as he usually spoke the Triestine dialect. Due to his Germanophone ancestry by his father, he and his brothers were sent to a boarding school near Würzburg, in the German Empire, where he learnt and became fluent in German.

After returning to Trieste in 1880, Svevo continued his studies for a further two years at Istituto Revoltella, before being forced to take financial responsibility when his father filed for bankruptcy, after his once successful glassware business failed. This 20-year period as a bank clerk at the Unionbank of Vienna served as inspiration for his first novel, Una Vita (1892).

During his time at the bank, Svevo contributed to Italian-language socialist publication L'Indipendente (it), and began writing plays (which he rarely finished) before beginning work on Una vita in 1887. Svevo adhered to a humanistic and democratic socialism, which predisposed him to pacifism, and to advocate for the creation of a European economic union after the war.

Following the death of his parents, Svevo married his cousin Livia Veneziani in a civil ceremony in 1896. Soon after, Livia convinced him to convert to Catholicism and take part in a religious wedding (probably after a troublesome pregnancy). Personally, however, Svevo was an atheist. He became a partner in his wealthy father-in-law's paint business which specialized in manufacturing industrial paint for use on naval warships. He became successful in growing the business, and after trips to France and Germany set up a branch of the company in England.

Svevo lived for part of his life in Charlton, south-east London, while working for a family firm. He documented this period in his letters to his wife, which highlighted the cultural differences he encountered in Edwardian England. His old home at 67 Charlton Church Lane now carries a blue plaque.

== Writing career ==
Svevo first started writing short stories in 1880. He took on the pseudonym "Italo Svevo" (literally "Italus the Swabian") for the publication of his first novel, Una Vita, in 1892. The novel was not a success when first published. Later on, it attracted more favorable critical notice. Literary critic William Arrowsmith wrote that it is "the first demonstrably modern novel".

His second novel, Senilità (1898), was also received poorly when first published. But as happened with Una Vita, subsequent critics in future decades were kinder to the novel. An example is J. M. Coetzee who in 2002, ranked Senilità with The Kreutzer Sonata and Swann’s Way as one of the great novels of male sexual jealousy.

In 1919 he began work on La Coscienza di Zeno (known in English as Zeno's Conscience or Confessions of Zeno).

== Zeno's Conscience ==
In 1923 Italo Svevo published the psychological novel La Coscienza di Zeno. The work, showing the author's interest in the theories of Sigmund Freud, is written in the form of the memoirs of Zeno Cosini, who writes them at the insistence of his psychoanalyst. Svevo's novel received almost no attention from Italian readers and critics at the time.

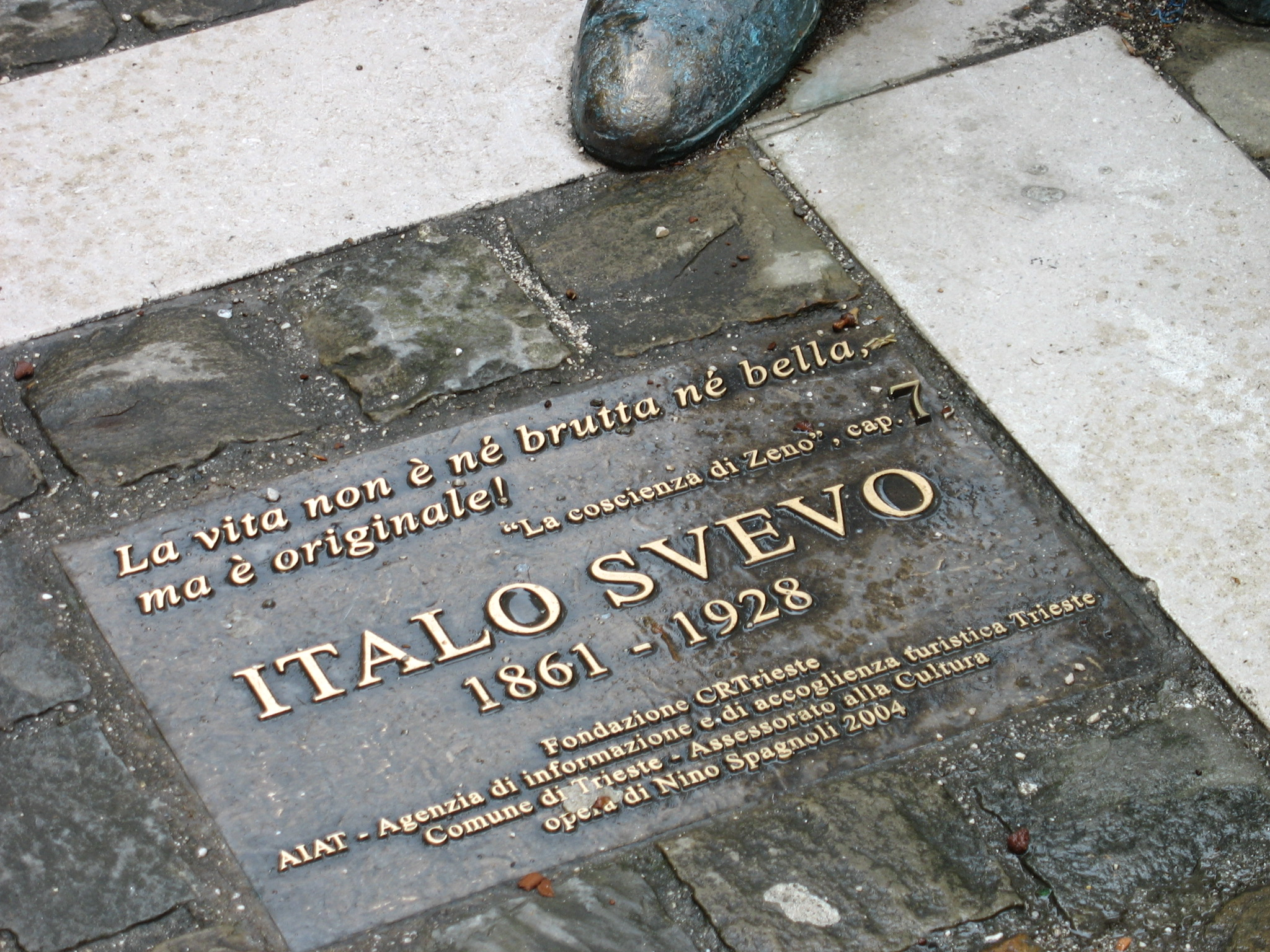
Italo Svevo statue in front of the Public Library in Trieste

The work might have disappeared altogether if it were not for the efforts of James Joyce. Joyce had met Svevo in 1907, when Joyce tutored him in English, while working for Berlitz in Trieste. Joyce read Svevo's earlier novels, Una Vita and Senilità.

Joyce championed Zeno's Conscience, helping to have it translated into French and then published in Paris, where critics praised it extravagantly. That led Italian critics, including Eugenio Montale, to discover it. Zeno Cosini, the book's hero and unreliable narrator, mirrored Svevo himself, being a businessman fascinated by Freudian theory. Svevo was also a model for Leopold Bloom, the protagonist of Joyce's seminal novel Ulysses.

Zeno's Conscience never looks outside the narrow confines of Trieste, much like Joyce's work, which rarely left Dublin in the last years of Ireland's time as part of the United Kingdom. Svevo often employs sardonic wit in his observations of Trieste and, in particular, of his hero, an indifferent man, who cheats on his wife, lies to his psychoanalyst, and is trying to explain himself to his psychoanalyst, by revisiting his memories.

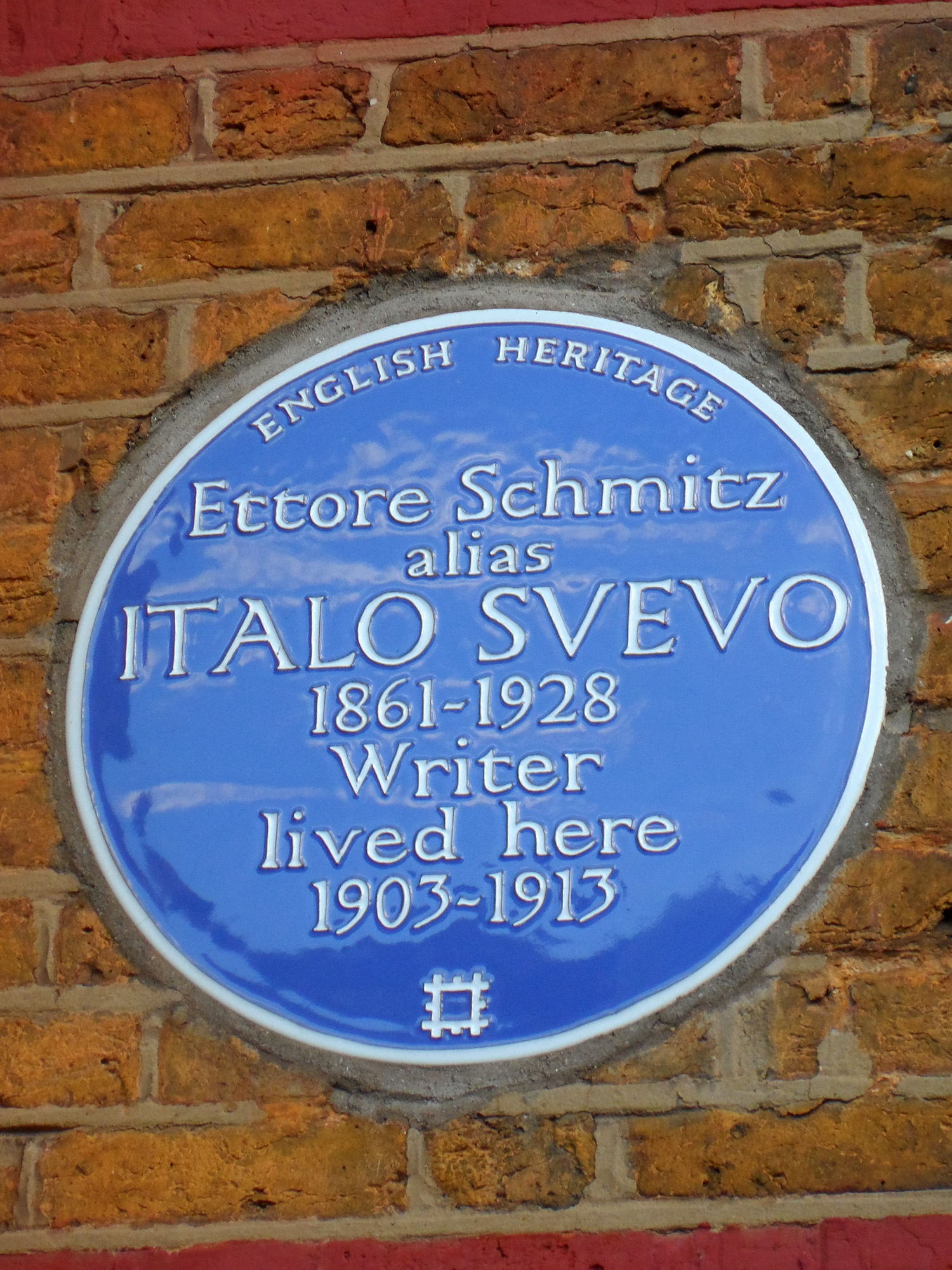
Blue plaque at 67 Charlton Church Lane, Charlton, London SE7 7AB, London Borough of Greenwich

There is a final connection between Svevo and the character Cosini. Cosini sought psychoanalysis, he said, in order to discover why he was addicted to nicotine. As Svevo reveals in his memoirs, each time he had given up smoking, with the iron resolve that this would be the "ultima sigaretta!!", he experienced the exhilarating feeling that he was now beginning life over without the burden of his old habits and mistakes. That feeling was, however, so strong that he found smoking irresistible, if only so that he could stop smoking again, in order to experience that thrill once more.

== Death ==
After being involved in a serious car crash, he was brought into hospital in Motta di Livenza, where his health rapidly failed. As death approached, he asked one of his visitors for a cigarette; his request was declined. Svevo replied: "That would have been my last". He died that afternoon.

== Legacy ==
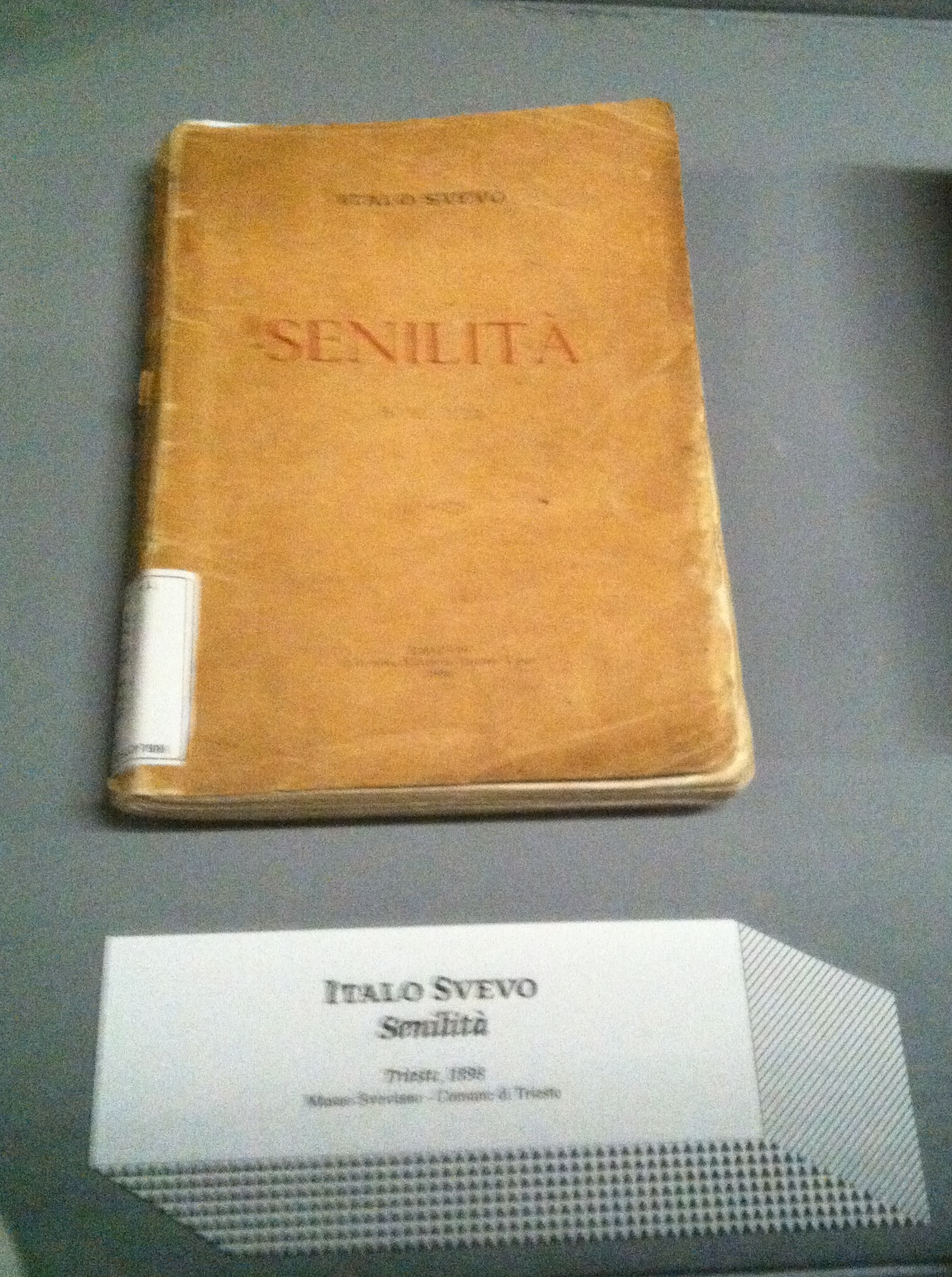
First edition of Senilità

Italo Svevo, 1927 sculpture by Ruggero Rovan, the only extant bust of Svevo from when the artist was still alive

Svevo, along with Luigi Pirandello, is considered a prominent figure of early 20th-century Italian literature, and has had an important influence on later generations of the country's writers.

Though only recognised for his literary achievements towards the end of his life, Svevo is celebrated as one of Italy's finest writers, particularly in his home city of Trieste, and has a statue in front of the Museum of Natural History erected in his honour.

The following are named after him:

- Istituto Comprensivo Italo Svevo in Trieste, Italy
- Liceo Italo Svevo in Cologne, Germany

== Selected works ==
Novels

- Una Vita (1892). A Life, trans. Archibald Colquhoun (1963).
- Senilità (1898). As a Man Grows Older, trans. Beryl de Zoete (1932); later as Emilio's Carnival, trans. Beth Archer Brombert (2001).
- La Coscienza di Zeno (1923). Confessions of Zeno, trans. Beryl de Zoete (1930); later as Zeno's Conscience, trans. William Weaver (2003).

Novellas

- La novella del buon vecchio e della bella fanciulla (1926). The Nice Old Man and the Pretty Girl.
- Una burla riuscita (1926). A Perfect Hoax, trans. J. G. Nichols (2003).

Short story collections

- La novella del buon vecchio e della bella fanciulla, e altre prose inedite e postume (1929, posthumous). The Nice Old Man and the Pretty Girl and Other Stories, trans. L. Collison-Morley (1930).
- Corto viaggio sentimentale e altri racconti inediti (1949, posthumous). Short Sentimental Journey and Other Stories, trans. Beryl de Zoete, L. Collison-Morley and Ben Johnson (1967).

Other

- Saggi e pagine sparse (1954, posthumous). Essays and Scattered Pages.
- Commedie (1960, posthumous). Dramatic works.
- Lettere (1966, posthumous). Correspondence with Eugenio Montale.
- Further Confessions of Zeno (1969, posthumous). Trans. Ben Johnson and P. N. Furbank. Fragments of a sequel to La coscienza di Zeno. Includes: "The Old Old Man", "An Old Man's Confessions", "Umbertino", "A Contract", "This Indolence of Mine", and Regeneration: A Comedy in Three Acts.
- A Very Old Man: Stories (2022, posthumous). Trans. Frederika Randall. Includes: "The Contract", "The Confessions of a Very Old Man", "Umbertino", "My Leisure", and "Foreword".

== Sources ==
- Italo Svevo, Zeno's Conscience. Trans. William Weaver. New York: Vintage International, 2001.
- Fabio Vittorini, Italo Svevo, Milano, Mondadori, 2011
- Piero Garofalo, "Time-Consciousness in Italo Svevo's La coscienza di Zeno," in Quaderni d'italianistica, XVIII.2 (Fall 1997): pp. 221–233.
- Livia Veneziani Svevo, Memoir of Italo Svevo, Preface by P. N. Furbank, Trans. by Isabel Quigly. London: Libris, 1991. ISBN 1-870352-53-X
- Gatt-Rutter, J., Italo Svevo: A Double Life (1988)
- Moloney, Brian, Italo Svevo: A Critical Introduction (1974)
- Furbank, Philip N., Italo Svevo: The Man and the Writer (1966)
- Gatt-Rutter, J & Mulroney, B, 'This England is so different' – Italo Svevo's London Writings. Troubador
