= Seva Canada Society =

Canadian charitable organization

Logo of the Seva Canada Society

Seva Canada Society is a registered Canadian charitable organization whose mission is to restore sight and prevent blindness in the developing world. It was established in 1982 with help from Canadian International Development Agency (CIDA, now Global Affairs Canada). It is located in Vancouver, British Columbia. Seva Canada currently works in twelve countries around the world.

Seva Canada is rated as a four star charity on Charity Intelligence Canada.

== History ==
Seva Canada's sister organization Seva Foundation is located in Berkeley, California, and was co-founded in 1978 by Dr. Larry Brilliant, Ram Dass, Wavy Gravy, Nicole Grasset and Govindappa Venkataswamy. In 1982 Dr. Alan Morinis and Dr. Bev Spring established Seva Canada and secured funding from the Canadian International Development Agency (now Global Affairs Canada).

In 2015, in conjunction with Seva Foundation and the Kilimanjaro Centre for Community Ophthalmology, Seva Canada won the António Champalimaud Vision Award.

== Programs ==
Seva Canada focuses its efforts on five main categories:

- Sight restoration and blindness prevention programs
- Collaboration on the development of partner clinics, hospitals and institutions
- Funding and promotion of research internationally and in Canada
- Funding initiatives to integrate eye care with public health institutes
- Promotion and funding training and development of medical and non-medical personnel with overseas partner organizations

== Honorary Patrons ==
- The Right Honourable Adrienne Clarkson - Canada's 26th Governor General from 1999 to 2005
- The Honourable Lloyd Axworthy - Canadian politician, statesman and academic
- The Honourable Patrick Reid - Officer of the Order of Canada (1987)
- Leonard Cohen - late Canadian singer, songwriter, musician, poet, and novelist
- The Honourable Judith Guichon - 29th Lieutenant Governor of British Columbia
