= David Green (social entrepreneur) =

American social entrepreneur (born 1956)

- Born: March 17, 1956 (age 70); Philadelphia, Pennsylvania
- Education: University of Michigan
- Occupation: Social entrepreneur
- Known for: Aurolab
- Awards: MacArthur Fellowship; Spirit of Helen Keller Award; Ashoka Fellow

David Green (born March 17, 1956) is an American social entrepreneur. His work has focused on making technology and healthcare services more accessible and sustainable.

== Career ==
Green helped Govindappa Venkataswamy and his team to establish Aurolab in South India, a nonprofit manufacturer of low cost intraocular lenses for treating cataracts. He also developed suture and surgical blade manufacturing for Aurolab.

He is known for developing many eye care programs and for making them self-financing from user fees while serving the lower economic strata. These include: the Aravind Eye Hospital in Madurai, India; the Lumbini Eye Care Project and the Tilganga Eye Institute in Nepal; the Grameen Eye Hospitals in Bangladesh; the SadGuru Trust in Chitrakoot, India; the Al Noor Magrabi Eye Hospital in Egypt; and the Visualiza in Guatemala.

He co-founded Sound World Solution, a social enterprise to make affordable hearing devices with a novel fitting named LegWorks, which makes high quality prosthetic knees affordable. He also co-founded the Eye Fund, a $15M social investing fund in collaboration with Deutsche Bank, Ashoka and International Agency for Prevention of Blindness, that provides affordable loan financing for sustainable eye care programs.

His work has been profiled in Fortune Magazine, NPR, the Economist, Forbes, on CNN and in the PBS documentary series, "The New Heroes".

== Life ==
Green was born in Ypsilanti, Michigan. He graduated from the University of Michigan with an MPH. He is listed as a notable alumni of University of Michigan and the University of Michigan School of Public Health.

He serves as a board member for the Johns Hopkins Social Innovations Lab, the Stanford University Biomedical Fellowship for India, the University of Michigan Ross School of Business Social Investing Fund, and the Seva Advisory Board.

== Awards ==
In 2002, Green was named an Ashoka Fellow and featured as a Leading Social Entrepreneur by the Schwab Foundation.

In 2004, he was awarded a MacArthur Fellowship for his work as "a pioneer in the manufacture and distribution of advanced health care products for patients in the developing world who could not otherwise afford them."

In both 2004 and 2006, he was listed as one of the recipients of the Fast 50 Award by Fast Company Magazine.

In 2009, he received the Spirit of Helen Keller Award, given by Helen Keller International, and the University of Michigan Humanitarian Service Award. He was also voted as the leading social entrepreneur from the University of Michigan by the University of Michigan Engineering School.

In 2011, he received the Certificate of Honorary Award of Liaoning Province as a foreign expert who has made great contributions to the economic and social development of Liaoning Province.
