= Beleza =

Beleza is a surname. Notable people with the surname include:

- André Beleza (born 1985), Brazilian footballer
- Leonor Beleza (born 1948), Portuguese politician
- Teresa Pizarro Beleza (born 1951), Portuguese academic
