= Sound World Solutions =

- Type: Private
- Founded: 2007
- Founder: Stavros Basseas (Co-Founder, CEO); David Green (Co-Founder)
- Headquarters: Park Ridge, Illinois, US
- Area served: United States
- Products: Personal Sound Amplification Products, Hearing aids
- Website: soundworldsolutions.com

Sound World Solutions, Inc. designs, manufactures and markets Personal Sound Amplification Products and hearing aids that also function as Bluetooth devices. Sound World Solutions is based in Park Ridge, Illinois.

== History ==
Sound World Solutions was established in 2007 by Dr. Stavros Basseas, an engineer and hearing aid technologist, and David Green, a specialist in public health projects for developing markets, to develop low-cost hearing assistance devices. These devices can be adjusted using a tablet or laptop computer program or a smartphone application, instead of conventional clinical instruments, such as an audiometer, Hi-Pro box and anechoic chamber. As a result, these devices can be used as hearing aids in developing markets where such instrumentation does not commonly exist.

This design platform was intended to address the needs of the approximately 1 billion people that The World Health Organization (WHO) estimates have some degree of hearing loss, including 328 million who experience disabling hearing loss. Of this number, the vast majority of people who get hearing aids live in the U.S. and Europe, leaving the developing world grossly underserved.

== Products ==
Sound World Solutions' products offer features that can allow users to fit and customize their own hearing devices independently, typically using a mobile application without the assistance of a licensed professional. Currently, the company's flagship products are the CS50+ (Personal Sound Amplification Products), also known as the Sidekick, and the HD100 (Hearing Aid), also known as the Companion. The company has scheduled the launch of their newest product, the HD75, for December 2019. This product will be a smaller version of their HD100 with much of the same capabilities.

Sound World Solutions sells to both individual consumers and distributors. The company's distribution partners include domestic and international retailers in regions such as Europe, Brazil, and Mexico.

== Research evidence ==
A study published in JAMA by Reed et al. (2017) from Johns Hopkins University used Sound World Solutions' hearing device to demonstrate that Personal Sound Amplification Products can achieve similar hearing results when compared to a traditional Hearing Aid.

Another research team from the National Acoustic Laboratories in Australia used Sound World Solutions' device to show that self-fitting hearing aids appear to be a viable option when compared to traditional hearing aids. These self-fitting devices can represent a more affordable option for consumers.

== Business strategy ==
Sound World Solutions’ design platform relies on inexpensive off-the-shelf Bluetooth technology, yielding a hearing device that costs less than a tenth the price of a conventional hearing aid. Rather than disguise its hearing device as a hearing aid, Sound World Solutions designed it to look and function as a Bluetooth device, which is common among people without hearing loss.

By developing a customizable diagnostic system based on ubiquitous and low-cost cellular telephone technology, the device serves individuals who are not addressed by the conventional hearing aid industry in developed nations, as well as in the developing world, where it would take many years to develop a network to dispense conventional hearing aids.

This business model is based on one created by Green, who worked to establish Aurolab, an Indian company that manufactures intraocular lenses for the treatment of cataracts. By emphasizing volume, Aurolab drove down the price of lenses from several hundred dollars to about $2 each, enabling millions of people to affordably regain their sight.
