= PSAP =

PSAP may refer to:

- Prosaposin, a protein associated with Gaucher disease
- Public-safety answering point
- Prostatic-specific acid phosphatase
- Personal sound amplification products
- Presentation Service Access Point, see Service Access Point
- PSAP Sigli, an Indonesian football club
- Puget Sound and Pacific Railroad, a railroad in Washington, United States
- Preservation self-assessment program, a collection care tool for heritage institutions
