= Fred Hollows =

New Zealand-Australian ophthalmologist (1929–1993)

Fred Hollows AC
- Born: Frederick Cossom Hollows; 9 April 1929; Dunedin, New Zealand
- Died: 10 February 1993 (aged 63); Randwick, New South Wales, Australia
- Education: Victoria University of Wellington; University of Otago
- Occupations: Ophthalmologist; philanthropist
- Years active: 1951−1992
- Political party: Communist Party of New Zealand (1950s–1960s)
- Spouses: Mary Skiller (m. 1958; died 1975) Gabi O'Sullivan (m. 1980–1993)
- Children: 7

Frederick Cossom Hollows (9 April 1929 – 10 February 1993) was a New Zealand–Australian ophthalmologist who became known for his work in restoring eyesight for people in Australia and many other countries through initiatives such as the Fred Hollows Foundation.

== Early life ==
Fred Cossom Hollows was born in Dunedin, New Zealand, the fourth son of a working class father—"small-time horticulturalist", formerly a railway fireman, later driver—Joseph Hollows, whose father was of Lancashire origin, and Clarice, daughter of ship's cook Frederick Cossom Marshall, from Newcastle-upon-Tyne. The family lived in Dunedin for the first seven years of his life. He had one year of informal primary schooling at North East Valley Primary School and began attending Palmerston North Boys' High School when he was 13. Hollows received his BA degree from Victoria University of Wellington. He briefly studied at a seminary, but decided against a life in the clergy. After observing the doctors at a mental hospital during some charity work, he instead enrolled at Otago Medical School.

While living in Dunedin, he was an active member of the New Zealand Alpine Club and made several first ascents of mountains in the Mount Aspiring/Tititea region of Central Otago. In 1951, Edmund Hillary was on a test run for Everest, and was backpacking up the Tasman Glacier towards Malte Brun Hut; all five were carrying loads of 70 lb (32 kg) or more. Hillary was "met by a young man (Hollows) who came bounding down to meet me and offered to carry my load up to the hut. No one had ever offered to carry my load before, but it was too good an offer to refuse. I handed my pack over and saw his legs buckle slightly at the knees."

Hollows was a member of the Communist Party of New Zealand during the 1950s and 1960s.

Hollows was married twice: in 1958 to Mary Skiller, who died in 1975, and in 1980 to Gabi O'Sullivan. He first met Gabi in the early 1970s during her training as an orthoptist, and they later worked together on the National Trachoma and Eye Health Program. They would ultimately found The Fred Hollows Foundation together.

Hollows was originally a New Zealand citizen. He declined the award of honorary Officer of the Order of Australia in 1985. He adopted Australian citizenship in 1989 and was named Australian of the Year in 1990. He accepted the substantive award of Companion of the Order of Australia in 1991. Hollows published an autobiography in 1991.

== Medical career ==
In 1961, he went to Moorfields Eye Hospital in England to study ophthalmology. He then did post-graduate work in Wales before moving in 1965 to Australia, where he became associate professor of ophthalmology at the University of New South Wales in Sydney. From 1965 to 1992, he chaired the ophthalmology division overseeing the teaching departments at the University of New South Wales, and the Prince of Wales and Prince Henry hospitals.

Early in the 1970s, Hollows worked with the Gurindji people at Wave Hill in the Northern Territory and then with the people around Bourke and other isolated New South Wales towns, stations and Aboriginal communities. Inspired by the missionary ophthalmologist Fr Frank Flynn, he became especially concerned with the high number of Aboriginal people who had eye disorders, particularly trachoma, an eye disease not found elsewhere in the developed world. These visits inspired his life's mission to advocate for better access to eye health and living conditions for Indigenous Australians. In July 1971, with Mum (Shirl) Smith and others, he set up the Aboriginal Medical Service in suburban Redfern in Sydney, and subsequently assisted in the establishment of medical services for Aboriginal People throughout Australia.

He was responsible for organising the Royal Australian College of Ophthalmologists to establish the National Trachoma and Eye Health Program (the "Trachoma Program") 1976–1978, with funding by the Federal Government. Hollows himself spent three years visiting Aboriginal communities to provide eye care and carry out a survey of eye defects. More than 460 Aboriginal communities were visited, and 62,000 Aboriginal people were examined, leading to 27,000 being treated for trachoma and 1,000 operations being carried out.

=== Overseas work ===
His visits to Nepal in 1985, Eritrea in 1987, and Vietnam in 1991 resulted in training programs to train local technicians to perform eye surgery. These experiences motivated him to find a way to reduce the cost of eye care and treatment in developing countries. Hollows organised intraocular lens laboratories in Eritrea and Nepal to manufacture and provide lenses at cost, which was about A$10 (approximately US$7.50) each. Both laboratories started production after his death, in 1993.

The Fred Hollows Foundation was launched as an Australian charitable foundation in Sydney on 3 September 1992 to continue the work of Fred Hollows in providing eye care for the underprivileged and poor, and to improve the health of Indigenous Australians. The Foundation has also registered as a charity organisation in the United Kingdom where Fred did much of his training, and in his country of birth, New Zealand.

=== Opinions regarding HIV/AIDS ===
In 1992, Hollows spoke at the Alice Springs National Aboriginal HIV/AIDS Conference, and argued that some areas of the AIDS campaign were being inadequately dealt with at the time. According to The Australian's Martin Thomas, Hollows stated that some homosexuals were "recklessly spreading the virus"; therefore, the safe sex campaign was an inadequate way of dealing with the issue. To contain the disease, Hollows argued that promiscuity needed to be addressed. Hollows observed the spread of AIDS in contemporary African communities and he was concerned that AIDS would spread as vehemently through Aboriginal communities.

== Death ==
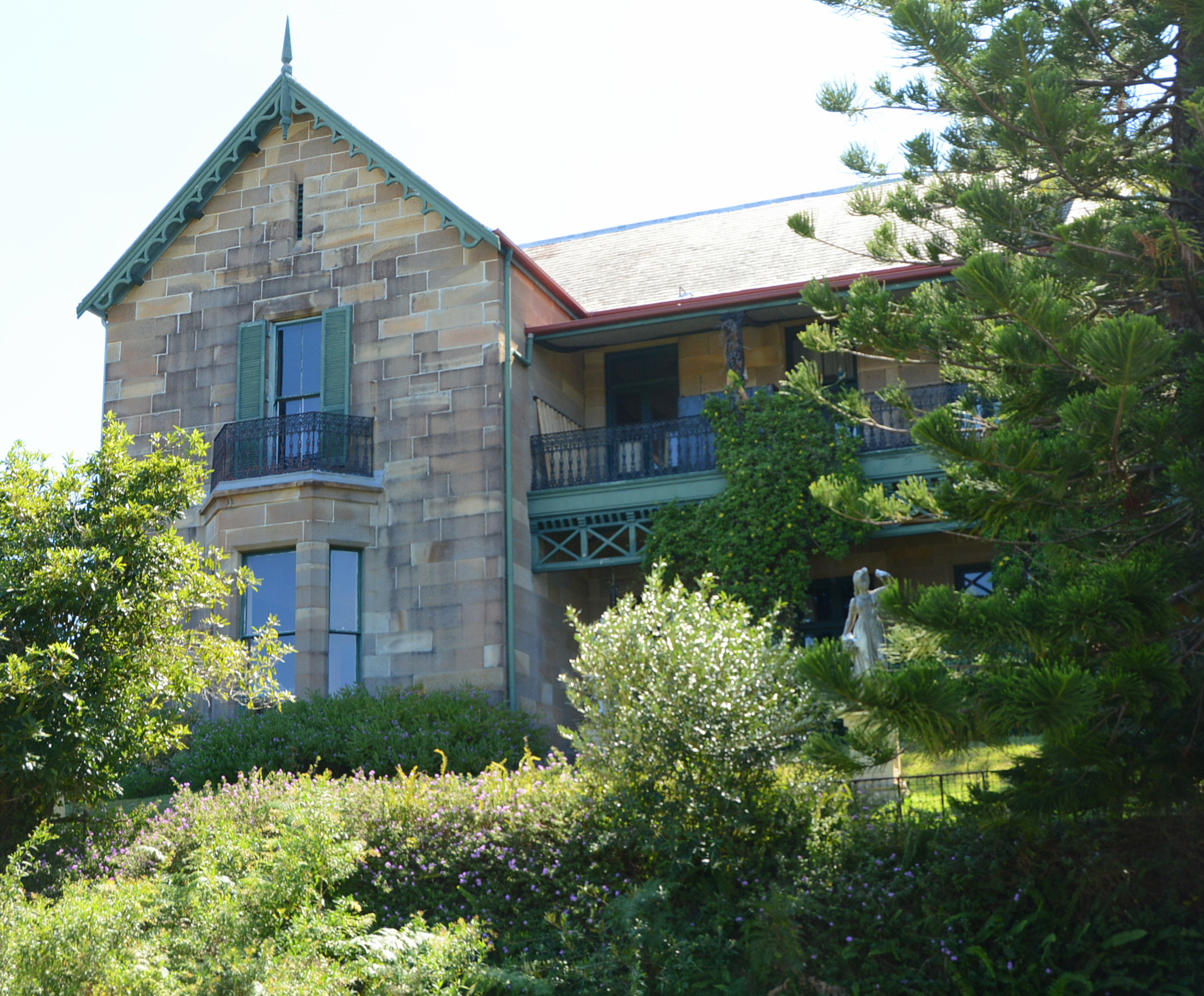
Farnham House, the Hollows home in the suburb of Randwick

He married Gabi Hollows (an Australian Living Treasure), and had children Tanya, Ben, Cam, Emma, Anna-Louise, Ruth and Rosa.

Hollows died in Sydney, Australia, on 10 February 1993, 57 days short of his 64th birthday. The cause of his death was metastatic renal cancer primarily affecting his lungs and brain. He had been diagnosed with the disease six years earlier, in 1987. Upon his death, the Chief Minister of the ACT, Rosemary Follett, described Hollows to her parliamentary colleagues as "an egalitarian and a self-named anarcho-syndicalist who wanted to see an end to the economic disparity which exists between the First and Third Worlds and who believed in no power higher than the best expressions of the human spirit found in personal and social relationships." Hollows was given a state funeral service at St Mary's Cathedral in Sydney, though he was an atheist. In accordance with his wishes, he was interred in Bourke, where he had worked in the early 1970s.

A reserve near his old home in the Sydney suburb of Randwick was named Fred Hollows Reserve in 1993. In 1998 the asteroid 12113 Hollows was named after him.

== Recognition and awards ==
- 1981: Advance Australia Award for Aboriginal eye care.
- 1985: was a consultant to the World Health Organization (WHO).
- 1985: offered appointment as an honorary Officer (AO) of the Order of Australia but he refused to accept the award because he was appalled at what he regarded as blatant lack of interest by the government in eye care for Aboriginal people. However, he went on to become an Australian citizen on 26 April 1989.
- 1990: received Human Rights Medal
- 1990: named Australian of the Year
- 1990: received a second Advance Australia Award, for Medicine and Overseas Aid
- 1991: named Humanist of the Year
- 1991: named a Paul Harris Fellow by Rotary International
- 1991: received Honorary Doctor of Medicine and Doctor of Science, University of New South Wales
- 1991: appointed Companion of the Order of Australia (AC)
- 1991: awarded Honorary Doctorate of Science, Macquarie University
- 1991: named the first honorary citizen of Eritrea
- 1992: received Honorary Doctorate, Queensland University of Technology
- 1993: received Albert Schweitzer Award of Distinction, Chapman University, USA
- 1993: received Rotary International's highest honour, the Rotary Award for World Understanding.
- 1993: received the Royal Australian College of Ophthalmologists Medal for his years of distinguished meritorious and selfless service – presented to him the night before he died.
- 1993: posthumously named a Melvin Jones Fellow of Lions Clubs International.
- 1993: Fred Hollows Reserve in Hollow's hometown of Randwick, Sydney established to preserve a natural rainforest gully and save it from future development.
- 2004: entered into the 'Hall of Fame' at the inaugural NSW Aboriginal Health Awards, in recognition of his "outstanding contribution and achievement to Indigenous health in Australia".
- 2005: an operating theatre was named after him at Canberra Eye Hospital, ACT, Australia.
- 2005: named one of "New Zealand's Top 100 History Makers" by Prime Television New Zealand.
- 2006: named one of the "100 most influential Australians" by The Bulletin magazine.
- 2010: featured on $1 Coin from the Royal Australian Mint as part of the Inspirational Australians Series.
- 2016: The street in a new, developing sub-section in his birthplace Dunedin, called Three Hills, was named Fred Hollows Way, in memory.
- 2017: Sydney Ferries' Emerald-class ferry named Fred Hollows.

== See also ==
- Himalayan Cataract Project
- Fred Hollows Foundation
- Sanduk Ruit
- Anarchism in Australia
