= Maria dos Prazeres Beleza =

Portuguese jurist (born 1956)

Vice President of the Supreme Court of Justice of Portugal
- In office 2018–2023

Member of the Supreme Court of Justice of Portugal
- In office 2006–2018

Member of the Constitutional Court
- In office 1998–2006

Personal details
- Born: 1956 (age 69–70) Coimbra, Portugal
- Children: 5
- Relatives: Teresa Pizarro Beleza (sister); Leonor Beleza (sister)
- Education: University of Lisbon
- Occupation: Lawyer; Academic

Maria dos Prazeres Beleza (born 1956) is a Portuguese judge and professor of law who served as vice-president of the Supreme Court of Justice between 2018 and 2023, the first woman to hold this position.

== Early life and education ==
Beleza was born in Coimbra in 1956. Both of her parents were lawyers and her father taught at the University of Coimbra. Her family moved to the Portuguese capital, Lisbon, when she was three. She is the sister of Leonor Beleza, president of the Champalimaud Foundation, and Teresa Pizarro Beleza, the first woman to head the Faculty of Law at NOVA University Lisbon.

Beleza studied law at the University of Lisbon from 1973 and, while at university, presented a television programme for children called Janela Grande (Big Window). Her education was disrupted by the Carnation Revolution that overthrew the Estado Novo dictatorship in April 1974 and she subsequently retook some of the courses at the Catholic University of Portugal before returning to the University of Lisbon to graduate.

== Career ==
Beleza taught civil procedure and civil law at the Faculty of Law of the University of Lisbon, at the Catholic University and at the Lusíada University. In 1987 she joined the legal centre of the Presidency of the Council of Ministers, while continuing to teach, even after she had been appointed director of the centre in 1989. In 1998, she became a member of the Constitutional Court reducing her teaching to just one class, on civil procedure, at the Catholic University, while serving as the chair of the civil procedure department. In 2006 she became one of the 60 judges in the Supreme Court of Justice in the category of "jurist of merit", the first member to be appointed in this category. Only the second woman to become a member of the Supreme Court, she became president of the 7th Section of the court, which handles non-criminal cases. She was elected by her fellow judges to be one of the two vice presidents of the Supreme Court in October 2018. In 2021 she was one of three candidates for the position of the president of the court but came second to Henrique Luís de Brito Araújo in the ballot.

== Recognition ==
Beleza was made alumnus of the year by the Faculty of Law of the Catholic University in 2015. In 2023 she was awarded the gold medal of the Portuguese Bar Association.

== Personal life ==
Beleza married at the age of 23. She has five children, none of whom is a lawyer.
