= Joan Miller (ophthalmologist) =

Canadian ophthalmologist

- Born: Toronto, Ontario, Canada
- Education: MIT (SB Biology); Harvard Medical School (MD)
- Known for: Development of Visudyne (verteporfin photodynamic therapy); Scientific basis of anti-VEGF therapy for eye disease
- Awards: Champalimaud Vision Award (2014); Mildred Weisenfeld Award (2015)
- Scientific career
- Fields: Ophthalmology (vitreo-retinal surgery); Angiogenesis; Neuroscience; Genetics
- Workplaces: Harvard Medical School; Massachusetts Eye and Ear; Massachusetts General Hospital

Joan Whitten Miller is a Canadian-American ophthalmologist and scientist who has made notable contributions to the treatment and understanding of eye disorders (particularly diseases of the retina). She is credited for developing photodynamic therapy (PDT) with verteporfin (Visudyne), the first pharmacologic therapy for retinal disease. She also co-discovered the role of vascular endothelial growth factor (VEGF) in eye disease and demonstrated the therapeutic potential of VEGF inhibitors, forming the scientific basis of anti-VEGF therapy for age-related macular degeneration (AMD), diabetic retinopathy, and related conditions.

== Early life and education ==
Joan Miller (née Whitten) was born in Toronto, Canada, and attended Bishop Strachan School. She received her SB in biology from Massachusetts Institute of Technology, where she also rowed crew for four years, taking 2nd place in the Head of the Charles Regatta in 1978 and 3rd nationally in 1980. She received her MD at Harvard Medical School in 1985 and interned at Newton-Wellesley Hospital; she then completed residency training in ophthalmology in the Harvard Medical School Department of Ophthalmology in 1989, and a research and clinical fellowship in vitreoretinal surgery at Massachusetts Eye and Ear (the primary affiliate hospital of the Harvard Medical School Department of Ophthalmology) in 1991.

== Medical and academic career ==
In 1991, Miller joined Mass. Eye and Ear as an assistant in ophthalmology. She became an assistant surgeon in 1992, an associate surgeon in 1996, and a surgeon in 2002. Miller became chief of ophthalmology at Mass. Eye and Ear in 2003, and in 2009 she also became chief of ophthalmology at Massachusetts General Hospital. Miller is the first woman to serve as chief of either department.

Miller is a faculty member of Harvard Medical School (HMS) in the Department of Ophthalmology, beginning with her 1991 appointment as an instructor in ophthalmology. She was promoted to assistant professor of ophthalmology in 1994, associate professor of ophthalmology in 1998, and professor of ophthalmology in 2002. In 2003, Miller became chair of the HMS Department of Ophthalmology and Henry Willard Williams Professor of Ophthalmology. In 2017, she was promoted to David Glendenning Cogan Professor of Ophthalmology. Miller is the first female ophthalmologist to achieve the rank of Professor at HMS and the first woman to chair the Department of Ophthalmology.

== Research and clinical innovations ==
=== Verteporfin Photodynamic Therapy (Visudyne) ===
Verteporfin

In the 1990s, through a series of preclinical and clinical studies, Miller, Evangelos Gragoudas, and colleagues at Mass. Eye and Ear and Mass General Hospital (in collaboration with QLT PhotoTherapeutics Inc. and Novartis) developed photodynamic therapy (PDT) with verteporfin (Visudyne). Verteporfin, a light-sensitive dye, is injected systemically, and a laser specifically activates the drug in the choroidal vessels, blocking vessel leakage and preventing further vessel growth. On April 12, 2000, verteporfin became the first drug approved by the Food and Drug Administration (FDA) for treating AMD.

In 2000, Visudyne was selected by Popular Science magazine for the "Best of What's New" Award, and by Business Week as one of the "Best Products of 2000." For her role in pioneering the pharmacologic treatment of retinal disease, Miller delivered the 2002 Jules Gonin Lecture, an award that recognizes individuals "for making a significant contribution to the understanding and treatment of eye diseases."

=== Anti-VEGF therapy for ocular disease ===
During the development of Visudyne, Miller and colleagues also examined the molecular mechanisms of ocular neovascularization. In 1994, using a primate model, Miller (along with Anthony Adamis, Patricia D'Amore, and others) were the first to correlate VEGF with ocular neovascularization in vivo. That same year, Miller and colleagues (including Adamis and Judah Folkman) were the first to report increased levels of VEGF in the eyes of patients with vascular eye disease (diabetic retinopathy). These findings were replicated in a larger study by Lloyd Paul Aiello and George King of Joslin Diabetes Center and Napoleone Ferrara of Genentech. Drs. Miller, Gragoudas, Ferrara, and Adamis also demonstrated that introducing VEGF into normal primate eyes could cause several intraocular vascular disorders, such as retinal ischemia and neovascular glaucoma. These studies strongly correlated VEGF protein with pathological ocular neovascularization both in patients and in experimental models.

In a series of parallel and collaborative preclinical studies, Miller and colleagues effectively blocked ocular neovascularization with a VEGF-neutralizing antibody (bevacizumab), a VEGF-neutralizing antibody fragment (ranibizumab), and a VEGF-neutralizing aptamer EYE001 (later known as pegaptanib). These studies not only reinforced VEGF's key role in ocular pathology, but also provided the scientific foundation for clinical trials of multiple anti-VEGF therapies. In July 2005, Miller presented data from the Phase III MARINA trial of ranibizumab (Lucentis) at the 23rd Annual Meeting of the American Society of Retina Specialists (ASRS) in Montreal, Canada.

In the annual Breakthrough of the Year awards by the journal Science, anti-VEGF therapy for AMD was recognized as one of the top ten scientific distinctions of the year 2006. In 2014, the Champalimaud Foundation awarded the António Champalimaud Vision Award to Napoleone Ferrara, Joan Miller, Evangelos Gragoudas, Patricia D'Amore, Anthony Adamis, George L. King, and Lloyd Paul Aiello "for the development of anti-angiogenic therapy for retinal disease." Considered the highest distinction in ophthalmology and visual science, the €1 million Champalimaud Vision Award is among the world's largest scientific and humanitarian prizes and often referred to as the "Nobel Prize for Vision."

== Publications ==
Miller's scholarly contributions include more than 150 original research articles, 20 clinical trial reports (as a member of the investigative team), 40 reviews, and 30 book chapters. Miller is an editor of the journal Ophthalmology and several textbooks, including Albert and Jakobiec's Principles and Practice of Ophthalmology (3rd ed), Retinal Disorders: Genetic Approaches to Diagnosis and Treatment, and Endophthalmitis.

== Selected awards and honors ==
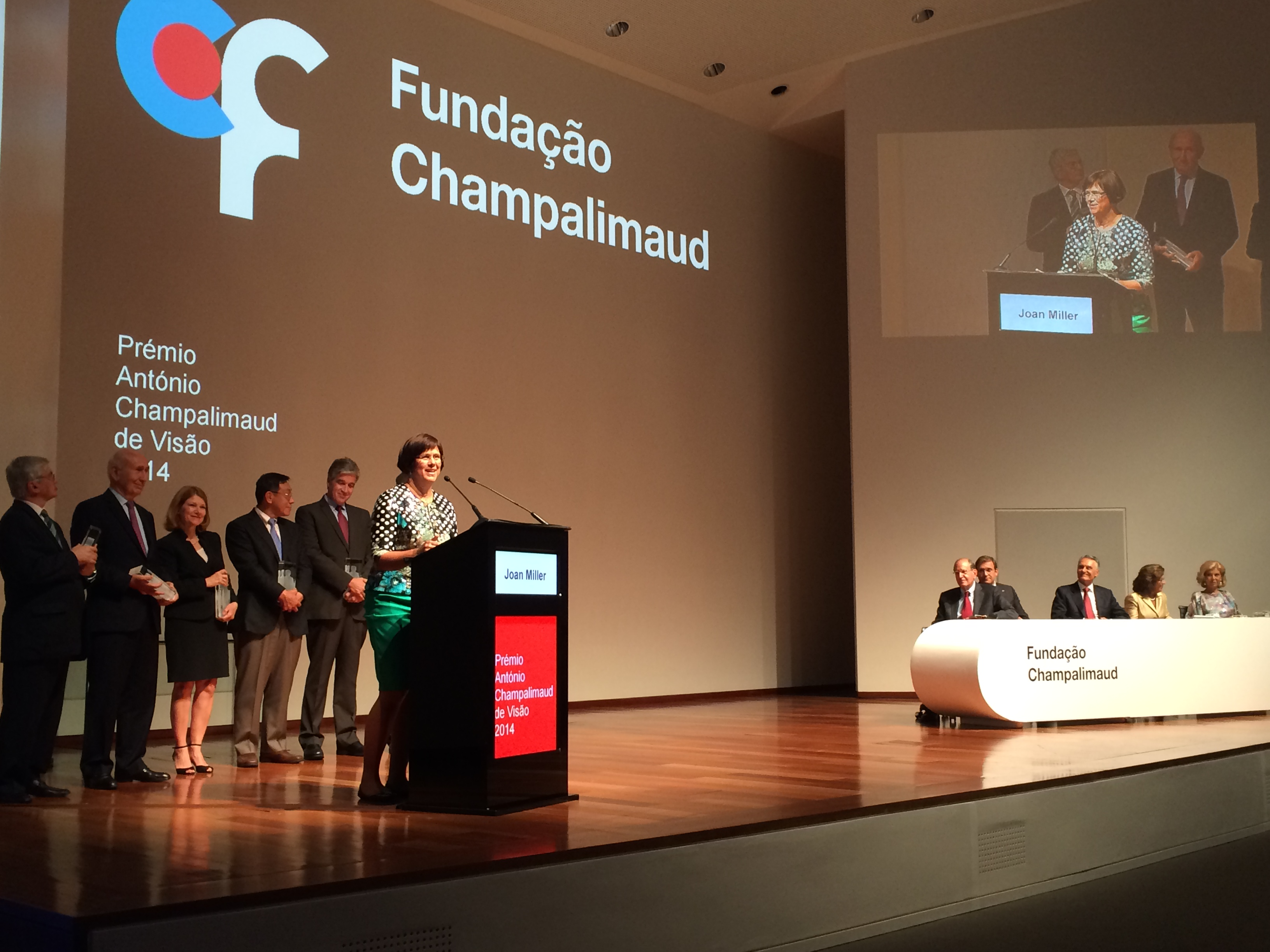
Joan W. Miller speaking at the 2014 António Champalimaud Vision Award ceremony in Lisbon, Portugal, 10 September 2014.

- 1999: Richard and Hinda Rosenthal Award / Young Investigator Award, Macula Society
- 2002: Jules Gonin Lecturer of the Retina Research Foundation, Club Jules Gonin
- 2002: Alcon Research Institute Award
- 2006: ARVO/Pfizer Ophthalmics Translational Research Award, Association for Research in Vision and Ophthalmology (ARVO)
- 2007: Distinguished Old Girl Award (DOGA), Bishop Strachan School
- 2008: American Ophthalmological Society
- 2009: J. Donald Gass Medal for Outstanding Contributions in the Study of Macular Diseases, Macula Society
- 2010: Joseph B. Martin Dean's Leadership Award for the Advancement of Women Faculty, Harvard Medical School
- 2011: Paul Henkind Memorial Lecture, Macula Society
- 2012: Pinnacle Award for Achievement in the Professions, Greater Boston Chamber of Commerce
- 2012: LXIX Edward Jackson Memorial Lecture, American Academy of Ophthalmology
- 2012: Cless Best of the Best Award, Department of Ophthalmology & Visual Sciences, University of Illinois College of Medicine
- 2013: Academia Ophthalmologica Internationalis
- 2014: António Champalimaud Vision Award from the Champalimaud Foundation
- 2015: Gold Fellow, Association for Research in Vision and Ophthalmology (ARVO)
- 2015: Mildred Weisenfeld Award for Excellence in Ophthalmology from Association for Research in Vision and Ophthalmology (ARVO)
- 2015: National Academy of Medicine

== Personal life ==
Miller is married to John B. Miller, a construction attorney and 2014 Republican candidate for Massachusetts Attorney General.
