= Champalimaud Foundation =

Portuguese biomedical research foundation

- D. Anna de Sommer Champalimaud and Dr. Carlos Montez Champalimaud Foundation
- Fundação D. Anna de Sommer Champalimaud e Dr. Carlos Montez Champalimaud
- Abbreviation: Fundação Champalimaud
- Named after: Anna de Sommer Champalimaud and Carlos Montez Champalimaud
- Formation: 17 December 2004
- Founder: António Champalimaud
- Founded at: Belém, Lisbon
- Type: Non-governmental organization
- VAT ID no.: PT507131827
- Registration no.: 507131827
- Legal status: Foundation
- Purpose: Scientific research in the field of medicine
- Headquarters: Centro de Investigação da Fundação Champalimaud, Avenida Brasília, 1400-038 Lisbon, Portugal
- Coordinates: 38°41′36″N 9°13′19″W
- Services: Radiology, Nuclear Medicine, Pathology, Radiation Oncology, Chemotherapy, and Psycho-oncology
- Fields: Medicine
- Official language: Portuguese and English
- President: Leonor Beleza
- Vice-President: João Silveira Botelho
- Director: António Horta Osório
- Key people: António Champalimaud and Leonor Beleza
- Revenue: € 70,234,226 (2018)
- Expenses: € 79,504,954 (2018)
- Endowment: € 500,000,000
- Staff: 550 (2018)
- Award: Honorary Member of the Order of Merit
- Website: www.fchampalimaud.org

The Champalimaud Foundation MHM (Portuguese: Fundação Champalimaud) is a private biomedical research foundation. It was created according to the will of the late entrepreneur António de Sommer Champalimaud, in 2004. The complete name of the foundation honors the mother and father of the founder and is Fundação Anna de Sommer Champalimaud e Dr. Carlos Montez Champalimaud. It is located in the historic riverside area of Belém in Lisbon, Portugal.

== Overview ==
The mission of the Foundation is "to develop programmes of advanced biomedical research and provide clinical care of excellence, with a focus on translating pioneering scientific discoveries into solutions which can improve the quality of life of individuals around the world."

The foundation undertakes research in the fields of neuroscience and oncology at the modernistic Champalimaud Centre for the Unknown in Belém, opened in 2011. Research into visual impairment is undertaken via an outreach program.

The Champalimaud Clinical Center (CCC) is a modern scientific, medical and technological institution providing specialized clinical treatment for oncology. The Center develops advanced programs for research of diseases. The CCC tries to customize the therapies in order to achieve more effectiveness in controlling and treating the diseases. It was designed by Indian architect Charles Correa.

== Centre for the Unknown ==
The Champalimaud Foundation's Centre for the Unknown is a project designed by the Goan architect Charles Correa. It was inaugurated on October 5, 2010.

It is situated on a 65,000-square-metre plot of land located in the riverside area of Pedrouços. It is a privileged location on the bank of the Tagus River, near the Belém Tower, symbolic for being the place from which Portuguese navigators set out five centuries ago toward the "unknown."

The complex includes two main blocks: the research centre / cancer treatment centre, and the auditorium (connected by an elevated walkway). It also has gardens and an open-air amphitheatre.

== Management ==
The management of the Foundation consists of Board of Directors, General Council, Scientific Committee, Ethics Committee and Vision Award Jury. The acting President is Leonor Beleza appointed by António Champalimaud in his will.

== António Champalimaud Vision Award ==
The award was established in 2007 to recognise contributions to research into vision. In even numbered years it is awarded for contributions to overall vision research and in odd numbered years for contributions to the alleviation of visual problems, primarily in developing countries.

=== Recipients ===
Source: Champalimaud Foundation

- 2023: St John of Jerusalem Eye Hospital Group
- 2022: Gerrit Melles and Claes Dohlman, for opening new paths to treat those affected by corneal disease
- 2019: Instituto da Visão – IPEPO, the Altino Ventura Foundation and the UNICAMP Ophthalmology Service, longstanding organisations that have worked to prevent blindness and visual impairment by providing eye services to underserved populations in Brazil
- 2018: Jean Bennett, Albert Maguire, Robin Ali, James Bainbridge, Samuel Jacobson, William W. Hauswirth and Michael Redmond, for the first successful gene therapy to cure an inherited human disease
- 2017: Sightsavers and CBM (Christian Blind Mission), organisations with long and distinguished histories of supporting blindness prevention, alleviation and rehabilitation programmes in developing countries
- 2016: Christine Holt, Carol Mason, John Flanagan and Carla Shatz, for ground-breaking work that has illuminated our understanding of the way in which our eyes send signals to the appropriate areas of the brain
- 2015: Kilimanjaro Centre for Community Ophthalmology (KCCO), Seva Foundation and Seva Canada
- 2014: Napoleone Ferrara, Joan W. Miller, Evangelos S. Gragoudas, Patricia D'Amore, Anthony P. Adamis, George L. King and Lloyd Paul Aiello, for the development of anti-angiogenic therapy for retinal disease
- 2013: Nepal Netra Jyoty Sangh, Eastern Regional Eye Care Programme, Lumbini Eye Institute and Tilganga Institute of Ophthalmology
- 2012: David Williams, for the application of adaptive optics (AO) to the eye; and James Fujimoto, David Huang, Carmen A. Puliafito, Joel S. Schuman & Eric Swanson, for the development of optical coherence tomography (OCT)
- 2011: African Programme for Onchocerciasis Control
- 2010: J. Anthony Movshon and William Newsome
- 2009: Helen Keller International
- 2008: Jeremy Nathans and King-Wai Yau
- 2007: Aravind Eye Care System

== Honours and awards ==
- Honorary Member of the Order of Merit, Portugal (4 September 2019)

== See also ==
- Healthcare in Portugal
- Emergency medical services in Portugal
- List of medicine awards

== Gallery ==
Glass bridge between the two main buildings

Reflecting pool overlooking the Tagus River

Open-air amphitheatre

Covered tropical garden

Exterior of the Botton-Champalimaud Centre

Interior of the Botton-Champalimaud Centre

Lego model of the Champalimaud Centre
