= Gabi Hollows =

Australian orthoptist

Gabrielle Beryl Hollows AO (née O'Sullivan; 21 May 1953) is an Australian orthoptist. An Australian Living Treasure, she has also been awarded the Advance Australia Award for Community Service, and made Paul Harris Fellow by Rotary International. She was married to the Australian ophthalmologist Fred Hollows from 1980 until his death in 1993.

== Early life ==
Hollows was born in Newcastle, New South Wales, and raised on an orchard near Gosford on the Central Coast of New South Wales. She first became interested in medicine when she had eye surgery at the age of three.

== Career ==
In 1972, Hollows graduated as an orthoptist from the NSW School of Orthoptics, specialising in disorders of eye movements and associated vision problems. During her orthoptic training she met Fred Hollows and joined him on the National Trachoma and Eye Health Program which aimed to survey and treat Aboriginal and Torres Strait Islander Australians suffering eye conditions including trachoma. Over a period of three years, they visited over 465 remote communities and treated more than 100,000 people. They married in 1980 and had five children. She worked with Fred until his death in 1993, and continued his work afterwards through The Fred Hollows Foundation, both overseas and in Australia. In 1996, she married lawyer John Balazs.

== Awards and honours ==
In 2001, Hollows was awarded the Centenary Medal for services to community welfare and development.

In the 2013 Queens Birthday Honours List, Gabi Hollows was made an Officer of the Order of Australia (AO) for "distinguished service to public health as an advocate for the eradication of blindness, particularly for Indigenous Australians and people in the developing world."

In the 2021 Impact 25 Awards, Gabi Hollows was named one of the top 25 Australians creating positive change. She was also awarded the Judge's Choice Award for Collaboration.

== Sources ==
- Gabi Hollows – Founding Director – biography at The Fred Hollows Foundation website
- Gabi Hollows: a conversation – 27 May 2005 (abc.net.au)
