= Sanduk Ruit =

Nepalese ophthalmologist

- सन्दुक रूइत
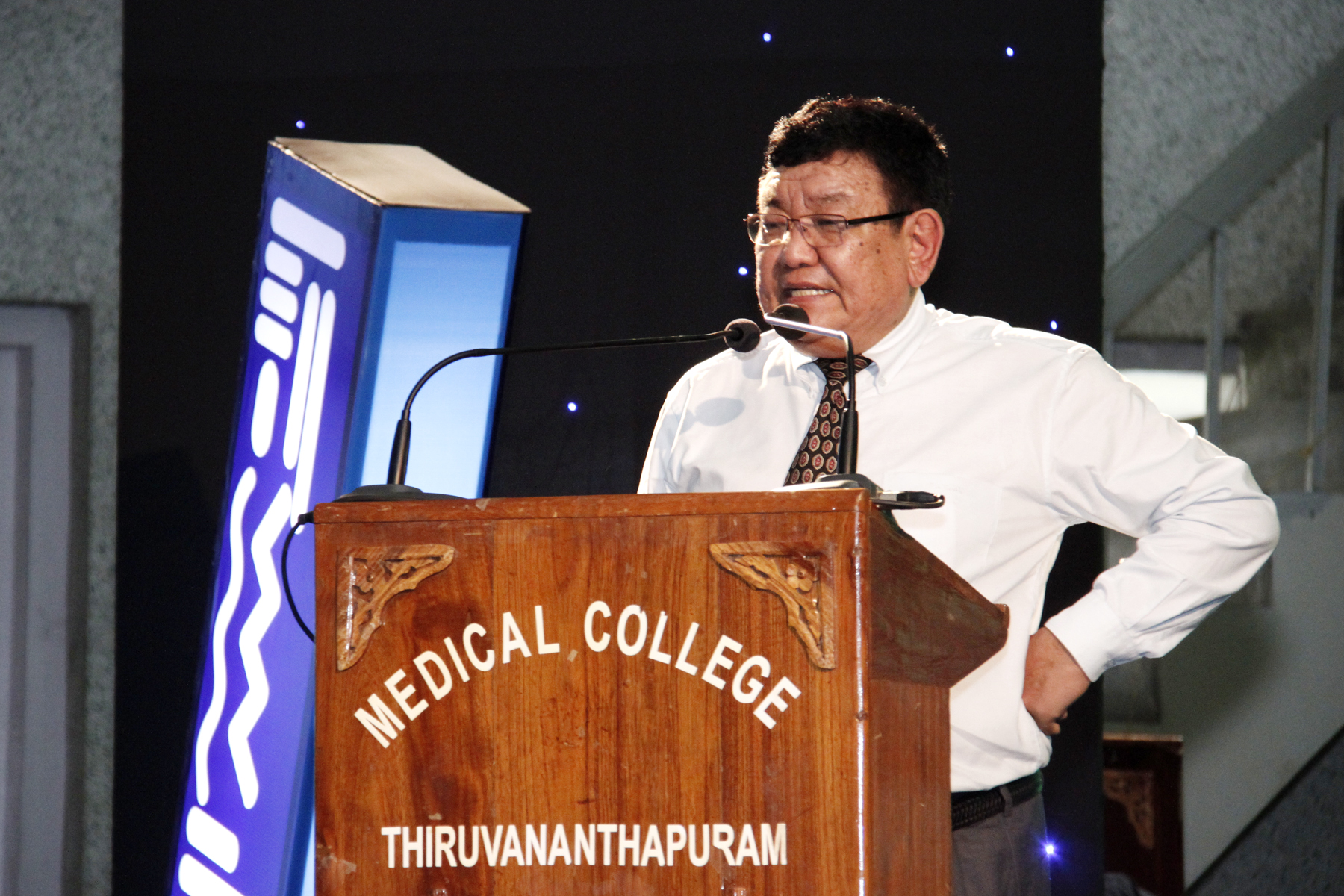
- Ruit in 2011
- Born: September 4, 1954 (age 72); Olangchung Gola, Nepal
- Education: King George's Medical College; AIIMS New Delhi
- Occupation: Ophthalmologist
- Office: Founder and Executive Director of Tilganga Institute of Ophthalmology
- Spouse: Nanda Ruit
- Children: 3
- Awards: Honorary Officer of the Order of Australia; Ramon Magsaysay Award; Prince Mahidol Award; National Order of Merit of Bhutan; Asia Game Changer Award; Padma Shri; Genius 100; ISA Award for Service to Humanity
- Medical career
- Sub-specialties: Cornea and Cataract
- Website: tilganga.org

Dr. Sanduk Ruit (Nepali: सन्दुक रूइत; pronounced [ˈsʌnduk rui̯t]) is an ophthalmologist from Nepal who has helped restore the sight of over 250,000 people across North America, Africa and Asia using small-incision cataract surgery (RUITECTOMY) and Phacoemulsification cataract surgery.

Ruit is the founder and the executive director of the Tilganga Institute of Ophthalmology, which manufactures intraocular lenses for surgical implantation at a fraction of the previous manufacturing cost. The low cost has made cataract surgeries slightly cheaper in Nepal.

Ruit has been referred to as the "God of Sight", a moniker that he earned after restoring the sight of a 60-year-old woman through cataract surgery in Indonesia.

He was awarded the Ramon Magsaysay Award for Peace and International Understanding, considered to be the Asian equivalent of the Nobel Prize, for "placing Nepal at the forefront of developing safe, effective, and economical procedures for cataract surgery, enabling the needlessly blind in even the poorest countries to see again."

He was awarded with the ISA award, the highest civilian award in Bahrain by the king of Bahrain for developing highly affordable and sustainable ways to cure cataracts throughout the developing world with a cash prize of 1 million dollars.

== Early life and education ==
Ruit was born on September 4, 1954, to rural, illiterate parents, father Sonam Ruit and mother Kesang Ruit, in the remote mountainous village Olangchunggola near the border with Tibet in northeast Nepal. His village of 200 people was located 11,000 feet above sea level on the lap of the world's third-highest peak, Mt. Kanchenjunga. It is one of the most remote regions of Nepal with no electricity, school, health facilities or modern means of communication, and lies blanketed under snow for six to nine months a year. Ruit's family made a subsistence living from small agriculture, petty trading and livestock farming.

Ruit was the second of his parents' six children. He lost three siblings – an elder brother to diarrhoea at age three and younger sister Chundak to fever at age eight. In many interviews, Ruit has mentioned that for him, the most painful was his younger sister Yangla's death. Yangla was his childhood companion, and he developed a special bond with her over the years. She died at 15 of tuberculosis as the family was too poor to afford treatment that could have saved her life. In many interviews, Ruit has said that this loss made a strong mark on him and instilled in him a resolve to become a doctor and work for the poor who would not otherwise have access to healthcare.

The nearest school from his village was fifteen days' walk away in Darjeeling. His father, a small-time businessman, sent Ruit to St Robert's School in Darjeeling at the age of seven, and provided financial support for his early medical career. Ruit's life in Darjeeling was hard as he was away from his parents and home for about four to five years. After a few years, he returned to Nepal and continued his study. In 1969, Ruit graduated from Siddhartha Vanasthali School in Kathmandu, Nepal, and later was further educated in India.

He received MBBS degree from King George's Medical College, Lucknow, with a scholarship from 1972 to 1976. Ruit then returned to Nepal and worked as a General Physician in Bir Hospital, Kathmandu for three years. Later he wanted to specialize in ophthalmology, so he continued his studies at the All India Institute of Medical Sciences, New Delhi with a scholarship, and achieved his Master's degree. After three years in 1984, he returned to Nepal and worked in an eye hospital in Tripureshwor for eight years. Meanwhile Australian ophthalmologist Fred Hollows was in Nepal as a mentor, selected by WHO. He noticed Ruit's work and determination and offered him further study about cataract surgery in Australia in 1986. Ruit further studied in Australia, the Netherlands and the United States.

== Early career and marriage ==
While in Australia, Ruit gained further deep specialization in eye surgery. Ruit and Hollows created the Small Incision Cataract Surgery (SICS), which used intraocular lenses, and Ruit became the first Nepali doctor to use intraocular lenses. To gain donations to make eye surgeries more affordable and accessible in Nepal, he established Nepal Eye Program Australia, later renamed The Fred Hollows Foundation. He was offered to stay and work in Australia, but he returned to Nepal and continued to work at Tripureshwor Eye Hospital.He created the Nepal Eye Bank in 1996 located in a hospital in Kathmandu to collect corneas for transplant surgeries. At first donations were slow due to fear among the Hindu and Buddhist population that if they donated their corneas they would reincarnate blind. He worked with Hindu and Buddhist religious leaders to convince people that their physical bodies would not affect reincarnation and that donating would actually increase their karma.

Ruit married Nanda Shrestha, an ophthalmic nurse, in 1987. He has one son and two daughters.

== Accomplishments ==
Working in Australia in 1986, Ruit and Fred Hollows developed a strategy for using inexpensive intraocular lenses to bring small-incision cataract surgery to the developing world. However, the lenses remained too expensive for many cataract patients. In 1995, Ruit developed a new intraocular lens that could be produced far more cheaply and which, as of 2010, is used in over 60 countries. Ruit's method is now taught in U.S. medical schools. Despite being far cheaper, Ruit's method has the same success rate as Western techniques: 98% at six months. In 1994, Dr. Ruit founded the Tilganga Eye Center, now called the Tilganga Institute of Ophthalmology, in Kathmandu. It aims to provide eye care at an affordable price. The institute works closely with the Himalayan Cataract Project, which Ruit Co-founded with his colleague Geoff Tabin, and other organizations to give cataract surgery to people in some of the world's most perilous and inaccessible locations, frequently for free. Tilganga has performed over 100,000 operations, trained over 500 medical personnel from around the world, and produces Ruit's intraocular lenses at a cost of less than US $5 each. It also produces prosthetic eyes for US $3, compared to imports that cost $150. For those unable to reach the centre or who live in otherwise isolated rural areas, Ruit and his team set up mobile eye camps, often using tents, classrooms, and even animal stables as makeshift operating rooms.

After treating a North Korean diplomat in Kathmandu, Ruit persuaded North Korean authorities to let him visit in 2006. There he conducted surgery on 1000 patients and trained many local surgeons.

In April 2021, Ruit launched the Tej Kohli & Ruit Foundation with a mission to screen 1,000,000 people and cure 300,000 of cataract blindness by 2026. In March 2021, the foundation conducted its first microsurgical outreach camp in the Lumbini region of Nepal, where it screened 1,387 patients and cured 312 of blindness. Another camp in the Solukhumbu region screened 1,214 patients and cured 178 of blindness in April 2021.

== Media coverage ==
- "Surgeon Dr Sanduk Ruit revolutionizing cataract surgery gives sight to thousands", 2018 feature story by Miranda Wood on The Daily Telegraph
- A 2006 National Geographic documentary Inside North Korea documented not only Ruit's surgery in the highly controlled country but also the resulting overt adulation by the patients given to the then-Supreme Leader of the Democratic People's Republic of Korea Kim Jong-il.
- Ruit's work in Nepal featured in Episode 5 (Mountains – Life in Thin Air) of the 2010 BBC documentary series Human Planet.
- Out of the Darkness, a 2011 film by Italian director Stefano Levi, documents Ruit's work in remote Northern Nepal.
- In 2015, Ruit and his work were featured in a New York Times op-ed by Nicholas Kristof: "In 5 Minutes, He Lets the Blind See". The article was based on reporting in Nepal by Kristof and Austin Meyer, a graduate journalism student at Stanford University, during the trip with the winner of the 2015 New York Times Win a Trip with Nick Kristof contest.
- ABC Radio interview for ABC Conversations, "The doctor known as the 'God of Sight'", by Richard Fidler (2018)"
- CBS News article by Bill Whitaker, "Restoring eyesight with a simple, inexpensive surgery" (2017)
- CNN article "Sight for sore eyes: 'Maverick' doctor who restored the vision of 100,000 people" by Sophie Brown (2014)
- CNN photos "Nepal Miracle Eye Doctor heals 100,000" (2014)
- National Geographic documentary "Miracle Doctors: Curing Blindness"
- Al Jazeera documentary "The Gift of Sight" (2014)
- Reuters feature "Nepal's 'magic' surgeon brings light back to poor" (2012)
- Mini documentary by Great Big Story "This Surgeon Has Restored Sight to 130,000 of Nepal's Blind" (2019)
- Daily US Times feature "Nas Daily Discovers Dr. Sanduk Ruit: He Is The God Of Sight" (2020)

Ruit's biography, The Barefoot Surgeon by Australian writer Ali Gripper, was published in June 2018. A Nepali translation Sanduk Ruit was published by Fine Print Books in 2019.

== Awards and honors ==
- In May 2007, Ruit was appointed an Honorary Officer of the Order of Australia "for service to humanity by establishing eye care services in Nepal and surrounding countries, and for his work in teaching and training surgeons and technical innovation".
- In June 2006, he was awarded the Ramon Magsaysay Award for International Understanding.

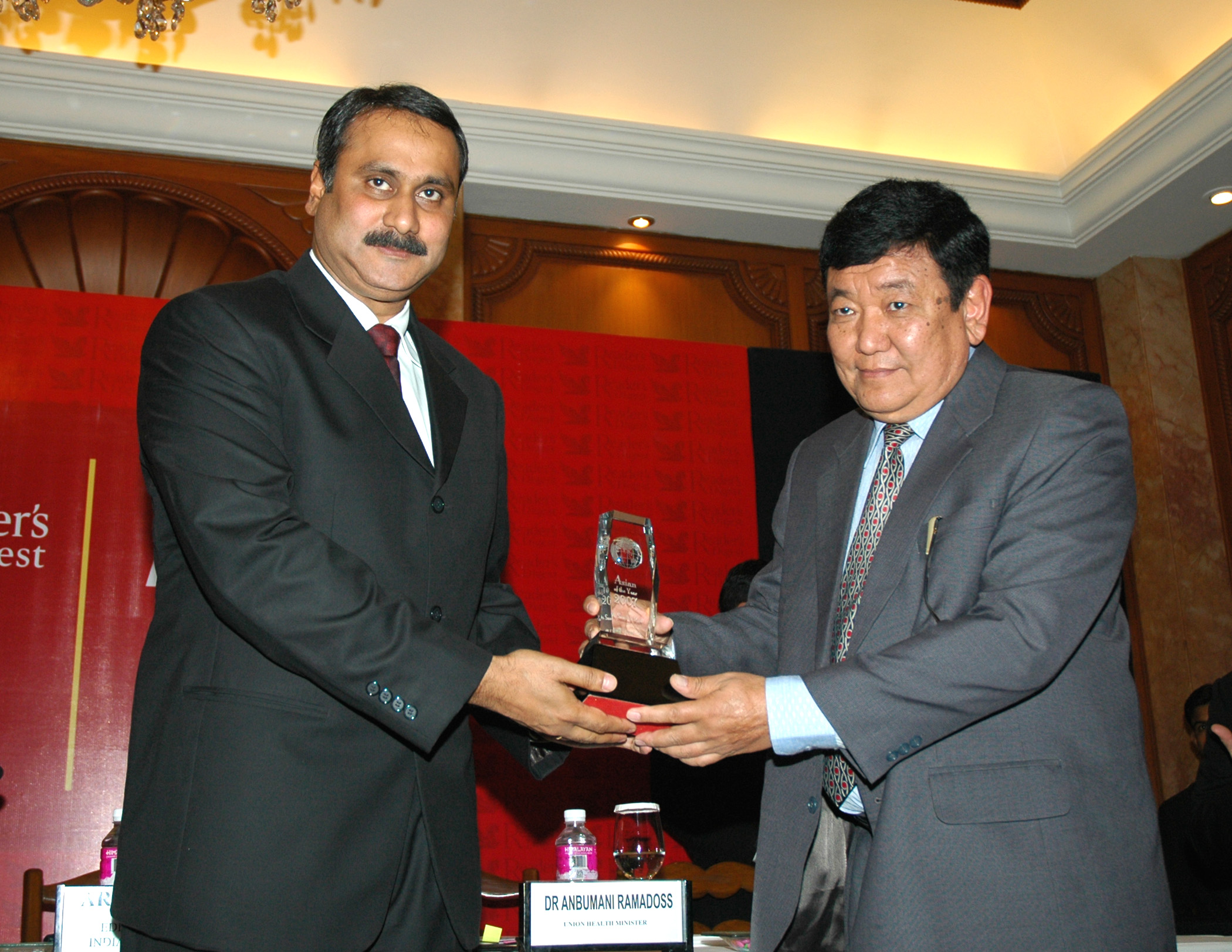
Ruit receiving the Asian of the year award

- On March 5, 2007, he was awarded the Asian of the Year 2007 by the Union Minister of Health and Family Welfare, Dr. Anbumani Ramadoss, in New Delhi.
- He was also awarded with Prince Mahidol Award of Thailand.
- Asteroid 83362 Sandukruit, discovered by Bill Yeung in 2001, was named in his honor. The official naming citation was published by the Minor Planet Center on 30 March 2010 (M.P.C. 69494).
- On December 17, 2015, he was conferred with the National Order of Merit of Bhutan [in Gold].
- On October 27, 2016, he received an Asia Game Changer Award from the Asia Society "for bringing the gifts of sight and productive life to those most in need."
- In 2018, the Government of India awarded him the Padma Shri, its fourth highest civilian award, for “[his] innovation in the 1980s [that] led to a 90 per cent reduction in the cost of cataract eye surgery, provides low-cost cataract surgery lenses to over thirty countries.”
- In 2019, the Government of Nepal honoured him with Prime Minister National Talent Award for his contribution to the field of ophthalmology.
- In September 2020, the Nepal Government announced that Dr. Sanduk Ruit will be honoured with Suprasiddha Prabal Janasewashree (first).Govt announces list of 594 persons for state honours
- On February 21, 2023, Dr Sanduk Ruit was awarded the prestigious ISA award for service to humanity amid a programme held at the ISA Cultural Centre in Manama, Bahrain. The King of Bahrain, His Majesty Hamad bin Isa Al Khalifa handed Dr. Ruit $1 million during the royal ceremony."
- A species of groundhopper (Orthoptera: Tetrigidae) discovered from Shivapuri Nagarjun National Park by a team led by Nepali researcher Madan Subedi has been named after Dr. Sanduk Ruit as Hebarditettix sanduki Subedi, Kasalo, & Skejo, 2024.
- In 2023 Ruit was awarded an honorary Doctorate in Science by the United Kingdom's Anglia Ruskin University.
