= Clifford Tabin =

American geneticist

Cliff Tabin
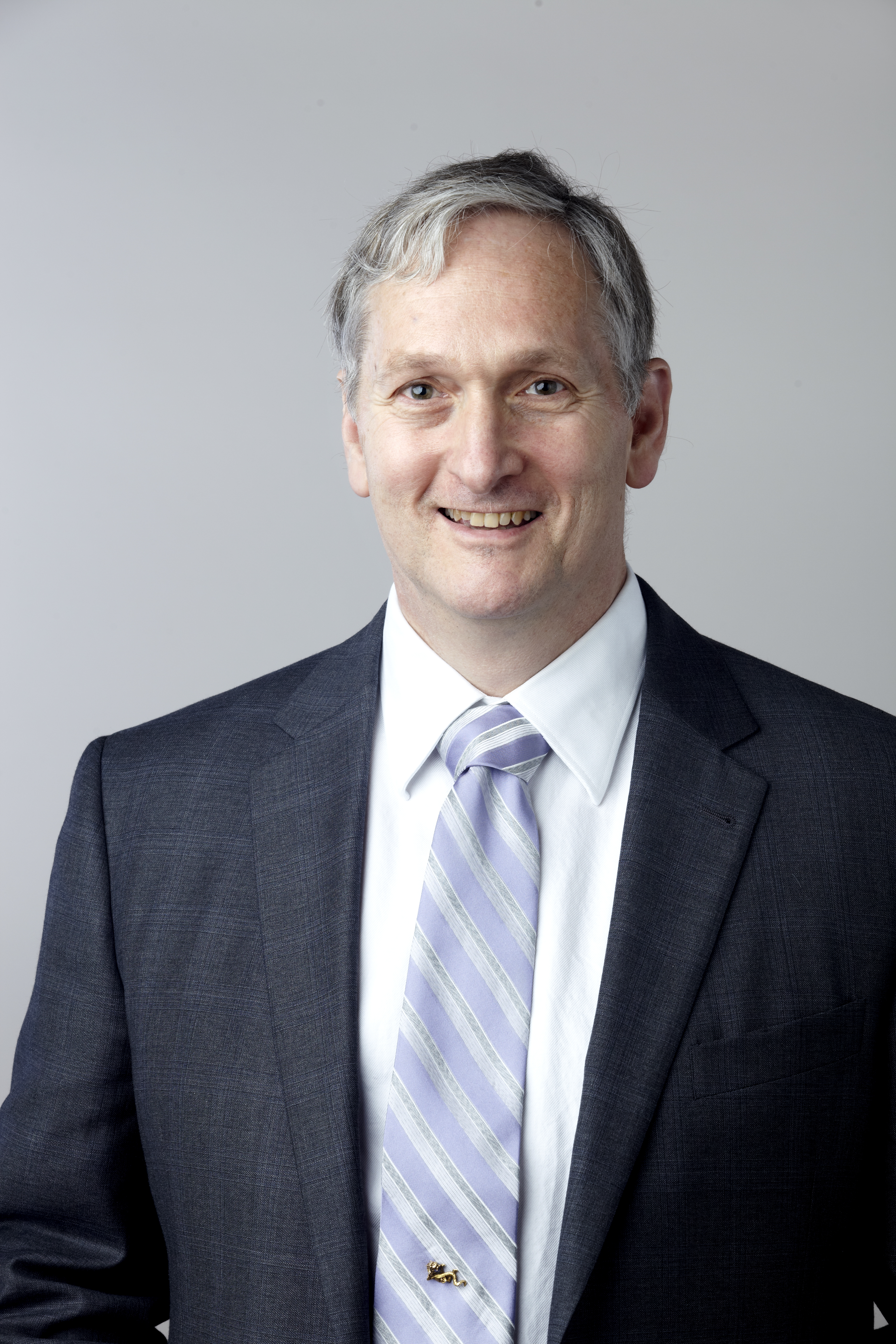
- Cliff Tabin in 2014, portrait via the Royal Society
- Born: Clifford James Tabin; January 19, 1954 (age 72); Glencoe, Illinois
- Education: University of Chicago (BS); Massachusetts Institute of Technology (PhD)
- Known for: Sonic hedgehog
- Parent: Julius Tabin
- Awards: ForMemRS (2014); Conklin Medal (2012); March of Dimes Prize (2008); Membership of the NAS (2007); NAS Award in Molecular Biology (1999)
- Scientific career
- Fields: Genetics; Oncogenes; Hedgehog signaling pathway
- Institutions: Harvard University; Massachusetts General Hospital; Harvard Medical School
- Thesis: Activation of the c-Ha-ras Oncogene (1984)
- Doctoral advisor: Robert Weinberg
- Website: genetics.med.harvard.edu/tabin/; genetics.med.harvard.edu/faculty/tabin

Clifford James Tabin (born 1954) is chairman of the Department of Genetics at Harvard Medical School.

== Education ==
Tabin was educated at the University of Chicago where he was awarded a BS in physics in 1976. He went on to graduate school at Massachusetts Institute of Technology and was awarded a PhD in 1984 for work on the regulation of gene expression in the Ras subfamily of oncogenes supervised by Robert Weinberg based in the MIT Department of Biology. In Weinberg's lab, Tabin constructed murine leukemia virus, the first recombinant retrovirus that could be used as a eukaryotic vector.

== Career ==
Following his PhD, Tabin did postdoctoral research with Douglas A. Melton at Harvard University, then moved to Massachusetts General Hospital where he worked on the molecular biology of limb development. He was appointed to the faculty in the Department of Genetics at Harvard Medical School in 1989, and promoted to full professor in 1997 and chairman of the department in January 2007.

== Entrepreneurial activities ==
In 2023, Dr. Cliff Tabin co-founded Somite Therapeutics, a biotechnology company that integrates artificial intelligence with stem cell biology to develop novel cell replacement therapies.

== Research ==
As of 2014 Tabin's research investigates the genetic regulation of vertebrate development, combining classical methods of experimental embryology with modern molecular and genetic techniques for regulating gene expression during embryogenesis.

Previously Tabin has worked on retroviruses, homeobox genes, oncogenes, developmental biology and evolution. Early in his research he investigated limb regeneration in the salamander, and described the expression of retinoic acid receptor and Hox genes in the blastema. Comparative studies by Ann Burke in his lab showed that differences in boundaries of Hox gene expression correlated with differences in skeletal morphology. The Tabin laboratory adjoins the laboratory of Connie Cepko.

== Awards and honors ==
Tabin was elected a Foreign Member of the Royal Society (ForMemRS) in 2014. His nomination reads:

Tabin has made fundamental discoveries on embryonic development and evolution. A critical turning point in the history of developmental biology was the identification of the first known secreted morphogen, Sonic hedgehog. He clarified how morphogens like Shh orchestrate formation of the embryo, elucidating why the heart is located on the left and not the right side of the body and explaining why the thumb is different from the little finger. This provided critical insight into the origins of human congenital malformations. He has also solved important evolutionary riddles including the causes of variations in beak shape in Darwin's finches.

Tabin has also been awarded the Edwin Conklin Medal in 2012, the March of Dimes Prize in Developmental Biology jointly with Philip A. Beachy in 2008 and the NAS Award in Molecular Biology in 1999. He was elected a member of the National Academy of Sciences in 2007 and the American Academy of Arts and Sciences in 2000. He was elected a Member of the American Philosophical Society in 2019.

== Personal life ==
Tabin is the son of Julius Tabin, a nuclear physicist who worked with Enrico Fermi on the Manhattan Project in Los Alamos National Laboratory in New Mexico during World War II. He has a brother, Geoff Tabin, and two children. Tabin appears as himself in a BBC Horizon programme titled Hopeful Monsters.
