= Nicole Grasset =

Swiss virologist (1927–2009)

- Born: 18 April 1927; Garches, France
- Died: 29 August 2009 (aged 82)
- Known for: Eradicating Smallpox
- Scientific career
- Fields: Epidemiology, Virology
- Workplaces: World Health Organization

Nicole Grasset (18 April 1927 – 29 August 2009) was a Swiss-French medical virologist and microbiologist-epidemiologist. Grasset was the senior smallpox advisor for the South-East Asia Regional Office (SEARO) of the World Health Organization (WHO) from 1971 through the end of the WHO smallpox eradication campaign.

== Early life ==
Grasset was the daughter of a famous Swiss microbiologist. She grew up in South Africa. After studying medicine, she worked at the Pasteur Institute in Paris.

At age 20, she wrote a 'Plan of Life,' her life's mission statement that outlined many of the goals that she would come to achieve.

== Career ==
=== Eradication of smallpox ===
Grasset served as SEARO's principal smallpox adviser and held this post through the achievement and certification of eradication in India and Nepal. She joined the program after working as a Red Cross adviser, a role in which she provided vaccination and medical care in the Nigerian civil war zone of Biafra.

Grasset was charged with coordinating work carried out by the states of SEARO, collecting information and developing policies. The eradication unit set up teams of international and Indian workers, who were given the responsibility of going into the states, searching for cases, and performing containment and vaccination strategies.

She was known for her leadership and strong-willed personality. D.A. Henderson, the person in charge of the World Health Organization eradication unit, described her as an "energetic, determined, charismatic leader". Henderson recounts that, aside from the nursing staff, she was the only woman in the entire regional office.

In 1977, the last case of smallpox was in reported in Somalia. The smallpox eradication campaign had come to a successful conclusion

=== Later work ===
After working on smallpox eradication with people like Larry Brilliant, Grasset went on to help advise the creation of Brilliant's nonprofit organization, the Seva Foundation.

== Legacy ==
Referring to her spirit of public service and her impeccable dress-ups, she has been called "one of the great saints, a mother Teresa in a Dior dress".
