= Geoff Tabin =

American ophthalmologist

- Born: Geoffrey Craig Tabin; July 3, 1956 (age 70); Glencoe, Illinois
- Education: Yale University (BA); Oxford University (MA); Harvard University (MD)
- Parent(s): Julius Tabin and Johanna Tabin
- Relatives: Cliff Tabin (brother)
- Awards: American Alpine Club Honorary Membership (2024); ASCRS Foundation Chang-Crandall Humanitarian Award; George H.W. Bush Lifetime of Leadership Award (2017); Dalai Lama's "Unsung Hero of Compassion" (2009); American Academy of Ophthalmology's Outstanding Humanitarian Service Award (2008)
- Website: med.stanford.edu/profiles/geoffrey-tabin; profiles.stanford.edu/geoffrey-tabin

Geoffrey Craig Tabin (born 1956) is the Fairweather Foundation Professor at Stanford University School of Medicine and the co-founder of the Himalayan Cataract Project along with Dr. Sanduk Ruit.

Geoff Tabin is the son of Julius Tabin, a PhD in Physics who worked on the Manhattan Project and later became a patent attorney in Chicago, who had among his many clients the Salk Institute of La Jolla (San Diego, California). His mother, Johanna Tabin, was a psychotherapist who trained with Anna Freud and received a life-time achievement award from the American Psychological Association. He is also the brother of Cliff Tabin. Dr. Tabin graduated from Yale College where he was a two-time captain of the Yale Varsity tennis team. After Yale he earned a M.A. in philosophy at Oxford as a Marshall Scholar. Dr. Tabin received his M.D. from Harvard Medical School before completing his ophthalmology residency at Brown University and a fellowship in corneal diseases and surgery at Melbourne University in Australia. His roommate at University College, Oxford was Mauricio Gonzalez Sfeir. They both earned varsity Blues in tennis and together initiated the Oxford tradition of spring break trips to Spain. While at Oxford, Geoff Tabin, along with members of the Oxford Dangerous Sports club, came up with the idea for, and then performed the world's first Bungee Jump. Dr. Tabin is an avid mountaineer who has made many first ascents, including being part of the first ascent of the Kangshung Face of Mount Everest in 1983, and in 1990 he became the fourth person to reach the top of the Seven Summits.

While mountaineering in Nepal, he was inspired by cataract surgeries performed by a Dutch team. Along with fellow ophthalmologist, Dr. Sanduk Ruit, Dr. Tabin founded the Himalayan Cataract Project in 1995 which works to eradicate preventable and curable blindness both by performing surgeries and by training local doctors across 30 countries. As of 2024, HCP has performed over 1.6 million surgeries and trained over 20 thousand Doctors and Nurses.

== Books ==
- Blind Corners (1993)
- Corneal Transplantation (2002)
- Clinical Practice in Small Incision Cataract Surgery (2004)
- Fighting Global Blindness (2006)
