= Himalayan Cataract Project =

U.S. nonprofit organization

Himalayan Cataract Project, Inc.
- Formation: 1995
- Founder: Geoffrey Tabin & Sanduk Ruit
- Type: Non-governmental Organization
- Headquarters: Waterbury, Vermont
- Chairman: Geoffrey Tabin
- Website: www.cureblindness.org

The Himalayan Cataract Project (HCP) was created in 1995 by Dr. Geoffrey Tabin and Dr. Sanduk Ruit with a goal of establishing a sustainable eye care infrastructure in the Himalaya. HCP empowers local doctors to provide ophthalmic care through skills-transfer and education. From its beginning, HCP responds to a pressing need for eye care in the Himalayan region. With programs in Nepal, Ethiopia, Ghana, Bhutan and India they have been able to restore sight to over 1.4 million people since 1995.

== Background ==
According to WHO estimates, the most common causes of blindness around the world in 2002 were:

1. cataracts (47.9%),
2. glaucoma (12.3%),
3. age-related macular degeneration (8.7%),
4. corneal opacity (5.1%), and
5. diabetic retinopathy (4.8%),
6. childhood blindness (3.9%),
7. trachoma (3.6%)
8. onchocerciasis (0.8%).

== Objectives ==
- Teach ophthalmic care at all levels
- Establish a first-rate eye care infrastructure through creating centers of excellence and mentoring facilities
- Making all facilities financially self-sustaining
- Addressing eye care from the public health level up to subspecialty care

In 1993, there were 15,000 cataract surgeries performed in Nepal, only 1000 of which utilized intraocular lenses. Most of these 1000 modern surgeries were performed by HCP's co-director, Dr. Sanduk Ruit, who brought microsurgery with intraocular lens technology to the region. Before this technology, cataract surgery consisted of intracapsular cataract extraction, in which the entire lens and capsule are removed from the eye and the patient is given cumbersome thick eyeglasses that provide no peripheral vision and distorted direct vision. At that time, the second and third leading etiologies of blindness after cataracts were aphakia due to the loss of these thick glasses, and failed cataract surgery.

In contrast, in 2017, over 600,000 cataract surgeries were performed in over 16 countries and over 98 percent were done with microsurgery and lens implants. Nepal is the only country in the Himalayan region performing more cataract surgery than the annual rate of new cataract blindness.

== Cost-recovery program ==
All of the Himalayan Cataract Project's facilities strive to be completely financially self-sustaining through a unique cost-recovery program in which the wealthy patients subsidize the poor patients.

One-third of the patients pay the full US$100 for a complete work-up, modern cataract surgery, and all post-operative care. Twenty percent of the patients pay a smaller amount based on what they are able to pay. The remaining third of the patients receive the cataract surgical care entirely free. With this model, the facilities are able to cover all costs.

== Tilganga Institute of Ophthalmology ==
Tilganga Institute of Ophthalmology (TIOC) is the flagship of the Nepal Eye Program and the current facility was opened in 1994. It is a non-profit, community based, non-government organization that is committed to providing eye care services and implementing the Vision 2020 concept of elimination of avoidable blindness. TEC's goal is to act as a model for treatment, research and training, in cooperation with all other eye care centres and organizations in Nepal.

== Dr. Sanduk Ruit ==
Dr. Sanduk Ruit grew up in a remote village in Eastern Nepal. He attended school in India and completed his three-year ophthalmology residency at the All India Institute of Medical Sciences in Delhi, India. He also completed fellowships in microsurgery in the Netherlands and Australia as well as additional ophthalmic training at the Wilmer Eye Institute of the Johns Hopkins University School of Medicine and the University of Michigan. In 1986 Ruit met Professor Fred Hollows from Sydney, Australia while Hollows visited Nepal as a World Health Organization consultant. He went on to study with him for 14 months at Sydney's Prince of Wales Hospital. Hollows was Ruit's mentor and inspiration in the work that he does.

When Ruit returned to Nepal he was instrumental in the formation of the Nepal Eye Program and worked on a large epidemiological survey of blindness in Nepal. He was the first Nepali doctor to perform cataract surgery with intraocular lens implants and pioneered the use of microsurgical extra-capsular cataract extraction with posterior chamber lens implants in remote eye camps. Although other important international organizations sponsored eye camps in the region providing eye care and training local ophthalmologists, the camps established by Ruit were the first to introduce the use of intraocular lenses in cataract surgery. Put simply, this is the removal of the cataract and insertion of a plastic intraocular lens.

== Dr. Geoffrey Tabin ==
Dr. Geoffrey Tabin is Professor of Ophthalmology and Global Medicine at Stanford University and the Byers Eye Institute. He graduated from Yale University and earned a master's degree in philosophy at Oxford on a Marshall Scholarship. He received his MD from Harvard Medical School in 1985. His background in philosophy and ideas of improving health care delivery came together after a climbing trip to Nepal on which he became the first ophthalmologist to summit Mt. Everest.

Tabin spends at least three months per year in Asia working with his Nepalese counterparts directing Tilganga Eye Centre's efforts to provide an international standard of eye care and participating in the outreach programs. As the director of the Himalayan Cataract Project, he has over ten years experience administering an international charitable organization. He is a leader in both the local ophthalmologic community and the American Academy of Ophthalmology. In 2008, during his tenure at the University of Utah School of Medicine, Dr. Tabin received the distinguished Outstanding Humanitarian Service Award given by the American Academy of Ophthalmology in recognition of his international humanitarian efforts.

== In Print ==
In June 2013, Random House released a book written by David Oliver Relin, (co-author of Three Cups of Tea) which shines a light on the work of Himalayan Cataract Project ophthalmologists, Dr. Geoffrey Tabin and Dr. Sanduk Ruit.

== Recognition ==
In the December 2009 issue of National Geographic Adventure magazine the feature story (entitled "The Visionary") featured Tabin and his work with HCP.

== See also ==
- Seva Foundation, a similar charity
