= Charles Malpas =

Australian inventor

- Born: Charles Henry Malpas; 28 April 1899; Leicester, England
- Died: 1 January 1982 (aged 82); Leopold, Victoria

Charles Henry Malpas (28 April 1899 – 1 January 1982) was an Australian inventor and businessman.

Malpas was born in Leicester, England to toolmaker Charles Edward Malpas and Florence, née Merry. He served in the Royal Air Force from April 1918 to February 1919. He married the clerk Elsie Moore at Sutton Coldfield on 31 July 1920, and the couple moved to Melbourne in March 1921. After the death of a daughter in 1924, Elsie returned to England and the two were divorced in 1935. Malpas remarried Betty Meryl Cutler at Geelong on 14 September 1935. He had founded an iron foundry and engineering workshop in 1933 which became known as Victorian Diemoulders Pty Ltd, and he served on Geelong City Council from 1944 to 1947 and from 1949 to 1956.

Malpas' inventions included drum spouts, pourers for drinks and heating-oil gauges, although his most famous creation was the "Airlesflo" tap and seal for packaged liquids, which contributed to the development of wine casks for commercial sale. This was developed for Penfolds' "Tablecask" in 1967, and Malpas designed several prototypes, which he patented. The rights to the Airlesflo tap were bought by Wynn Winegrowers in 1970 and became the standard for bulk wine packaging. In 1980 he was one of the first winners of the Advance Australia Award.

He retired in 1978 and died in 1982 at Leopold, Victoria, survived by his wife, their daughter and two sons.
