= Seva Foundation =

American non-profit international health organization

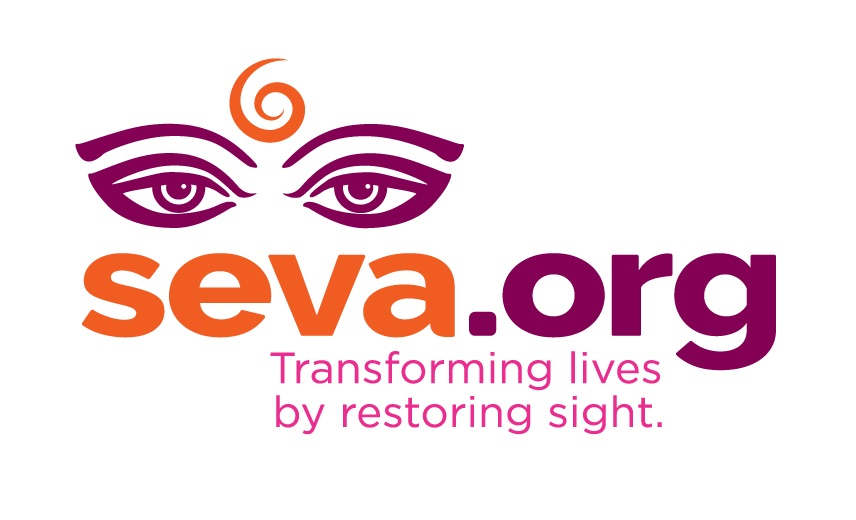
- Formation: 1978
- Type: INGO
- Purpose: Prevention of blindness.
- Headquarters: 1786 Fifth Street
- Location: Berkeley, California, United States
- Region served: Worldwide
- Executive Director: Kate Moynihan
- Website: www.seva.org

Seva Foundation is an international non-profit health organization based in Berkeley, California, known for preventing and treating blindness and other visual impairments. It was co-founded in 1978 by Dr. Larry Brilliant, Ram Dass, Wavy Gravy, Nicole Grasset and Govindappa Venkataswamy. Steve Jobs served as an early adviser and major contributor.

Seva works with local communities in more than 20 countries around the world to develop locally-run, culturally appropriate, self-sustaining programs to increase access to eye care. Seva works with local eye health hospitals and clinics in central Asia, southeast Asia, Eastern Europe, Latin America, and throughout sub-Saharan Africa. The foundation also works with Native communities in North America through its American Indian Sight Initiative.

== History ==
Seva Foundation, based in Berkeley, California, was founded in 1978 by public health expert Larry Brilliant, spiritual leader Ram Dass and humanitarian activist Wavy Gravy. Other co-founders include Dr. Govindappa Venkataswamy, founder of the Aravind Eye Foundation, and Nicole Grasset, the senior adviser for the World Health Organization smallpox eradication campaign. Steve Jobs also participated as an adviser at early Seva meetings and provided the first significant cash donation along with an Apple II to enter and analyze eye care survey results in the original Nepal program.

According to the Seva Foundation's website, "Seva (pronounced Say-Va) is a Sanskrit word meaning 'selfless service to others' and came to represent for us the dream of relieving suffering and reducing poverty in the most effective ways possible."

== See also ==
- Himalayan Cataract Project, a similar charity
- Seva Canada Society, sister organization in Canada
