= Fred Hollows Reserve =

Protected area in New South Wales, Australia

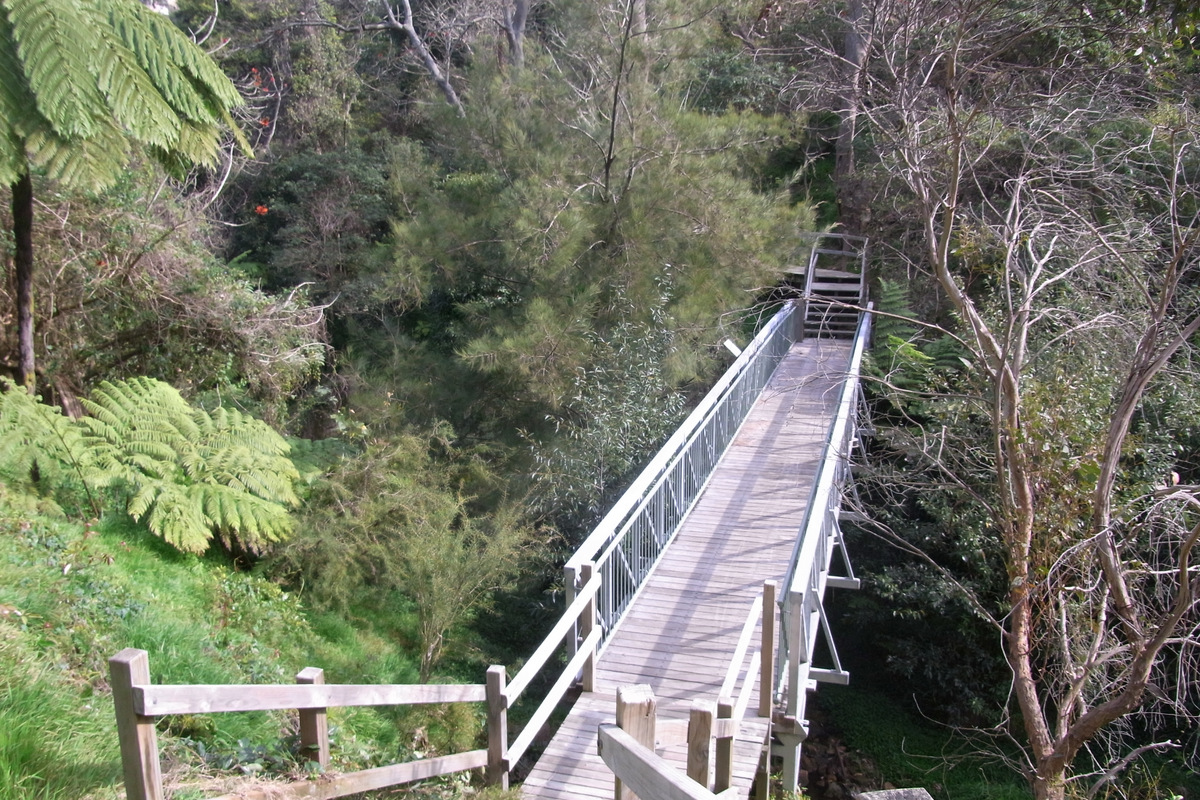
- A footbridge located in the Fred Hollows Reserve

- Location within Sydney
- Interactive map of Fred Hollows Reserve
- Type: Nature reserve
- Location: Randwick, Sydney, New South Wales, Australia
- Coordinates: 33°54′44.04″S 151°14′52.14″E
- Area: 2 ha (4.9 acres)
- Established: circa 1993
- Etymology: Fred Hollows
- Operator: Randwick City Council
- Website: randwick.nsw.gov.au

The Fred Hollows Reserve is a 2-hectare (4.9-acre) nature reserve in Randwick, the eastern suburbs of Sydney, in the state of New South Wales, Australia.

The reserve is situated in a natural area in what was formerly known as Glebe Gully and is the result of conservation efforts by the Randwick City Council, since 1993, in a hilly part of the Coogee Basin. The park follows a gully from Alison Road to Clovelly Road.

The gully faces south away from the sun, forming a closed canopy and a relatively fire-free habitat, which contrasts with the nearby urban area and busy traffic.

== History ==
The native life in the gully deteriorated in the 1970s from neglect and the deposition of urban refuse. Weeding and replanting has been neglected over the last decade and much of the native flora and fauna has disappeared.

In 1993, the reserve was named in honour of Fred Hollows, an ophthalmologist who lived in the area. Hollows is renowned for restoring the sight of thousands of people in Australia and overseas.

== Flora and fauna ==
Flora includes various ferns such as false bracken, maidenhair fern, binung and gristle fern as well as grasses and Banksias. Other noteworthy species include coachwood, lillypilly, magenta cherry, scentless rosewood, callicoma, muttonwood, five-leaved water vine, bleeding heart and the locally scarce corkwood and Sydney peppermint.

Lizards, frogs, and a wide variety of birds are known to live in the gorge. Local inhabitants include glebe gully skinks, rainbow lorikeet, welcome swallow, kookaburra, pied currawong, sulphur-crested cockatoo, and magpie.

== Access ==
Randwick Council built a boardwalk and footbridge along and across the creek, so it is now a ten-minute walk from Alison Road to Bligh Place. The entrance to the park is 150 metres west of Carrington Road, on the north side of Alison Road.

== See also ==
- Parks in Sydney
