= Napoleone Ferrara =

Italian-American molecular biologist

- Born: 26 July 1956 (age 70)
- Education: University of Catania
- Known for: VEGF discovery
- Awards: Breakthrough Prize in Life Sciences (2013); Lasker Award; Keio Medical Science Prize
- Scientific career
- Workplaces: Genentech; UC San Diego

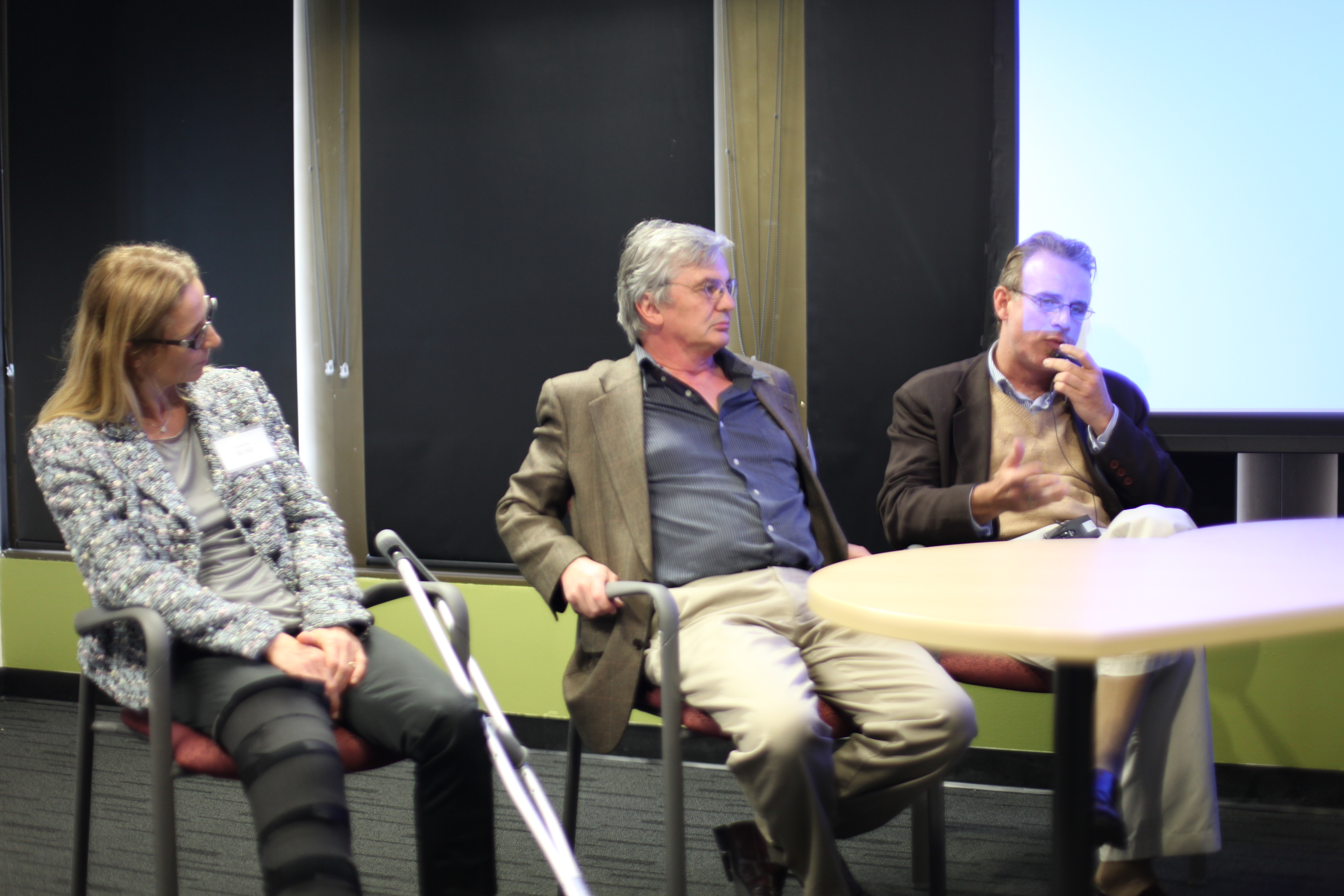
Laura Perin, Napoleone Ferrara, and Matteo Garbelotto

Napoleone Ferrara (born 26 July 1956 in Catania, Sicily, Italy) is an Italian-American molecular biologist who joined University of California, San Diego Moores Cancer Center in 2013 after a career in Northern California at the biotechnology giant Genentech, where he pioneered the development of new treatments for angiogenic diseases such as cancer, age-related macular degeneration (AMD), and diabetic retinopathy. At Genentech, he discovered VEGF—and made the first anti-VEGF antibody—which suppresses growth of a variety of tumors. These findings helped lead to development and FDA approval of the first clinically effective angiogenesis inhibitor, bevacizumab (Avastin), which prevents the growth of new blood vessels into a solid tumor. Bevacizumab, first approved for treatment of metastatic colorectal cancer in 2004, has become part of standard treatment for a variety of cancers. Ferrara's work led also to the development of ranibizumab (Lucentis), a drug that is highly effective at preventing vision loss in patients with intraocular neovascular disorders such as neovascular AMD and retinal vein occlusion. Ranibizumab and other anti-VEGF agents represent the first effective therapy for such blinding disorders and rank among the most widely used drugs in older adults.

== Education and early career ==
Ferrara received his medical degree from the University of Catania, Italy, in 1981. He did post-doctoral research at the University of California, San Francisco.

In 1988 he joined Genentech and worked there for about 25 years.

== Current research ==
Ferrara is Distinguished Professor of Pathology and Adjunct Professor of Ophthalmology at UC San Diego Health. He continues investigating mechanisms of angiogenesis aiming to develop novel treatments for cancer and ocular disorders.

== Selected honors and awards ==
Ferrara is a member of both the US National Academy of Sciences and the US National Academy of Medicine.

Ferrara has received numerous awards. In 2005, he received the Grand Prix scientifique de la Fondation Lefoulon-Delalande, a major award in Cardiovascular Research. In 2006, he was a recipient of the Passano Award and the General Motors Cancer Research Award. In 2010 he won the Lasker-deBakey Clinical Medical Research Award for the VEGF discovery and the development of the first effective therapy for neovascular AMD. In 2013, he was awarded the Breakthrough Prize in Life Sciences. In addition, he received the ASCO Science of Oncology Award (2007), the Pezcoller Foundation/AACR International Award (2009), the Dr. Paul Janssen Award for Biomedical Research (2011), and the Economist's Innovation Award for Bioscience in 2012. In September 2014, Ferrara was awarded the António Champalimaud Vision Award from the Champalimaud Foundation. In the same year, he received the Canada Gairdner International Award. In 2023, he received the Keio Medical Science Prize and the Prince Mahidol Award in Medicine.
