= Teresa Pizarro Beleza =

Portuguese legal academic

Professor Teresa Pizarro Beleza GOIH
- Born: Maria Teresa Couceiro Pizarro Beleza; 23 August 1951 (age 75); Porto, Lisbon, Portugal
- Occupations: Academic in law and criminology
- Family: Leonor Beleza (sister)

Teresa Pizarro Beleza GOIH (born 23 August 1951) was the first woman to head the Faculty of Law at NOVA University Lisbon, between 2009 and 2018. She is a feminist and an outspoken activist against discrimination against women, as well as an advocate of abortion and euthanasia.

== Family ==
Maria Teresa Couceiro Pizarro Beleza was born in Portugal's second city of Porto on 23 August 1951. She is the daughter of Maria dos Prazeres Lançarote Couceiro da Costa and José Júlio Pizarro Beleza. One sister Leonor Beleza, is a former health minister and president of the Champalimaud Foundation. Her other sister, Maria dos Prazeres Beleza, was the first woman to be nominated as vice president of Portugal's Supreme Court of Justice.

== Training ==
Beleza graduated in law from the Faculty of Law of the University of Coimbra in 1976. She obtained a master's in criminology from the University of Cambridge in England in 1982, and a PhD in legal sciences from the Faculty of Law of the University of Lisbon in 1993. Her thesis on women in law was considered exceptionally innovative. For her master's and doctoral study she obtained scholarships from the Calouste Gulbenkian Foundation and the Fundação para a Ciência e a Tecnologia (Foundation for Science and Technology).

== Career ==
Beleza was an assistant professor at the University of Lisbon from 1993 until 1998, when she joined the Faculty of Law at NOVA University Lisbon. There she created the discipline of women's law and social equality, which was included in the list of options for the law degree. She became a full professor of criminal law in 2010, having been elected as the first female dean of the law faculty in 2009. In this faculty, she also held the position of president of the pedagogical council and was also responsible for the university's contribution to the Erasmus Programme, which promotes student exchange within the European Union.

Between 1999 and 2003, Beleza represented Portugal on the European Committee for the Prevention of Torture, carrying out missions to monitor the conditions of detention of prisoners. She also represented the European Union in human rights dialogues with the People's Republic of China and the Islamic Republic of Iran. From 2002, Beleza represented her university at the European Inter-University Centre for Human Rights and Democratisation, headquartered in Lido di Venezia, Italy. This is a network of 41 European universities that specialize in teaching, training and research in the areas of human rights and democracy. From 2008 she was part of its board of administrators. In 2014, she joined several colleagues from other faculties at NOVA University to develop a PhD in globalization studies. In 2018, she became coordinator of a PhD in Gender Studies, together with the Instituto Superior de Ciências Sociais e Políticas of the University of Lisbon.

== Honours and awards ==
- 1994 – Grand-Officer of the Order of Prince Henry, Portugal (4 March 1996)
- 2021 – Prémio Maria Barroso 2020/2021.
