= Advance Australia Foundation =

Australian foundation

- Abbreviation: AAF
- Formation: 1980
- Purpose: Recognised "individuals or groups who have made outstanding contributions to the growth and enhancement of Australia, the Australian people and the Australian way of life".

The Advance Australia Foundation (AAF) was established in 1980. The AAF recognised "individuals or groups who have made outstanding contributions to the growth and enhancement of Australia, the Australian people and the Australian way of life". It was wound up in the mid-1990s.

== Award recipients ==
Awards given by the AAF included the Advance Australia Award and the Special Merit Advance Australia Award. Recipients of the Advance Australia Award included:

1991:

- Dr David Lee, for services to multiculturalism

1995:

- Peter Morton B.E.M, for services to Martial Arts & Sports.

1994:

- Murray Godfrey, for services to the community

1993:

- Patricia Barnard, for services to adult literacy
- Tracy Barrell, for services to sport
- Zanna Barron, for work with suffers of multiple sclerosis
- Phoebe Fraser, daughter of former prime minister Malcolm Fraser and representative of CARE Australia, for services to international care
- Wayne Gardner, for services to international goodwill
- Allen Henry with his dog Brutus, for services to youth
- Craig Heading, for services to science and technology
- Alan Jones, broadcaster and rugby league coach, for services to the community
- Petrea King, for services to crisis counselling
- Dulcie Magnus, for efforts with the visually impaired
- Yvonne Stewart, for work in special education

1990:

- Professor Fred Hollows, for medicine and overseas aid

1988:

- Hazel Holyman, for services to aviation

1985:

- Melvyn Bowler for services to community alcohol and drug treatment

1983:

- Australia II, for winning the America's Cup

1982:

- Lowitja O'Donoghue
- Athol Thomas for his services in promoting Western Australia

1981:

- Professor Fred Hollows, for Aboriginal eye care
- Joe Dolce, export excellence for the international success of his song Shaddap You Face.
- Norman Harwood, transportation history at the Museum of Applied Arts and Sciences
- Mary Lidbetter, local history
- Little River Band, for its contribution to the Australian music industry.

1980:

- Prue Acton, for contribution to fashion
- Charles Malpas, inventor of wine cask tap

== Government funding ==
The AAF was for several years partly funded by the Federal Government. This ended in 1986 when the AAF become involved in the Australian Made campaign, which the Government decided it would prefer to fund directly.

Since 2012, the Federal Government has funded annual Advance Awards, for innovation and achievement, to Australian citizens who live overseas or who have done so in the past.

== See also ==
- Order of Australia
