= Larry Brilliant =

American physician and businessman

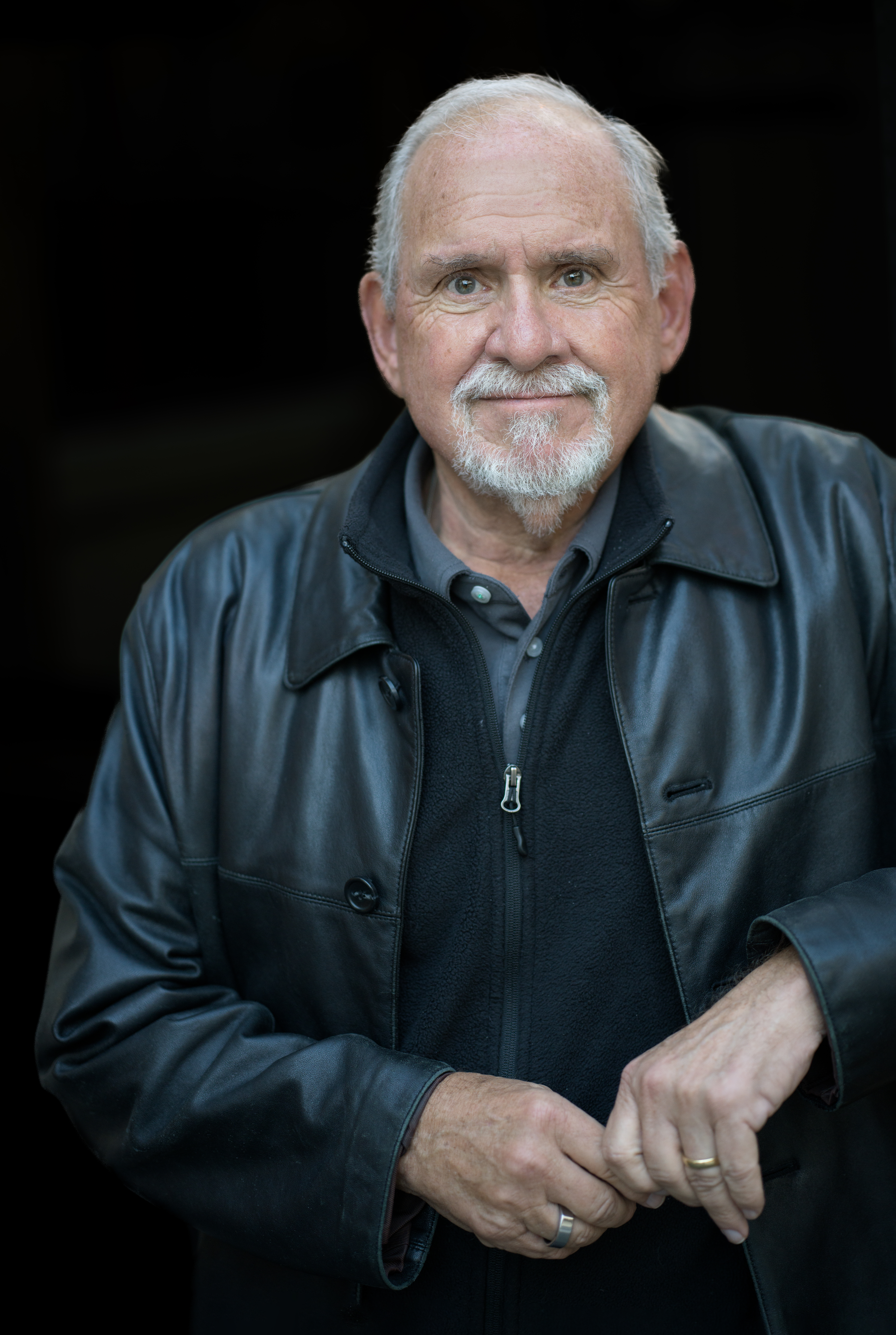
- Larry Brilliant in 2023
- Born: May 5, 1944 (age 82); Detroit, Michigan, U.S.
- Education: University of Michigan (BS, MPH); Wayne State University (MD)
- Spouse: Girija Brilliant
- Children: 3

Lawrence Brilliant (born May 5, 1944) is an American epidemiologist, technologist, philanthropist, and author, who worked with the World Health Organization from 1973–1976 helping to successfully eradicate smallpox.

Brilliant, a technology patent holder, has been the CEO of public companies and venture backed start-ups. He was the inaugural Executive Director of Google.org, the charitable arm of Google established in 2005, and the first CEO of Skoll Global Threats Fund, established in 2009 by eBay founder Jeff Skoll to address climate change, pandemics, water security, nuclear proliferation, and conflict in the Middle East. Brilliant currently serves as the Chairman of the Board of Ending Pandemics, and is also on the boards of the Skoll Foundation, Salesforce.org, The Seva Foundation, and Dharma Platform.

== Early life and education ==
Brilliant was born in Detroit, Michigan. His father, Joe Brilliant, was a philanthropist and entrepreneur. He is the grandson of Jewish immigrants from Eastern Europe, whose surname was originally Brilladentov. Brilliant received his undergraduate training as well as his MPH degree (Masters in Public Health) from the University of Michigan, where he worked on the staff of the Gargoyle Humor Magazine, and his M.D. from Wayne State University School of Medicine. He moved to California for his internship at the California Pacific Medical Center, and developed parathyroid cancer from which he recovered. Brilliant is board certified in preventive medicine and public health.

== Career ==
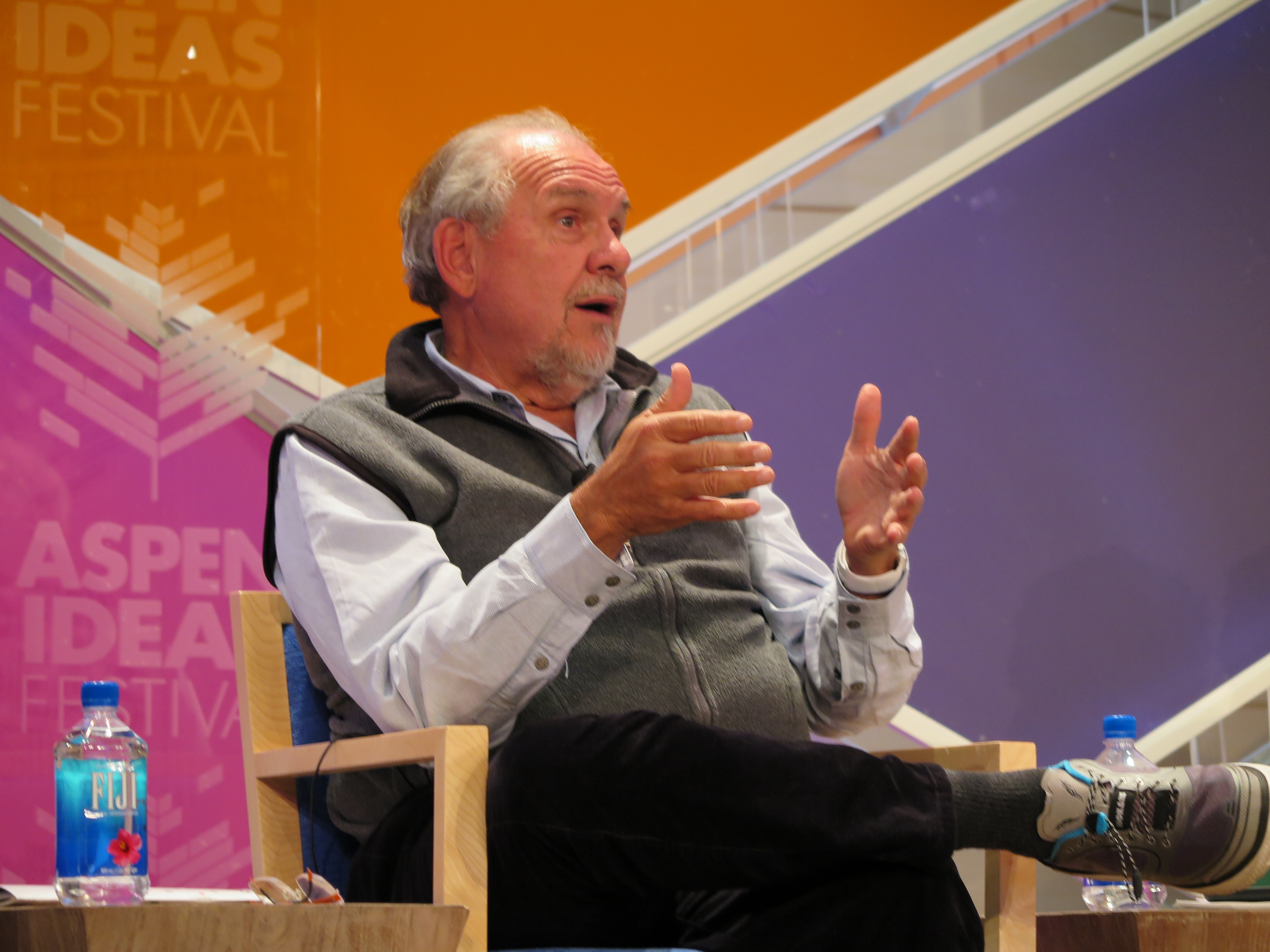
Brilliant in 2015

In 1969, a group of American Indians from many different tribes, calling themselves Indians of All Tribes, occupied the Alcatraz island in San Francisco. A call went out for doctors to help a pregnant woman there give birth and Brilliant joined their occupation as unofficial doctor. The Indians on Alcatraz named the baby "Wovoka" after a Northern Paiute medicine man. After the US government forced the Indians of All Tribes off Alcatraz, Brilliant became a media darling which led to a movie company casting him in Medicine Ball Caravan, playing a doctor in a film about a tribe of hippies who follow the Grateful Dead, Jefferson Airplane, Jethro Tull, and Joni Mitchell. The cast was paid with airline tickets to India. Brilliant and some others cashed their tickets in and rented a bus to drive around Europe, which then turned into a relief convoy to help victims of the 1970 Bhola cyclone in Bangladesh (then East Pakistan).

Civil unrest stopped the relief caravan so he spent several years in India studying at a Himalayan ashram with Neem Karoli Baba (a Hindu sage) from whom he received the name Subramanyum. After about a year, Neem Karoli Baba advised Brilliant to eradicate smallpox, a project on which he would spend the next several years. He participated, as a medical officer, in the World Health Organization (WHO) smallpox eradication program that in 1980 certified the global eradication of smallpox. Brilliant found that Indian officials became more receptive to his efforts when they learned of Neem Karoli Baba's involvement, to which he credits a significant portion of the program's success. Brilliant contributed a seven-page account of his experiences to the book Miracle of Love: Stories of Neem Karoli Baba.

In December 1978, he became a co-founder and chairman of Seva Foundation, an international, non-profit, health foundation. Seva's projects in places like China, Nepal, India, Bangladesh, Cambodia, Tanzania, Ethiopia, and Guatemala have given back sight to more than 3 million blind people through surgery, self-sufficient eye care systems, and low-cost manufacturing of intraocular lenses. One important contribution of his was his helping to set up the Aravind Eye Hospital in Madurai, India.

When he returned to the United States, he became a professor of international health at the University of Michigan and started numerous charitable and business ventures.

In 1985, he co-founded, with Stewart Brand, The Well, a prototypic online community that has been the subject of multiple books and studies. Time said, "Well was a huge hit, a precursor of every online business from Amazon.com to eBay."

He spent the first half of 2005 as a volunteer helping out in the tsunami in Sri Lanka and working in India with WHO in the campaign to eradicate polio.

On February 22, 2006, Google Inc. appointed him as the Executive Director of Google.org, the philanthropic arm of Google, a position which he held until April, 2009, when he joined the Skoll Foundation, as its President, the philanthropic organization established by former eBay president Jeff Skoll.

In July 2006, he was awarded the TED Prize, granting him $100,000 and 'One Wish to Change the World' which he presented at TED in July 2006. As his prize nominator summed up, "'Dr. Brilliant' is a name to live up to, and he has." His one wish that he presented at the conference was, "To build a powerful new early warning system to protect our world from some of its worst nightmares."

Following the H1N1 swine flu outbreak in 2010, Brilliant expressed concern that the public was not suitably concerned by the threat posed by infectious diseases. This led to Brilliant and several colleagues contributing to the creation of the film Contagion, released the following year in 2011.

In May 2013, he gave the commencement speech at Harvard School of Public Health,

Imagine that arc of history that Martin Luther King inspired is right here with us. The arc of the universe needs your help to bend it towards justice. It will not happen on its own. The arc of history will not bend towards justice without you bending it. Public health needs you to ensure health for all. Seize that history. Bend that arc. I want you to leap up, to jump up and grab that arc of history with both hands, and yank it down, twist it, and bend it. Bend it towards fairness, bend it towards better health for all, bend it towards justice!

In 2016, Brilliant published a memoir, ″Sometimes Brilliant″.

=== COVID-19 ===
In spring 2020, Brilliant commented that the World Health Organization, where he had worked for ten years, was slow to declare COVID-19 a pandemic.

Brilliant participates as an advisor to the COVID-19 Technology Task Force, a technology industry coalition founded in March 2020 collaborating on solutions to respond to and recover from the COVID-19 pandemic.

== Personal life ==
Brilliant is married to Girija (formerly Elaine) and has three children: Joe, Jon, and Iris Brilliant. Girija holds a PhD in public health administration and is an equal partner in many of her husband's enterprises. Co-founder of Seva Foundation, she was instrumental in the World Health Organization's smallpox eradication program.

Brilliant was a close friend of Steve Jobs and visited him often during the last year of his life.
