= Laura Perin =

Italian footballer (born 1997)

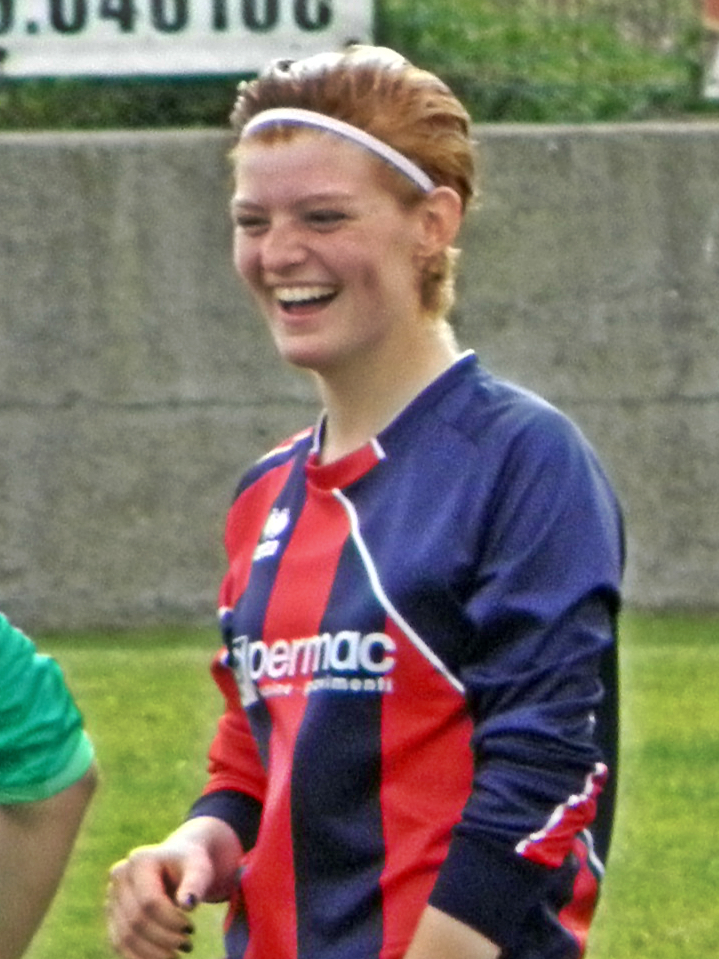

Personal information
- Date of birth: 15 July 1997 (age 29)
- Place of birth: Pordenone, Italy
- Height: 1.68 m (5 ft 6 in)
- Position: Midfielder

Team information
- Current team: Chievo Verona
- Number: 27

Senior career*
Years	Team	Apps	(Gls)
2013–2015	Pordenone		
2015–2017	Vittorio Veneto		
2017–2018	Pordenone		
2018	Tavagnacco		
2018–2021	Verona		
2021–2023	Brescia		
2023–2024	Parma		
2024–	Chievo Verona		
- * Club domestic league appearances and goals

Laura Perin (born 15 July 1997) is an Italian footballer who plays as a defender for Chievo Verona.
