= The Fred Hollows Foundation =

Non-profit organization

- Founded: 3 September 1992; Sydney, Australia
- Founder: Fred Hollows
- Type: Non-profit organization
- Purpose: Avoidable Blindness and Indigenous Australian Health
- Headquarters: Sydney, Australia
- Location: 25 countries
- Method: Medical Training, Performing Operations, Building Hospitals, Community Education, Fundraising
- Key people: Founding Director Gabi Hollows, CEO Ross Piper
- Website: www.hollows.org

The Fred Hollows Foundation is a non-profit aid organisation based in Sydney, Australia, which was founded in 1992, by eye surgeon Fred Hollows. The foundation focuses on treating and preventing blindness and other vision problems in people and communities. It operates in Australia, South East Asia, East Asia, the Middle East, and Africa.

== History ==
In 1976, Fred Hollows and teams of health workers set out on the National Trachoma and Eye Health Program with the aim to eliminate trachoma and other eye conditions in rural and remote communities, and also to record the status of eye health in rural Australia. As a result of this program, the number of Indigenous Australians suffering from blindness was halved.

The Fred Hollows Foundation was founded on 3 September 1992 by Fred Hollows, shortly before he died. Hollows was an ophthalmologist and a social justice activist. Following Fred's passing, his widow, Gabi Hollows, ensured that his work in Vietnam and many other countries continued through the foundation.

== Programs ==
The foundation trains eye care providers. The foundation also supports the prevention and treatment of eye disease by screening for diseases that cause avoidable blindness, performing surgery, providing spectacles, addressing lifestyle factors that contribute to disease, and conducting other sight saving interventions. The foundation provides technology and resources needed to upgrade and construct eye health clinics.

=== Africa ===
In Africa, the foundation focuses on comprehensive eye health systems with an emphasis on the training of medical staff, screening for poor vision and eye disease, subsidised treatment and provision of equipment and infrastructure in countries such as: Eritrea, Kenya, Rwanda, Ethiopia, and Burundi.

=== South Asia, East Asia and Middle East ===
The foundation works throughout South Asia, East Asia and the Middle East in countries such as: Afghanistan, Myanmar, Pakistan, Bangladesh, Nepal, Palestine, Cambodia, China, Indonesia, Timor Leste, Philippines, Lao PDR, and Vietnam. In each of these countries, the Fred Hollows Foundation strives to build comprehensive eye care systems.

=== Indigenous Australia ===
The foundation works with partners to advocate to governments for sustained investments in services to improve eye health and also to close the health inequality gap between Aboriginal and Torres Strait Australians with the rest of the Australian population.

In February 2008, the foundation committed up to A$3 million to build an eye clinic in Alice Springs, Australia. By April 2010, this clinic had not been built, with criticism that the Australian Government were relying on a charity to build the clinic. The Minister for Indigenous Health, Warren Snowdon, said the foundation was best placed to provide the eye clinic service.

== Accreditation ==
The foundation is a member of the Australian Council for International Development (ACFID), and is also a signatory to the ACFID code of conduct that "defines standards of governance, management, financial control and reporting with which non government development organisations (NGDOs) should comply."

Australia's overseas aid agency, AusAID, has accredited the foundation, and as such the foundation is eligible to receive funding from the Australian Government for overseas aid programs.

== Awards and recognition ==
The foundation has been named one of Australia's Top 5 Reputable Charities. The foundation was named 2013 Australian Charity of the Year and was recognised by The Global Journal as one of the world's top 50 NGOs.

- 2005 – Winner of the National Award for Excellence in Community Business Partnerships in recognition of the successful partnership between the foundation, Woolworths and the Wugularr community for the Community Stores Program.
- 2009 – Winner of the Gold Star award for non-profit video at the International Fundraising Congress in The Netherlands.
- 2013 – Winner of the National Charity Award in the inaugural Australian Charity Awards – a new partner program of the Australian Business Awards
- 2013 – Ranked within the top fifty best non-government organisations (NGOs) in the world in an annual list of the top 100 NGOs published by the Global Journal

== Controversy ==
In late 2009, it was claimed that in the previous year the foundation lost more than $2 million with the investment bank Goldman Sachs JBWere. A former member of the organisation's British board, Nick Crane, said the losses were evidence of a new entrepreneurial zeal in the Australian head office, and that the foundation was at risk of losing sight of its true purpose because newer members of the Australian management team had backgrounds in business rather than charity. The foundation denied these claims, and responded that the $2 million loss was incorrect and that the foundation had lost $270,000 from investments but had actually gained $350,000 income. However, the value of the foundation's investments had been written down by $1.6 million by the end of 2008. The earlier article claims the financial report was not published. After a letter from Gabi Hollows to the editor of the Sydney Morning Herald, the article was corrected.

== See also ==
- Fred Hollows
- Gabi Hollows
- Orbis International
- Sightsavers
- Eyes for Africa
