= Leonor Beleza =

Portuguese lawyer and politician (born 1948)

Leonor Beleza GCC GCIH
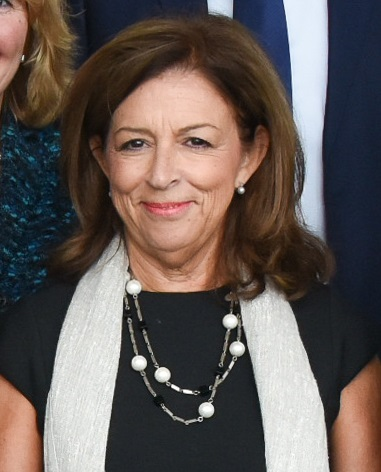
- Leonor Beleza in 2017

Member of the Council of State
- Incumbent
- Assumed office 25 June 2008
- President: Aníbal Cavaco Silva; Marcelo Rebelo de Sousa; António José Seguro
- Preceded by: Manuela Ferreira Leite

Minister of Health
- In office 6 November 1985 – 5 January 1990
- Prime Minister: Aníbal Cavaco Silva
- Preceded by: António Maldonado Gonelha
- Succeeded by: Arlindo de Carvalho

Secretary of State for Social Security
- In office 18 June 1983 – 6 November 1985
- Prime Minister: Mário Soares
- Preceded by: António Bagão Félix
- Succeeded by: José Pinto Sancho

Secretary of State for the Presidency of the Council of Ministers
- In office 12 June 1982 – 9 June 1983
- Prime Minister: Francisco Pinto Balsemão
- Preceded by: Marcelo Rebelo de Sousa
- Succeeded by: Alfredo Barroso

Member of the Assembly of the Republic
- In office 5 April 2002 – 9 March 2005
- Constituency: Portalegre
- In office 13 August 1987 – 26 October 1995
- Constituency: Porto (1987–1991); Lisbon (1991–1995)
- In office 31 May 1983 – 3 November 1985
- Constituency: Lisbon

President of the Champalimaud Foundation
- Incumbent
- Assumed office 17 December 2004
- Preceded by: Position established

Personal details
- Born: Maria Leonor Couceiro Pizarro Beleza; 23 November 1948 (age 77) Porto, Portugal
- Party: Social Democratic Party (since 1974)
- Other political affiliations: SEDES (since 1970)
- Spouse: Diogo de Mendonça Tavares
- Children: 2
- Relatives: Teresa Pizarro Beleza (sister); Miguel Beleza (brother); Maria dos Prazeres Beleza (sister)
- Education: University of Lisbon
- Occupation: Lawyer • Politician

Maria Leonor Couceiro Pizarro Beleza de Mendonça Tavares GCC GCIH (born 23 November 1948) is a Portuguese lawyer and politician.

== Career ==
She is daughter of José Júlio Pizarro Beleza and Maria dos Prazeres Lançarote Couceiro da Costa. Her brother is former Minister of Finance Miguel Beleza and her sisters are Maria dos Prazeres Beleza, a former judge in the Portuguese Supreme Court, and Teresa Pizarro Beleza, the first woman to head the Faculty of Law at NOVA University Lisbon.

Member of the Social Democratic Party, she served twice as Minister of Health in the Portuguese government. She is the 1st President of the Champalimaud Foundation.

Leonor Beleza is a graduate of the University of Lisbon Law School, where she has also worked as an assistant professor. During a distinguished professional career she has held a number of high-profile public offices. Among other positions, she was Secretary of State of the Presidency of the Cabinet (1982–1983), Secretary of State for Social Security (1983–1985), and Minister of Health (1985–1990) in the Portuguese Government. She has been elected as a Member of Parliament on several occasions and on two occasions she has served as Vice President of the Assembly of the Republic (1991–1994, 2002–2005). In addition to her prominent role in public affairs Mrs Beleza has also played an active role in the private sector.

Leonor Beleza is currently the Chairman of the Portuguese League for People with Physical Disabilities, chairman of the advisory board of the D. Pedro IV Foundation, and a member of the General Councils of the CEBI Foundation and of the Gil Foundation. She is also a vigorous campaigner for women's rights, a cause she has supported for many years. In 2004, Leonor Beleza was appointed Chairman of the Champalimaud Foundation by the will of António Champalimaud. Leonor Beleza headed the Banco Totta & Açores Supervisory Board (1995–1998) and member of the BCP's (Banco Comercial Português) General Council and Supervisory Board (2011–2013).

== Marriage and issue ==
She married Diogo de Mendonça Rodrigues Tavares and had two children:

- Mariana da Conceição Beleza de Mendonça Tavares (born Lisbon, 4 December 1975); by Bernardo Maria Correia Mendes Pinheiro Torres (born Lisbon, 29 February 1976) she had one daughter Maria Beatriz Beleza Tavares Pinheiro Torres (born Lisbon, 13 October 1999)
- Miguel Couceiro Beleza de Mendonça Tavares (born 8 March 1979)

== AIDS scandal ==
In 2001, a Portuguese court indicted Beleza propagating a contagious disease during her time as Health Minister during the 1980s. More than 100 Portuguese haemophiliacs had become infected with the AIDS virus after receiving transfusions of contaminated plasma that had been imported and distributed by the public health service, part of the larger worldwide contaminated haemophilia blood products scandal.

== Honours ==
=== Portuguese National Honours ===
- Grand-Cross of the Order of Christ, Portugal (9 June 2005)
- Grand-Cross of the Order of Prince Henry, Portugal (5 September 2017)

=== Foreign Honours ===
- Grand-Cross of the Order of the Falcon, Iceland (25 February 1994)
