= Govindappa Venkataswamy =

Indian ophthalmologist

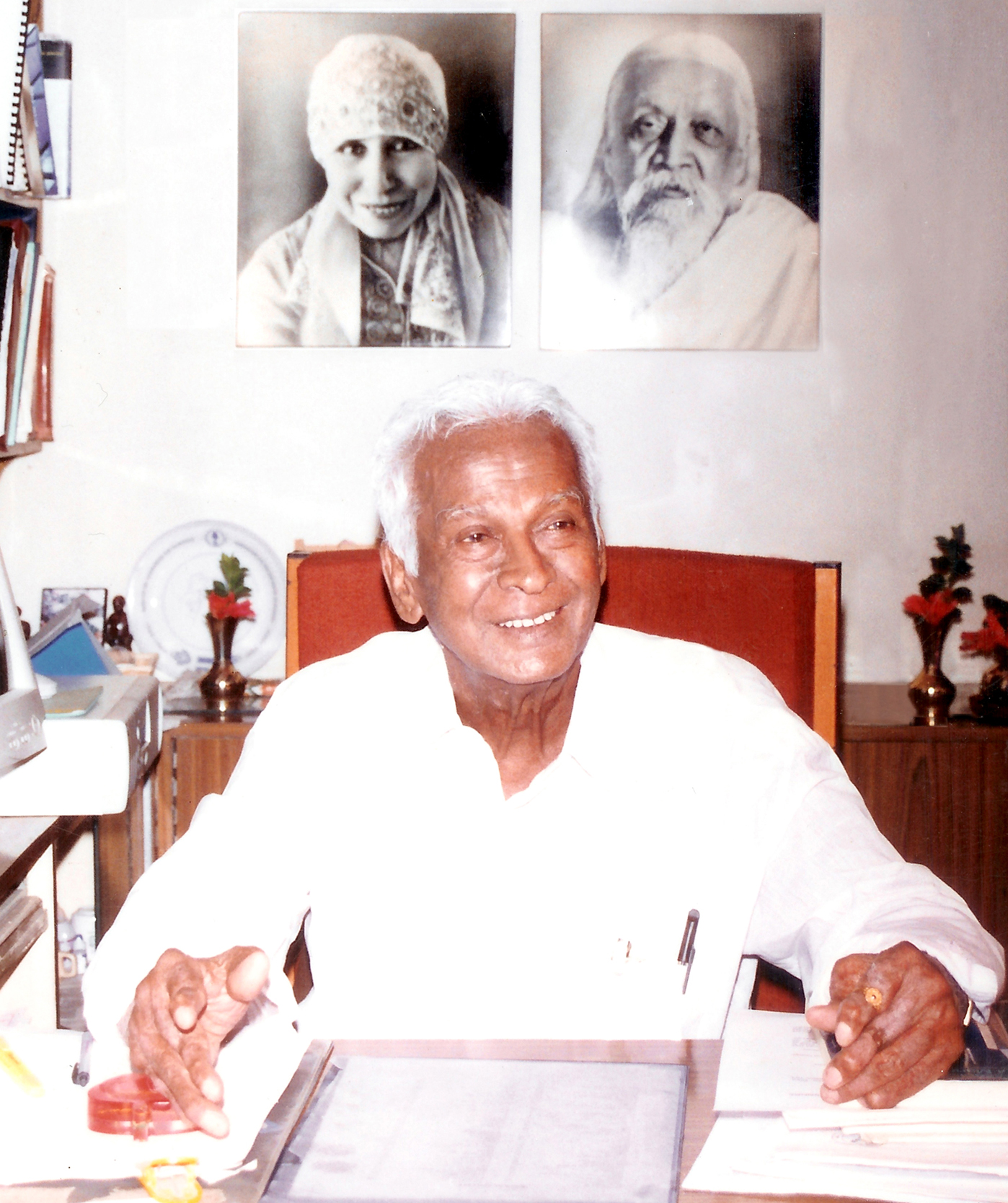
- Born: Govindappa Venkataswamy; 1 October 1918; Ayan Vadamalapuram, Vilathikulam, Thoothukudi District, Madras Presidency, British India (now in Tamil Nadu, India)
- Died: 7 July 2006 (aged 87); Madurai, Tamil Nadu, India
- Other name: Dr V
- Education: Stanley Medical College
- Occupation: Ophthalmologist

Govindappa Venkataswamy (1 October 1918 – 7 July 2006), popularly known as Dr V., was an Indian ophthalmologist who dedicated his life to eliminating needless blindness. He was the founder and former chairman of Aravind Eye Hospitals. He is best known for developing a high quality, high volume, low-cost service delivery model that has restored sight to millions of people. Since inception, Aravind Eye Care System (a registered non-profit organisation) has seen over 55 million patients, and performed over 6.8 million surgeries. Over 50% of the organisation's patients pay either nothing or highly subsidised rates. Its scale and self-sustainability prompted a 1993 Harvard Business Case Study on the Aravind model.

Venkataswamy was permanently crippled by rheumatoid arthritis at age 30. He trained as an ophthalmologist, and personally performed over 100,000 eye surgeries. As a government servant he helped develop and pioneer the concept of eye camps and received a Padma Shri from the Government of India in 1973.

In 1992, Venkataswamy and partners of Aravind founded Aurolab, an internationally certified manufacturing facility that brought the price of the intraocular lens down to one-tenth of international prices, making it affordable for developing countries. Today, Aurolab manufactures ophthalmic pharmaceuticals, instruments and equipment, in addition to intraocular lenses, and exports to 160 countries worldwide. In 1996, under Venkataswamy's leadership, the Lions Aravind Institute for Community Ophthalmology (LAICO) was founded. LAICO is a training and consulting institute that has helped replicate the Aravind model in 347 hospitals across India and 30 other developing countries.

== Early life and career ==
Born in 1918 in Vadamalapuram, a backward farming village in Thoothukudi District, Venkataswamy was the eldest of five children in a Telugu-speaking Kamma family. He walked two kilometres to school each day and his early lessons were written in sand from the riverbed. There were no doctors in his village, and by the age of 10 he had lost three cousins due to pregnancy-related complications. The untimely deaths spurred his decision to become a doctor. As a young man, he followed the teachings of Mahatma Gandhi, Swami Vivekananda and Sri Aurobindo.

Venkataswamy earned a Bachelor of Science in chemistry in 1938 from American College, Madurai. In 1944 he received his medical degree from Stanley Medical College in Madras, graduating second in his class. In 1951 he qualified with an MS in Ophthalmology at Government Ophthalmic Hospital, Madras. He was in medical college when his father died, leaving him the head of the family. After receiving his medical degree, Venkataswamy served as a physician with the Indian Army from 1945 to 1948. He was discharged after contracting a rare form of rheumatoid arthritis. He was 30-years-old at the time. The condition permanently twisted his fingers out of shape, and left him bed-ridden for two years. Upon his return to medicine his condition barred him from training in obstetrics, his chosen field. He decided to train instead in ophthalmology.

In 1956, he was appointed head of the Department of Ophthalmology at the Madurai Medical College and eye surgeon at the Government Erskine Hospital in Madurai. He held these posts for 20 years. In 1965, at a conference on rehabilitation for the blind, Venkataswamy met Sir John Wilson, founder of the Royal Commonwealth Society for the Blind (later known as Sightsavers International). The latter had been blinded in childhood by an accident in his school chemistry lab. The two established a lifelong friendship. Venkataswamy. credits Sir John Wilson's mentorship for helping him develop a global view on blindness prevention. The two men met with then Prime Minister, Indira Gandhi, to help launch India's National Program for the Control of Blindness. Venkataswamy then led Tamil Nadu's initiative to establish mobile eye camps that took sight-restoring services into rural India. He established a rehabilitation centre for the blind in 1966, and an Ophthalmic Assistants Training program in 1973. In his clinical work, Venkataswamy personally performed over one hundred thousand successful eye surgeries. With Wilson's support, Venkataswamy also started India's first residential nutrition rehabilitation centre in Madurai where children with potentially blinding Vitamin A deficiency received treatment, while their mothers were given training in how to grow and prepare nutritional meals.

== Study of Aravind Model ==
Venkataswamy pioneered mobile eye camps with the government, and later implemented this practice at Aravind. Teams of doctors and nurses from Aravind regularly visit rural villages where they conduct 'eye camps' that screen patients for vision impairments. Those requiring glasses receive them on site. Patients requiring surgery are brought back to an Aravind hospital, where they receive surgery, room and board, return transport and a follow-up visit at no charge. Each year Aravind hosts over 2,500 camps, averaging 40 camps every week with 500 community partners.

Venkataswamy introduced a tiered pricing system at Aravind. There are no income assessments or eligibility criteria for free or subsidised treatment. Patients decide whether they would like to access free, subsidised or paid services. Within this system, a cataract operation ranges from free to a little under US$900 (~ Rs. 53,700) based on the accommodations associated with the surgery and the type of lens implanted. Patients can self-select services and room type based on preference and ability to pay, without compromising clinical outcomes. In practice, one patient who pays, subsidises the no-frills surgeries and pre- and post-operative care of two non-paying patients.

Nurses, known within the Aravind system as Mid-Level Ophthalmic Personnel (MLOP), are trained extensively in discrete skills, and specialise in different areas of the hospital work flow, including administrative work, diagnostics, nursing and counseling. The MLOPs are primarily women who are high-school graduates recruited from surrounding villages. In the operating room each surgeon, is assisted by four MLOPs. With stream-lined processes, Aravind averages 2,000 surgeries per doctor per year compared to a national average of 400. Tina Rosenberg for The New York Times writes, "Aravind can practice compassion successfully because it is run like a McDonald’s with assembly-line efficiency, strict quality norms, brand recognition, standardization, consistency, ruthless cost control and above all, volume. Each year, Aravind does 60 percent as many eye surgeries as the United Kingdom’s National Health System, at one one-thousandth of the cost."

Since 1993 Harvard Business School has distributed more than 150,000 copies of 'In Service for Sight' (their original case study on the Aravind model) to the top twenty business schools in the United States.

== Founding of Aravind ==
In 1976, at the mandatory retirement age of 58, Venkataswamy founded the Aravind Eye Hospital in Madurai, Tamil Nadu with his four siblings, G. Nallakrishnan, R. Janaky, G. Srinivasan, G. Natchiar and their respective spouses, Meenakshi, R.S. Ramasamy, Lalitha S. and P. Namperumalsamy. Together, they formed the Govel Trust to manage the hospital, and defined Aravind's mission: To eliminate needless blindness by providing high quality and compassionate eye care affordable for all. P. Namperumalsamy's sister, P. Vijayalakshmi and her husband, M. Srinivasan also joined his work. In the initial years he and his team faced many financial difficulties. Venkataswamy is the founding member of Seva Foundation (a US-based non-profit organisation), that partnered with Aravind in the early years by widening the organisation's access to the latest technology, and skilled volunteers. Seva continues to collaborate with Aravind in various aspects of eye care management, education, and research. Today, the Aravind Eye Care System encompasses a growing network of eye care facilities which include seven tertiary centres, six secondary hospitals, six outpatient eye examination centres and seventy primary eye examination facilities, as well as a post-graduate training institute for ophthalmology, an international eye research centre, eye bank, training and consulting institute and manufacturing facility.

== Personal life ==
Venkataswamy never married. He lived with his younger brother G. Srinivasan (Aravind Eye Care System's Director of Finance and Building) and his family. Today, over 35 members across three generations of Venkataswamy's family work at Aravind. Venkataswamy was a Gandhian and a disciple of the spiritual teachers Sri Aurobindo and the Mother. Former President of India A.P.J. Abdul Kalam, a friend of his, wrote, "In the Aravind experience I see the path we need to take, a transformation of life into a powerful instrument of right action." he used to walk daily 6 km to school

== Books, films and other media ==
Books

- Illuminated Spirit by Govindappa Venkataswamy
- Infinite Vision: How Aravind Became the World's Greatest Business Case for Compassion
- Namaste, Dr. V! He restored eyesight for the most marginalised

Films

- Infinite Vision
- Healing the Eyes of the World
- PBS Religion and News Weekly

Interviews

- Spiritual Consciousness and Healing

Media articles

- The Perfect Vision of Dr Venkataswamy (Fast Company, 2001)
- Man of Vision (Business Today, 2004)
- McDonalds and Dr Venkataswamy (Forbes, 2010)
- A Hospital Network with a Vision (New York Times, 2013)
- McSurgery: A Man Who Saved 2.4 Million Eyes (Wall Street Journal)

== Degrees earned ==
- Bachelor of Arts in chemistry from American College in Madurai in 1938
- Doctor of Medicine from Stanley Medical College in Madras in 1944
- Doctor of ophthalmology at the Government Ophthalmic Hospital in Madras in 1951
- Honorary Doctorate from University of Illinois, 1985
- Honorary Fellowship awarded by The Royal College of Ophthalmology, London, 1994

== Awards and honours ==
- Padma Shri in 1973
- Lifetime Service Award from the International Agency for the Prevention of Blindness, 1982
- Helen Keller International Award, 1987
- Harold Wit Lectureship, Harvard Divinity School, 1991
- Pisart-Lighthouse for the Blind Award, 1992
- International Blindness Prevention Award, American Academy of Ophthalmology, 1993
- Susruta Award, Asia Pacific Academy of Ophthalmology, 1997
- Dr B. C. Roy Award – 2001
- ASCRS Ophthalmology Hall of Fame, 2004
- On 1 October 2018, search engine Google commemorated Dr Venkataswamy with a Doodle on his birth centenary.
