= Personal sound amplification product =

Personal Sound Amplification Products, also known as "Personal Sound Amplification Devices," or by the acronym PSAP, are defined by the U.S. Food and Drug Administration as wearable electronic products that are intended to amplify sounds for people who are not Deaf or Hard of Hearing. They are not hearing aids, which the FDA describes as intended to compensate for hearing loss. According to Dr. Mann of the FDA, choosing a PSAP as a substitute for a hearing aid can lead to more damage to your hearing.

== Differences ==
Both PSAPs and hearing aids are small electronic devices that fit into the ear and amplify sound. PSAPs are mostly off-the-shelf amplifiers for people with normal hearing who need a little boost in volume in certain settings (such as hunting and bird watching). Hearing aids contain a much higher level of technology prescribed to treat a diagnosed hearing loss. PSAPs are not regulated under the Food, Drug and Cosmetic Act because they are not intended to treat, diagnose or cure hearing impairment and do not alter the structure or function of the body. As a result, there is no regulatory classification, product code or definition for these products. However, the FDA does regulate PSAPs under certain provisions of the Radiation Control for Health and Safety Act of 1968, covering electronic products such as sound amplification equipment that emits sonic vibrations.

== PSAPs ==
Because they do not require a medical prescription and professional fitting, PSAPs have been described as the audio version of reading glasses. As such, PSAPs are suggested for use by hunters listening for prey, for bird watching, assistance hearing distant conversations or performances and amplifying the sound of a television in a quiet room, for example. Of note, even reading glasses are regulated under the FDA.

Various models of PSAPs from a variety of manufacturers vary in price, performance, weight, user experience and the software algorithms to enhance and tailor hearing. While some models simply amplify sound, others are more sophisticated designs, providing directional microphones and customizable equalization of the audio signal to clear up ambient or extraneous noise.

PSAPs have grown in popularity among people with hearing impairment, in part because they are less expensive than custom hearing aids, although apathy, vanity and difficulty scheduling appointments with audiologists also have been cited as reasons for low hearing aid adoption. Because they do not require medical examination and fitting, PSAPs range from as little as 50 to several hundred dollars in price, while custom hearing aids cost about $1400 on average and are not covered by Medicare and many insurance plans.

According to the National Institute of Deafness and Other Communication Diseases, of the 36 million Americans who might benefit from a hearing aid, only about 20 percent actually use one. However, a 2010 survey indicates that fewer than 18 percent of PSAPs were used as a substitute for custom hearing aids and concludes that the majority of PSAP users would have lived with their hearing loss because of the higher price of hearing aids.

Many PSAPs are sold direct to the consumer through online stores, at pharmacies and through many drugstore and retail store chains.

== PSAP Amplifiers ==
PSAP amplifiers are usually small simple devices. They amplify sounds and deliver the result to the ear(s) of the user. The main components are a microphone, amplifier, speaker, volume controller and power source.

The microphone captures the sound (pressure) waves and converts them to an electric signal. The amplifier (an electronic circuit) increases the amplitude of the electric signal using a power source (battery). The speaker converts the amplified electric signal back into a sound wave. The volume (gain) control is used to adjust the amount of amplification applied to the electric signal and thus, indirectly, controls the sound volume.

The devices vary in size from small boxes (with an earpiece attached) worn around the neck or hung off of a belt - down to - a tiny encapsulated device that fits inside the ear canal. These smaller devices look like hearing aids but are far simpler and do not correct hearing loss.
