= Tilganga Institute of Ophthalmology =

Geography
- Location: Gaushala, Bagmati Bridge; Kathmandu, Nepal
- Coordinates: 27°42′19″N 85°21′03″E

History
- Founded: 1994

Links
- Website: www.tilganga.org
- Other links: www.iapb.org

Tilganga Institute of Ophthalmology, formerly called the Tilganga Eye Centre, in Nepal is the implementing body of the Nepal Eye Program, a non-profit, community based, non-government organization launched in 1992. It was founded in part by ophthalmologist and cataract surgeon Sanduk Ruit. The current facility was opened in 1994. The World Health Organization recognized Tilganga Institute of Ophthalmology as a WHO Collaboration Centre of Ophthalmology in 2019. In Nepal, it is the second institute, and first institute in the field of ophthalmology to receive this designation. It provides various speciality services of Ophthalmology.

The Tilganga Eye Hospital initiative aims to transition into a specialized university through a dedicated legislative bill registered in the Parliament of Nepal to expand higher education, specialized eye care, and medical technology research. Currently, academic programs and eye care services are operated via the Tilganga Institute of Ophthalmology (TIO) located in Gaushala, Kathmandu.

== Facilities ==
According to the centre, provided facilities include:

- A clinical facility for eye care.
- An education & training department which runs Fellowship program, MD Residency Program in Ophthalmology, Master of Optometry, Bachelor in Optometry and Vision Science, Certificate in Ophthalmic Science and short term trainings.
- An outreach unit which runs 2 community eye hospital, 18 rural community eye centres and high-volume outreach microsurgical eye clinics for the rural community throughout Nepal and committed similar efforts regularly in China, Bangladesh, Bhutan, India, Cambodia and North Korea.
- An eye bank which undertakes cornea harvesting activity to provide corneas for corneal transplant operations and awareness programs for overcoming resistance to eye donation.
- A manufacturing facility which specializes in the production of intraocular lenses (IOLs).
- A research unit which focuses on improving clinical as well as operational activities.
