= Aravind Eye Hospitals =

Network of eye hospitals in India

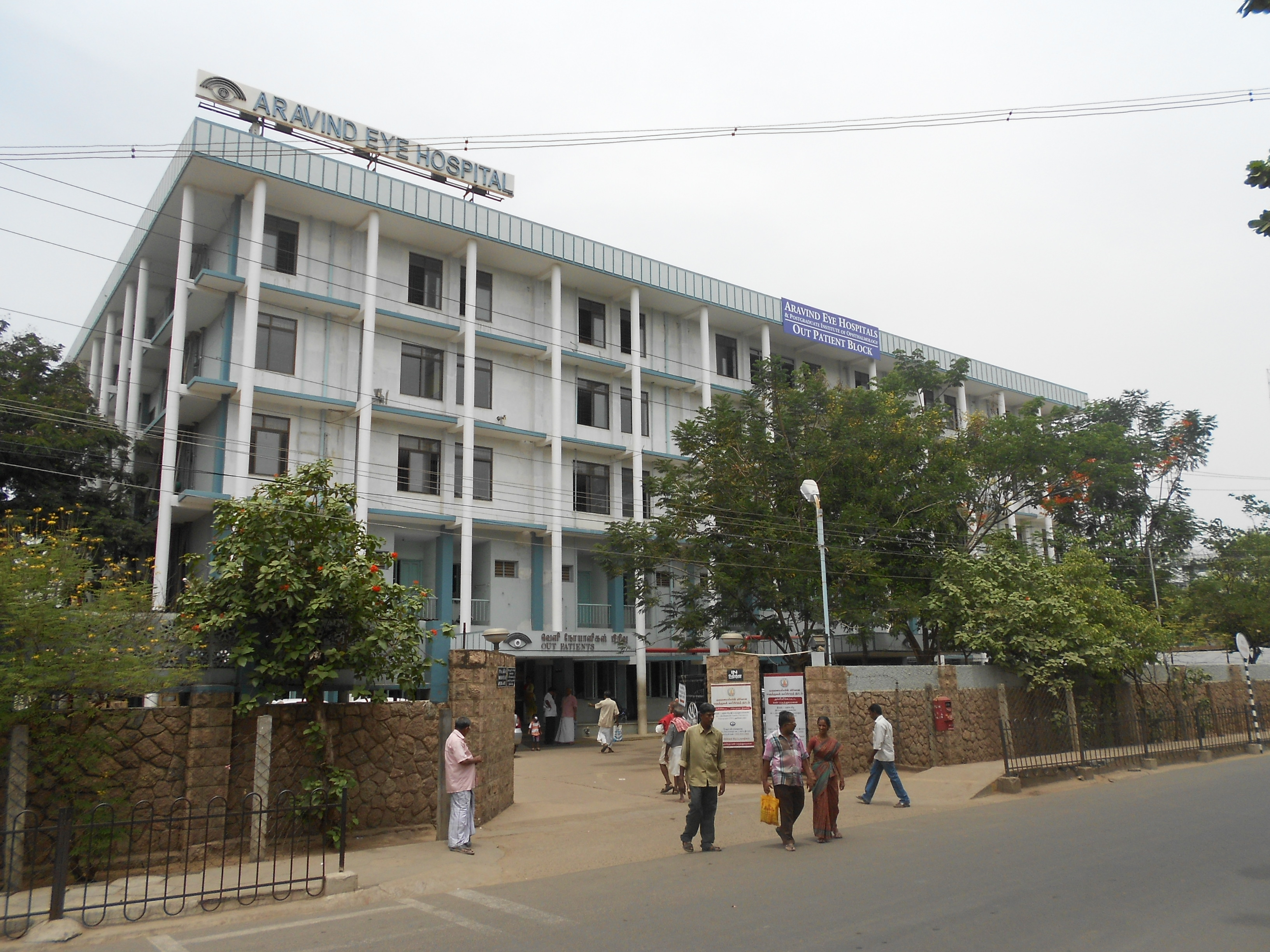
- Aravind Eye Hospital, Madurai

Geography
- Location: Tamil Nadu, India, Tamil Nadu, India

Organisation
- Type: Specialist
- Network: Aravind Eye Care System

Services
- Beds: 4000
- Speciality: Ophthalmology

History
- Founded: 1976; 50 years ago

Links
- Website: www.aravind.org
- Lists: Hospitals in India

Aravind Eye Hospitals is a hospital chain in India. It was founded by Dr. Govindappa Venkataswamy at Madurai, Tamil Nadu in 1976. It has grown into a network of eye hospitals and has had a major impact in eradicating cataract related blindness in India. As of 2012, Aravind has treated nearly 32 million patients and performed 4 million surgeries. The model of Aravind Eye Care hospitals has been applauded and has become a subject for numerous case studies across the world.

== History ==
Cataracts are a major source of blindness in India, with at least 4 million cases reported every year, contributing to nearly to a quarter of the world's blind. Cataract related blindness can be avoided by timely intervention and surgery.

== The Aravind Model ==
Dr. Venkataswamy's vision was to eradicate needless blindness in India. Dr Venkataswamy wanted to emulate the service efficiency of McDonald's fast food and sought to adapt it to the eye care system to cope with increasing the number of patients treated. Aravind began performing surgeries on a large scale with treatment being free or heavily subsidized for the poor cross subsidized by the paying patients. Aravind established an outreach program wherein doctors reach out to remote villages to conduct eye camps, some times, in association with various organizations. The organizations take care of the costs of the camp, transporting the patients to surgery and their rehabilitation while Aravind does the surgery free of cost. Aravind started performing 5 times the number of cataract surgeries that were performed in the entire country and 16 times more than that of the entire U.S.

Aravind focused on rotating doctors between free and paid wards, concentrating on efficiency and hygiene, thus eliminating differences between the surgeries done for paid and non-paid patients. The rate of infection in Aravind was about four per ten thousand surgeries, which was significantly lower than the international norm of six per ten thousand surgeries.

== Hospitals and facilities ==
Aravind Hospital started in 1976 as an 11-bed hospital in Madurai. Aravind opened a hospital in Theni in 1985 and Tirunelveli in 1988. The hospital at Coimbatore was founded in 1997. Aravind later expanded to five more cities in Tamil Nadu including Tirupur, Salem, Dindigul, Thoothukudi, Udumalaipettai and neighboring Pondicherry. To commemorate Dr V's birth centenary, Arvind-Chennai, the largest among all Aravind Eye Hospitals, was established in September 2017. In 2019, with the support of TTD, who allocated the land at a nominal lease, Sri Venkateswara Aravind Eye Hospital, Tirupati branch was established in March 2019 to provide access to 14 million population of Chittoor, Nellore, Kadapa, Anantapur and neighbouring districts.

The group also has four partnership projects — with the Rajiv Gandhi Charitable Trust in Amethi, another in Lucknow, Birla Corporation in Kolkata and Shanghvi Trust in Amreli, Gujarat. Aravind also set up its first overseas venture in Nigeria in 2018 in partnership with Chanrai Group, which is probably the largest eye-care facility in Africa with a capacity to perform 10,000 surgeries annually.

=== LAICO ===
Aravind established Lions Aravind Institute of Community Ophthalmology (LAICO) in association with Lions International in 1992. The institute offers training for hospital administrators, hospital operations managers and other management professionals.

=== Aurolab ===
The lens (IOL) implanted during cataract surgery improves visual outcomes and, thereby, quality of life. However, the high cost threatened Aravind's ability to provide IOLs to its poorer patients in the late 1980s. This led to Aravind establishing Aurolab, a manufacturing facility, which introduced IOLs at $10 while others were selling them at $60-$100. Aurolab now manufactures a little more than two million lenses annually and exports to 160 countries. About 60% of Aurolab's sales go to non-profit organisations. Aurolab now produces high-quality IOLs, sutures, blades, pharmaceuticals, and equipment at a fraction of their cost in the West, enabling Aravind and other providers to maintain quality and equity in care. Aurolab now meets over 10% of the needs of developing countries.

=== Aravind Eyebank ===
Aravind has established four eye banks viz. Rotary Aravind International Eye Bank in Madurai in association with Rotary International (1998), Aravind – IOB Eye bank in Coimbatore in association with Indian Overseas Bank (1998), Rotary Aravind Eye Bank in Tirunelveli in association with Rotary International (2004) and Aravind Eye Bank Association in Puducherry (2005).

== Awards and recognition ==
- Gates Award for Global Health (2008)
- Conrad N. Hilton Humanitarian Prize (2010)
