= Edwin Grant Conklin Medal =

Developmental biology award

The Edwin Grant Conklin Medal was inaugurated in 1995 by the Society for Developmental Biology in honor of the biologist Edwin Conklin. It is awarded annually to recognise a member of the society who has carried out distinguished and sustained research in developmental biology. The recipient delivers a feature lecture at the annual society meeting and is presented with a commemorative plaque.

== List of recipients ==
The following have won the award:

- 1995 – John Phillip Trinkaus (Yale University)
- 1996 – John W. Saunders Jr. (State University of New York at Albany)
- 1997 – Elizabeth D. Hay (Harvard Medical School)
- 1998 – Thomas C. Kaufman (Indiana University)
- 1999 – Clement Markert (Yale University)
- 2000 – Charles B. Kimmel (University of Oregon)
- 2001 – John B. Gurdon (University of Cambridge)
- 2002 – Gail R. Martin (University of California, San Francisco)
- 2003 – Allan C. Spradling (Carnegie Institution of Washington, Baltimore, Maryland)
- 2004 – Matthew Scott (Stanford University)
- 2005 – Nicole Marthe Le Douarin (Honoraire at the Collège de France and Secrétaire Perpétuelle of the Académie des Sciences de l'Institut de France)
- 2006 – Trudi Schupbach (Princeton University)
- 2007 – Janet Rossant (Hospital for Sick Children, Toronto, Canada)
- 2008 – Elizabeth J. Robertson (University of Oxford, United Kingdom)
- 2009 – David Mark Kingsley (Stanford University)
- 2010 – Noriyuki Satoh (Okinawa Institute of Science & Technology, Japan)
- 2011 – Ruth Lehmann (Skirball Institute of Biomolecular Medicine, NYU School of Medicine, Howard Hughes Medical Institute)
- 2012 – Clifford Tabin (Department of Genetics, Harvard Medical School, Boston, Massachusetts)
- 2013 – Marianne Bronner (California Institute of Technology)
- 2014 – Richard Harland (University of California, Berkeley)
- 2015 – Michael S. Levine (University of California, Berkeley / Lewis Sigler Institute, Princeton)
- 2016 - Kathryn V. Anderson (Sloan Kettering Institute)
- 2017 - Philippe M. Soriano (Icahn School of Medicine at Mount Sinai)
- 2018 - Robb Krumlauf (Stowers Institute for Medical Research)
- 2019 - Eric N. Olson (University of Texas Southwestern Medical Center)
- 2020 - Claude Desplan (New York University)

== See also ==
- List of biology awards
- List of medicine awards
- List of prizes named after people
