= John W. Saunders Jr. =

American scientist

John W. Saunders Jr. (November 12, 1919 – December 26, 2015) was an American scientist whose research in the field of developmental biology and zoology played an integral part in helping to understand how limbs develop in vertebrates. Saunders researched the vertebrate limb and studied the apical ectodermal ridge (AER). This research was critical for identifying growth factors secreted from the AER and what role these factors play in assisting the pattern of vertebrate limb development.

== Personal life ==
John W. Saunders Jr. was born in Muskogee, Oklahoma, on November 12, 1919. Saunders grew up very poor since his father, who worked as a barber, had his barbershop burned down in a fire. To support his family, he caddied at a golf course, and at 13, he worked at a restaurant for six days a week from 4 pm - 10 pm. He gave the money he earned to his family in order to help support them and he kept this job throughout high school. The lack of money and available jobs due to the Great Depression made it hard for Saunders and his family to make end meets during his childhood, and World War II forced him to put his graduate education on hold to serve his country in the US Navy.

Saunders first met his wife, Lilyan C. Saunders, in the 1930s while taking a histology class at the University of Oklahoma. They were married for 69 years and had five children. Additionally, he also had a sister named Virginia Lavarine. His son, William, and grandson, Danny Brown, died before him and his wife Lilyan also died in 2011.

Saunders died on December 26, 2015, in Falmouth, Massachusetts.

== Education and career ==
Saunders' high school was very small, and he only had six students in his graduating class. Even while working for six hours a day, six days a week, he was able to graduate high school with more than a 98 average in his classes. Saunders found it tough to get a job since the effects of the Great Depression were still present in Oklahoma at the time. Because of this, he struggled to make money so that he could attend junior college and pursue a higher education. Despite his mother and father not being educated past second and seventh grade, respectively, they both encouraged and pushed him to get an education. With the help of his mother, he enrolled in Muskogee Junior College. Additionally, he was also able to participate in a federal program that allowed students to work for the junior college doing various jobs and be paid twenty cents per hour for their work. At Muskogee Junior College, Saunders' education was mainly focused on English and public speaking, which he credits with contributing to his writing and speaking success later in his career. Saunders also studied French while in junior college and he had a classmate, whose father was an Oklahoma legislature senator, that was failing the class. Since Saunders excelled at French, the classmate's father hired him to tutor his son in French. The senator also told Saunders that if he helped his son pass the French course, then he would help Saunders pursue a higher education and get into a college. The senator helped Saunders get into the University of Oklahoma in 1936. He was also able to get Saunders a job working at the State Hospital in Norman during the school year and the State Highway Department in the summer so that he could earn money while attending college.

While attending the University of Oklahoma, Saunders's advisor was Professor Audie Richards. At the time, Richards was the chairman of the Department of Zoology at the University of Oklahoma, and he was also a former doctoral student of Princeton Professor Edwin Grant Conklin. Richards signed Saunders up to be a zoology major and he also minored in botany. Saunders started his master's degree in 1940 at the University of Oklahoma's zoology department where he wrote his thesis titled "Aberrant Mitosis in the Amnion of the Guinea Pig". Saunders then went on to graduate school at Johns Hopkins University in 1941, where he studied the AER in chick embryos. He received his doctorate in zoology from Johns Hopkins in 1948. From 1943 to 1946, Saunders served as an officer in the US Navy during World War II, during which he could not attend school. During his time in the US Navy, he served as a lieutenant on the USS Rocky Mount. His ship was a part of nine island-hopping invasions in the Pacific Ocean and he ended up in Shanghai, China, when the war ended.

Saunders presented his first presentation regarding the AER in Chicago at a meeting for the Society of Zoology. This presentation impressed Paul Weiss, who was a professor at the University of Chicago's Department of Zoology. Weiss then offered Saunders a job as a zoology instructor and researcher at his school, which Saunders accepted. However, Saunders's salary at this job was not sufficient for him to provide for his family while living in Chicago, so he left Weiss's lab after a year. Saunders went to work in Milwaukee, Wisconsin, for the biology department at Marquette University, where he served as a biology professor from 1949 to 1965 and chairman of the department from 1958 to 1965. Saunders spent the summer of 1954 doing research at the Mount Desert Island (MDI) Biological Laboratory, located in Salisbury Cove, Maine. While he was doing research at Marquette University, Saunders, along with his fellow colleague Mary Gasseling, studied the zone of polarizing activity (ZPA) and they were essential in identifying its role in the development of chick embryos. Saunders became an anatomy professor at the University of Pennsylvania from 1966 to 1967. Subsequently, he became a leading biology professor at the State University of New York (SUNY) at Albany from 1967 to 1985. After teaching for almost 20 years at Albany, Saunders retired. In 1985, he was named professor emeritus for his position as a biology professor at SUNY, Albany. Additionally, Saunders also spent his summers as an instructor teaching embryology at the Marine Biological Laboratory in Woods Hole, Massachusetts, from 1995 to 2003, and was previously a summer investigator at the facility from 1958 to 1972.

== Research ==
Saunders is most notable for his research concerning the apical ectodermal ridge (AER), which he studied for over 50 years. Saunders first began his research by studying the wing development of embryonic chickens, and he is considered a pioneer of many embryological experiments used to identify major signaling areas responsible for chick limb development. In his 1948 publication "The proximo-distal sequence of origin of the parts of the chick wing and the role of the ectoderm", Saunders first suggested that the apical ectoderm may potentially influence the areas involved in wing development of chicks. In this study, the apical ectoderms of wing buds were removed at various stages (stages 4–7) of wing development. The results from this study indicated that removal of the apical cap during stages 4–7 of wing development in the birds studied led to difficulties in the formation of fully developed wings. Based on this, Saunders conducted further research and was able to deduce that the distal portion of the wing is formed from the mesoderm in a small area at the top of the bud, which he termed as a region of "apical growth". Following this, he found that the lengthening of this region first led to the formation of the proximal region of the wing followed by the formation of the distal portion of the wing. Saunders also concluded that the differentiation pattern following this proximo-distal wing formation order was also connected to the apical growth region of the wing bud. Moreover, another big finding from this publication was that the ectodermal ridge controls the apical growth responsible for the proximo-distal formation pattern and that removing the ectodermal ridge prevents limbs that have not been formed yet from forming.

Saunders continued to study the AER and followed up his early work with more research on the apical zone as well as its role in the formation of wing limbs in chick embryos. In 1962, Saunders published an article titled "On the role of ectoderm in limb development" in which he made several promising conclusions. He concluded that when EDTA is used to remove the ectoderm from limb buds, regions towards the end of the limb do not form. However, he also found that, even in the absence of the apical ridge, limb buds with remaining ectodermal cells present after treatment with EDTA could still develop in their distal regions. Additionally, Saunders's study indicated that when ultrasound is used to remove the ectoderm of the limb buds, some of them may still develop at their end-regions even if there are no ectodermal cells present. However, they do not show development at their distal regions when treated for ectoderm removal by ultrasound.

In his 1963 publication "Trans-filter propagation of apical ectoderm maintenance factor in the chick embryo wing bud", Saunders was able to conclude that the wing bud's postaxial region maintains and contributes to the AER by providing apical ectodermal growth factor. Ultimately, this leads to the growth of the end-regions of the limb.

Saunders is also known for his work regarding cell death and its developmental contributions since he was among the first scientists to actually study the death of cells, commonly known as apoptosis. As with his previous work regarding the AER and limb formation, Saunders used chick embryos to study cell death by studying their development at various stages. In a 1962 publication, co-authored by Saunders, titled "Cellular death in morphogenesis of the avian wing", Saunders helped indicate posterior regions of the wing where many cells degenerated, and they termed this region the posterior necrotic zone (PNZ). Additionally, this study also concluded that development was not dependent on cell death, but that cell death worked with other developmental phenomena in forming the limb. Saunders built on this work in his 1966 publication "Death in Embryonic Systems". From this, he showed that some cases of cell death during embryonic development have useful purposes and that the death of cells can be controlled by certain cellular and humoral aspects of the environment.

During the 1970s, Saunders focused his work back on studying the AER and its role in the development of limbs in chick embryos. From his 1972 publication titled "Ectodermal-mesodermal interactions in the growth of limb buds in the embryo: Constancy and temporal limits of the ectodermal induction", Saunders was able to infer that the information required to synthesize and develop limbs is naturally programmed in the mesoderm. He made this inference based on the conclusion that the AER transfers developmental information by means of signal induction in a manner that remains constant between the various stages and levels that the bud goes through in its development. Furthermore, Saunders also found that the AER can induce the formation of the entire wing until stage 29 of development, but from this point onwards, it no longer possesses this ability.

In 1973, Saunders published a paper, in which he was a co-author, titled "Spatiotemporal distribution of mechanisms that control outgrowth and anteroposterior polarization of the limb bud in the chick embryo". In this publication, the researchers identified a posterior zone of specialized cells present in the initial stages of embryotic avian development which was called the zone of polarizing activity (ZPA). This study found that the ZPA initially begins to pick up its activity during stage 17 of avian embryotic development and continues to function at a high level until stages 27 and 28. However, the ZPA's activity declines rapidly after this and ceases at around stage 29. Another key finding from this study was that the ZPA's activity lies at different regions of the wing bud as the embryo transitions between various stages of its development and the researchers were able to identify these regions and the different developmental stages that they are associated with. The last key result from this publication was that the ZPA does not affect the anterioposterior development in avian embryos, but may affect their posterior limb differentiation, when it is removed before and during the various wing bud stages.

In 1976, Saunders illustrated the ability of the AER to contribute to the development of limbs that are situated in outer regions of the skeleton by using ectoderm not associated with limbs. He also observed the ability of dissociated cells of the AER to change the layout at the mesodermal apex in a normal AER. Saunders came to this conclusion because he observed the formation of whole limbs in the presence, but not in the absence, of ectodermal AER cells.

After this, Saunders set out to explore what happens to the marginal vasculature in the wings of chick embryos when the AER is removed at various stages during their development. He did exactly this and published his findings, along with Richard N. Feinberg, in their 1982 article titled "Effects of excising the apical ectodermal ridge on the development of the marginal vasculature of the wing bud in the chick embryo". According to this article, Saunders and Feinberg removed the AER of chick embryos during stages 17–23 of their development. After this, they observed how the vascular pattern during the development of the marginal vein of the chick embryos was affected by the removal of the AER. The scientists found that removing the AER before marginal vein formation led to the failure of the vein to develop at all, and they also observed that the proximal portion of the marginal vein does indeed continue to form proximally, but not distally, once the AER is removed. The overall results for this study show that proper vascular pattern and marginal vein formation in the wing bud region of chick embryos is dependent on the presence of the AER and that the AER is required for their development.

After his work with the AER and the development of embryotic avian limb buds in the 1980s, Saunders continued to study them more and published a few more papers during this time. He published his last paper in 2003 about his dear friend, and fellow scientist, John Philip Trinkaus, who had died earlier that year.

== Honors and awards ==
While studying at the University of Oklahoma in 1936, Saunders was a member of the Phi Beta Kappa academic honor society. During the early years of his career, he also became a member of the American Association for the Advancement of Science in 1946. He also became a member of the American Society of Zoologists (now called the Society for Integrative and Comparative Biology) in 1948 and served as program officer (1959-1962), membership committee chairman (1959-1960), chair of the developmental biology division (1963), and secretary (1964-1966). In 1950, Saunders became a member of the Wisconsin Academy of Sciences, Arts, and Letters. Saunders also became a member of corporation of the Mount Desert Island Biological Laboratory in 1954 and remained one until 1983. In 1957, he became a member of the International Society of Developmental Biologists and the American Institute of Biological Sciences. The following year in 1958, he also became a member of the New York Academy of Sciences. A year later, he became a member of corporation of the Marine Biological Laboratory (MBL) in 1959, and he served on the MBL's board of trustees from 1969 to 1972. Saunders was also a member of the American Society for Cell Biology (1960) as well as the Society for Experimental Biology and Medicine (1964). A few years later in 1966, he became a member of the Society for Developmental Biology (SDB), and he served on the SDB's executive committee (1967-1969) and was president of the organization for a year (1968). In 1969, Saunders also became a member of the Association for the Advancement of Ageing Research and was a council member for this association from 1969 to 1970. In 1996, he was awarded the Edwin Grant Conklin Medal by the American Society of Developmental Biology. Ten years later, he was elected to the National Academy of Sciences (2006), and he received the University of Oklahoma College of Arts and Sciences Distinguished Alumni Award the subsequent year in 2007. Saunders is also an emeritus of the American Association of Anatomists.
