= Walter Jakob Gehring =

Swiss developmental biologist (1939–2014)

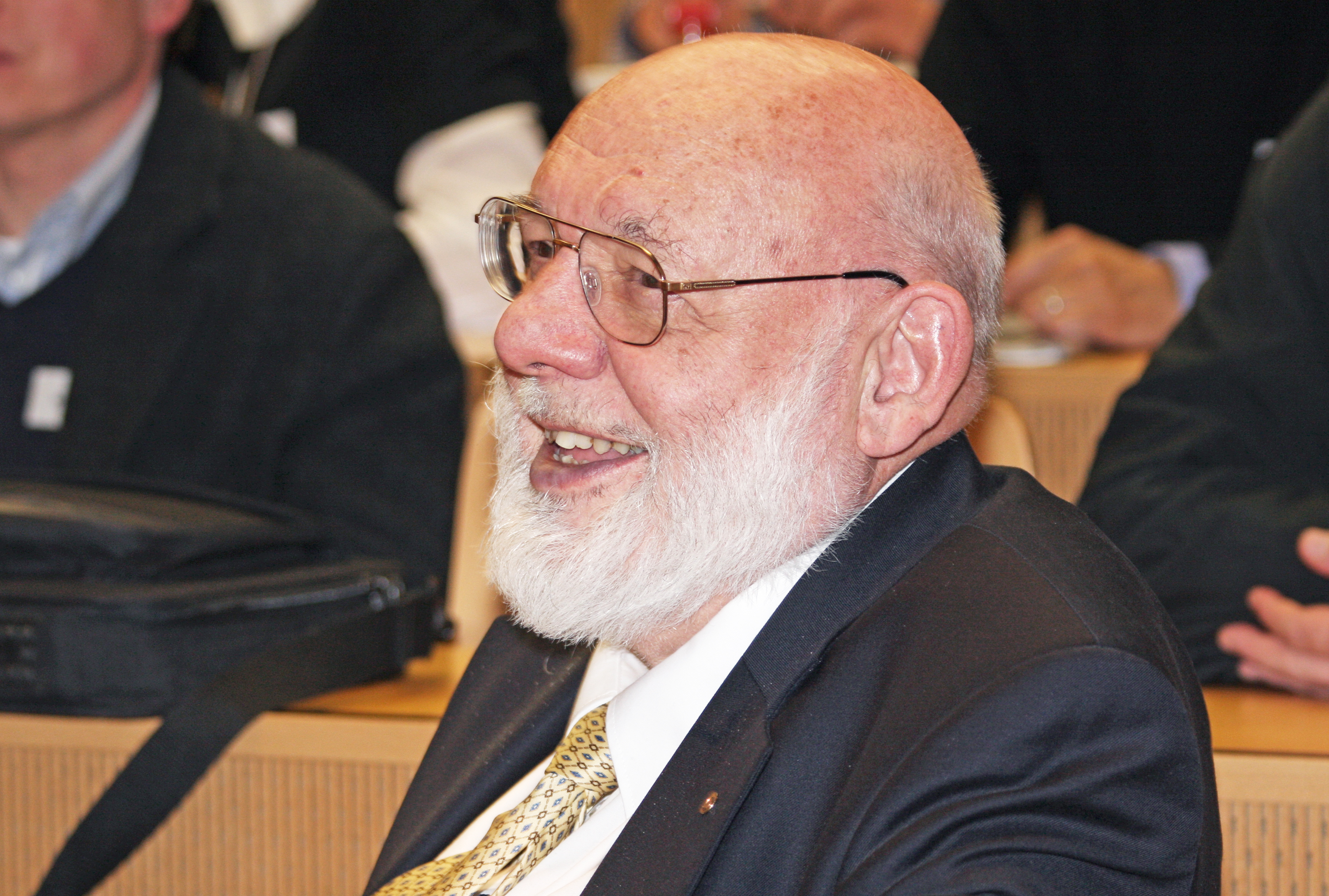
- Walter Jakob Gehring (2014)
- Born: 20 March 1939; Zürich, Switzerland
- Died: 29 May 2014 (aged 75); Basel, Switzerland
- Known for: Discovering the homeobox (DNA segment)
- Awards: Louis-Jeantet Prize for Medicine (1987)
- Scientific career
- Fields: Developmental Biologist
- Workplaces: University of Zurich, Yale Medical School, Yale University, Biozentrum University of Basel

Walter Jakob Gehring (20 March 1939 – 29 May 2014) was a Swiss developmental biologist who was a professor at the Biozentrum Basel of the University of Basel, Switzerland. He obtained his PhD at the University of Zurich in 1965 and after two years as a research assistant of Ernst Hadorn he joined Alan Garen's group at Yale University in New Haven as a postdoctoral fellow.

In 1969 he was appointed associate professor at Yale Medical School and 1972 returned to Switzerland to become a professor of developmental biology and genetics at the Biozentrum of the University of Basel. He was Secretary General of the European Molecular Biology Organization, President of the International Society of Developmental Biologists, and Foreign Member of the national academies of the USA, Great Britain, France, Germany and Sweden.

Gehring was mainly involved in studies of Drosophila genetics and development, particularly in the analysis of cell determination in the embryo and transdetermination of imaginal discs. He performed studies of the heat shock genes, various transposons, and the homeotic genes which are involved in the genetic control of development.

In 1983 Gehring and his collaborators (William McGinnis, Michael S. Levine, Ernst Hafen, Richard Garber, Atsushi Kuroiwa, Johannes Wirz), discovered the homeobox, a DNA segment characteristic for homeotic genes which is not only present in arthropods and their ancestors, but also in vertebrates including man.

Gehring was also involved in the development and application of enhancer trapping methods. He and his collaborators identified PAX6 as a master control gene for eye development, which led to a new theory about the monophyletic origin of the eyes in evolution.

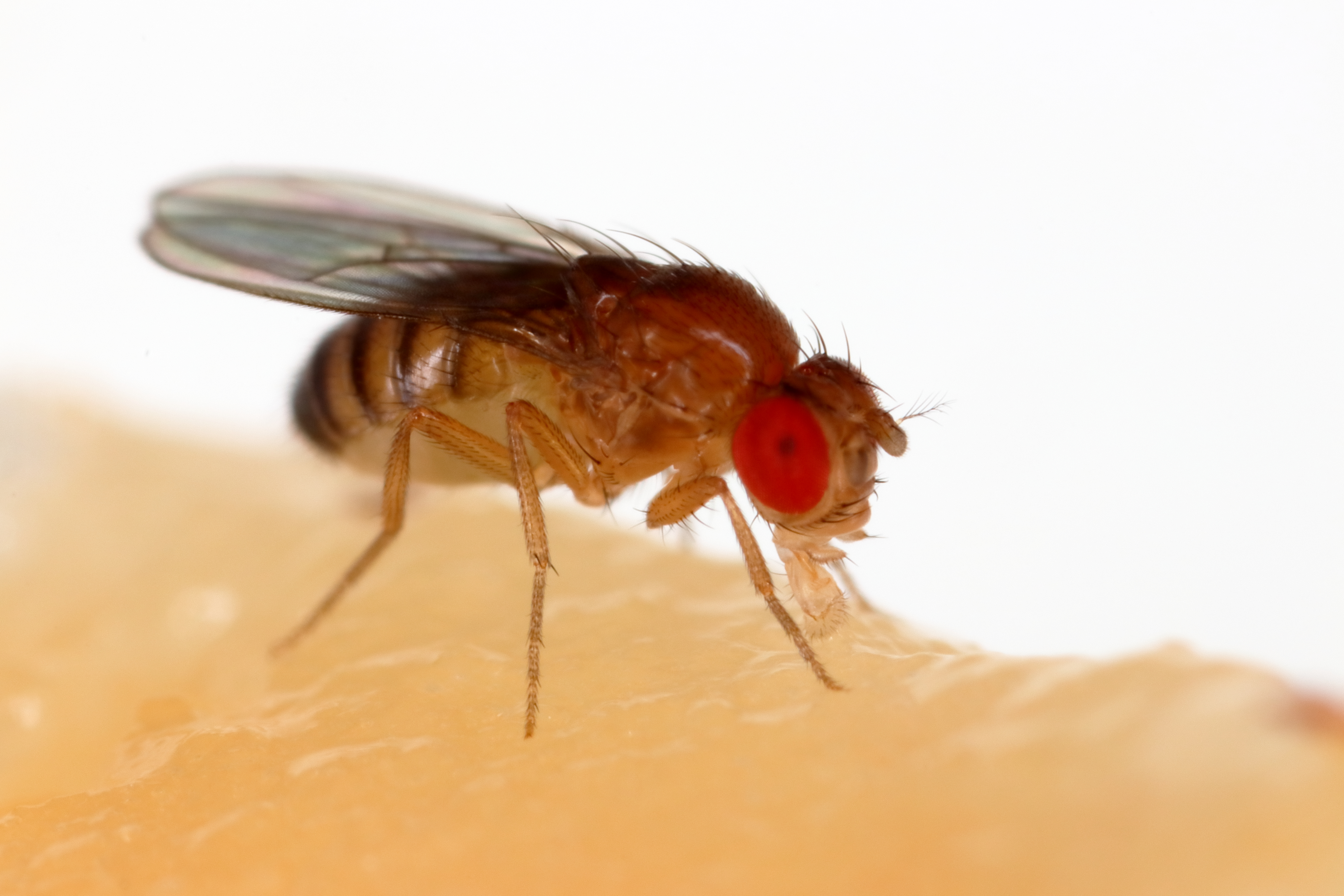
Drosophila Melanogaster, the object of Gehring's science (in which he studied genetics and development, particularly in the analysis of the embryo

Gehring's 1965 PhD dissertation at the University of Zürich, Übertragung und Änderung der Determinationsqualitäten in Antennenscheiben-Kulturen von Drosophila melanogaster, studied transdetermination in Drosophila imaginal discs.

== Awards ==
- 1987 Gairdner Foundation International Award
- 1987 Louis-Jeantet Prize for Medicine
- 1996 Awarded the Otto Warburg Medal
- 1997 Awarded the March of Dimes Prize in Developmental Biology.
- 2000 Received the Kyoto Prize for Basic Science.
- 2001 Alfred Vogt-Preis
- 2002 Received the Balzan Prize for Developmental Biology.
- 2003 A.O. Kovalevsky Medal
