= Claude Desplan =

French biologist

- Born: Algeria
- Education: École normale supérieure de Fontenay-Saint-Cloud (B.S.); Institut National de la Santé et de la Recherche Médicale (Ph.D.); University of California, San Francisco (Postdoc)
- Awards: National Academy of Sciences (2018); Edwin Grant Conklin Medal (2020)
- Scientific career
- Fields: Developmental Biology; Neuroscience
- Workplaces: New York University
- Website: wp.nyu.edu/desplanlab/

Claude Desplan, a biologist originally trained in France, has been a Silver Professor in New York University’s Department of Biology since 1999. His research centers on understanding the development and functioning of the visual system that underlies color vision using the fruit fly Drosophila as a model organism.

== Biography ==
Born in Algeria, Desplan completed his undergraduate training at the Ecole Normale Supérieure in St. Cloud, France in 1975 and he received a Ph.D. at the Institut National de la Santé et de la Recherche Médicale (INSERM) in Paris in 1983. His thesis work, done under the guidance of Mohsen Moukhtar and Monique Thomasset, focused on calcium regulation.

As a postdoctoral fellow in the laboratory of Pat O’Farrell at the University of California, San Francisco, Desplan worked on the functional specificity of homeodomain proteins. He demonstrated that this conserved signature of many developmental genes is a DNA binding motif. In 1987, he joined the faculty of Rockefeller University and was named a Howard Hughes Medical Institute Assistant and Associate Investigator. There, he pursued structural and functional studies of the homeodomain and Paired domain DNA binding domains and investigated the evolution of axis formation in insects. He accepted a position as Professor at New York University in 1999.

== Scientific work ==
=== Evolutionary developmental biology ===
Desplan's research has examined the evolution of developmental mechanisms across insect species. His early work investigated the role of the Bicoid homeoprotein in embryonic patterning, including its interactions with other developmental regulators. This work showed that Hunchback is sufficient to promote the formation of thoracic, but not head, segments. Although Bicoid has a central role in anterior patterning in Drosophila, it is absent outside higher Diptera. Desplan and colleagues developed the parasitoid wasp Nasonia as a model for studying the evolution of embryonic patterning. Like Drosophila, Nasonia undergoes long-germ development, in which most segments are specified nearly simultaneously. Their studies showed that Orthodenticle (Otd), which shares DNA-binding specificity with Bicoid but has a distinct evolutionary origin, forms anterior and posterior gradients that contribute to patterning both ends of the embryo. Otd acts with Hunchback and maternally localized Giant in anterior patterning and with maternally localized Caudal in posterior patterning. His group subsequently extended its evolutionary and developmental studies to ants. This work showed that disruption of pheromone-mediated olfaction affects social behavior and antennal-lobe development. The group has also investigated the regulation of the expanded olfactory receptor repertoire in ants and mechanisms associated with differences in lifespan between workers and queens.

=== Visual system development ===
Desplan's research on Pax6 led to studies of its role in visual-system development. His group showed that Rhodopsin genes share a common Pax6 homeodomain-binding site and characterized specialized photoreceptors involved in polarized-light detection. The group also showed that the transcription factor Spalt distinguishes photoreceptors associated with color vision from those associated with motion vision, and identified a post-mitotic role for the Hippo signaling pathway in photoreceptor fate specification. In the larval visual system, the group found that developmental signaling can induce photoreceptors to switch Rhodopsin expression in association with changes in circadian function. The laboratory also identified a feedback mechanism through which Rhodopsin expression contributes to the exclusion of other Rhodopsins within the same photoreceptor and characterized a short cis-regulatory element in which single base pair changes control subtype-specific Rhodopsin expression. Desplan's group has also studied the development of the optic lobe, including the regulation of neuronal number by programmed cell death and by the size of the progenitor domain from which neurons are generated.

=== Stochastic cell-fate specification ===
Desplan's group has investigated stochastic cell-fate decisions in the Drosophila retina, where different ommatidial subtypes are distributed in a stochastic pattern. The group showed that this choice is controlled by stochastic expression of the transcription factor Spineless in a subset of R7 photoreceptors. After characterizing the genetic network controlling photoreceptor subtype specification, they showed that the two spineless alleles initially make independent expression decisions, followed by interchromosomal communication that coordinates their expression within individual cells. The group subsequently examined the evolution of stochastic photoreceptor specification in other insects. In butterflies and wasps, pairs of R7-like photoreceptors can adopt blue- or ultraviolet-sensitive identities, producing different combinations of photoreceptor subtypes. CRISPR-mediated disruption of spineless demonstrated a role for the gene in regulating these fate choices. The laboratory has also investigated how stochastic photoreceptor identities influence the development of downstream neural circuits. In Drosophila, two classes of Dm8 neurons are specified independently of R7 subtype, but their subsequent survival depends on input from the corresponding R7 photoreceptors. This matching involves the cell-adhesion molecules Dpr11 and DIP-γ.

=== Generation of neuronal diversity ===
Desplan's group has used the Drosophila optic lobe as a model for investigating how neuronal diversity is generated during development. The optic lobe contains approximately 60,000 neurons comprising nearly 200 cell types organized into parallel circuits that maintain a retinotopic representation of the approximately 800 ommatidia of the compound eye. Studies of the medulla identified a series of transcription factors that are sequentially expressed in neuroblasts. As neuroblasts progress through these temporal transcription-factor windows, they generate distinct neuronal identities. This work established temporal patterning as an important mechanism for generating neuronal diversity in the Drosophila visual system, with parallels to temporal patterning mechanisms in vertebrate neural development. The group also showed that temporal patterning regulates neuronal survival and programmed cell death, with either Notch-ON or Notch-OFF progeny undergoing apoptosis depending on the temporal window. Neuronal diversity is further modified by spatially expressed transcription factors that interact with temporal patterning programs to generate region-specific neuronal types. More recently, single-cell RNA sequencing has been used to characterize the developmental trajectories and terminal differentiation of optic-lobe neurons, including mechanisms involved in specifying neurotransmitter identity.

=== Development of visual circuits ===
Desplan's group has investigated the development and function of neural circuits involved in motion vision in *Drosophila*. Studies of medulla neurons characterized parallel pathways that respond to moving bright and dark edges. Neurons with different response kinetics allow signals from neighboring points in visual space to be compared, providing a neural implementation of the Reichardt elementary motion detector. The group has also studied the development of lamina neurons, which receive input from photoreceptors and contribute to the separation of visual information into pathways for detecting bright and dark edges. This work identified a role for glial cells as signaling intermediates during development, relaying signals from photoreceptors that contribute to the specification of the major lamina neuron types. Further studies examined the development of T4 and T5 neurons, which are direction-selective neurons involved in motion processing. The group identified a developmental mechanism that generates T4 and T5 subtypes selective for each of the four cardinal directions while maintaining their organization within the retinotopic map.

== Honors and awards ==
- 2020 Awarded the Edwin Grant Conklin Medal by the Society for Developmental Biology
- 2018 Elected to the National Academy of Sciences.
