= Archives of Biochemistry and Biophysics =

- Discipline: Biochemistry, biophysics
- Language: English
- Edited by: Paul Fitzpatrick, Jian-Ping Jin, Henry Jay Forman

Publication details
- Former name(s): Archives of Biochemistry
- History: 1942–present
- Publisher: Elsevier (United States)
- Frequency: Biweekly
- Impact factor: 4.013 (2020)

Standard abbreviations
- ISO 4: Arch. Biochem. Biophys.

Indexing
- CODEN: ABBIA4
- ISSN: 0003-9861 (print); 1096-0384 (web)
- LCCN: 44005905
- OCLC no.: 637968940
- Molecular Cell Biology Research Communications
- ISSN: 1522-4724

Links
- Journal homepage; Online access

Archives of Biochemistry and Biophysics is a biweekly peer-reviewed scientific journal that covers research in biochemistry and biophysics. It is published by Elsevier. As of 2012, the editors-in-chief were Paul Fitzpatrick (University of Texas Health Science Center at San Antonio), Helmut Sies (University of Düsseldorf), Jian-Ping Jin (Wayne State University School of Medicine), and Henry Jay Forman (University of Southern California).

== History ==
The journal was established in 1942 by Academic Press as the Archives of Biochemistry, obtaining its current name in 1952. It absorbed the journal Molecular Cell Biology Research Communications (formerly section B of Biochemical and Biophysical Research Communications), which was published from 1999 to 2001. An index to authors for the first 75 volumes, covering the period from 1943 to 1958, was published in October 1959.

== Abstracting and indexing ==
The journal is abstracted or indexed in Biological Abstracts, Chemical Abstracts, Current Contents/Life Sciences, EMBASE, EMBiology, Excerpta Medica, Genetics Abstracts, MEDLINE, and the Science Citation Index. According to the Journal Citation Reports, the journal has a 2020 impact factor of 4.013.
