= Gail R. Martin =

American biologist (1944–2026)

Gail Roberta Martin
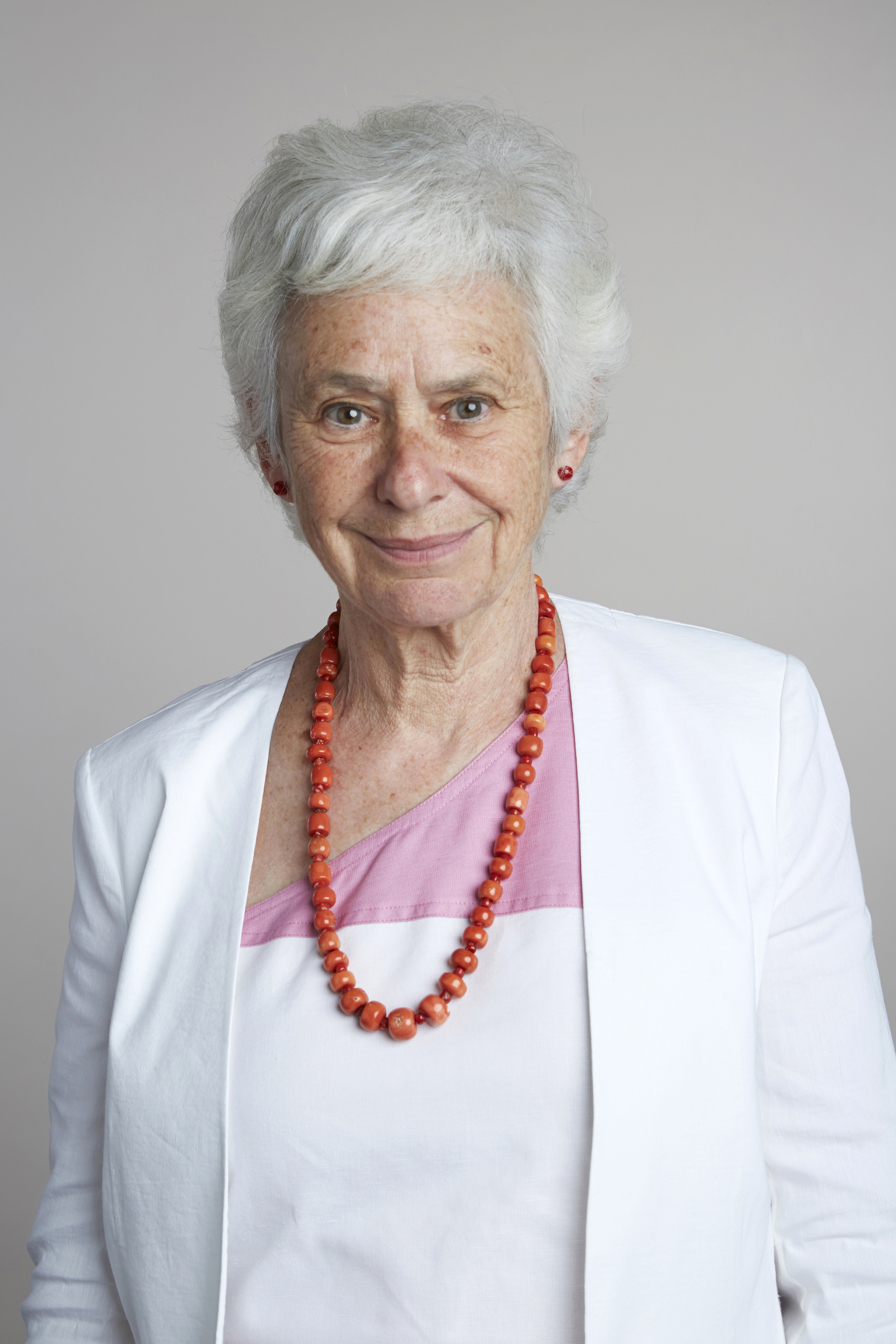
- Martin in 2015
- Born: Gail Roberta Zuckman; April 12, 1944; New York City, U.S.
- Died: February 9, 2026 (aged 81); San Francisco, California, U.S.
- Education: University of Wisconsin–Madison (UW-Madison); University of California Berkeley (UC Berkeley)
- Spouse: G. Steven Martin (m. 1969)
- Children: 1 son
- Awards: Member, US National Academy of Sciences; Foreign Member, Royal Society; Pearl Meister Greengard Prize; E.G. Conklin Medal
- Scientific career
- Fields: Developmental Biology
- Workplaces: University of California, San Francisco (UCSF)

Gail Roberta Martin (née Zuckman, April 12, 1944 – February 9, 2026) was an American developmental biologist. She is known for her pioneering work on the isolation and culture of pluripotent stem cells from normal embryos, for which she coined the term 'embryonic stem cells'. She is widely recognized for her work on the function of fibroblast growth factors and their negative regulators in vertebrate organogenesis. She and her colleagues also made contributions to gene targeting technology, especially the development of conditional gene knockouts.

== Early life and education ==
Martin grew up in The Bronx, New York, the only child of a pharmacist and a schoolteacher. She graduated from James Monroe High School in 1960 and earned her A.B. in Zoology from the University of Wisconsin in 1964. She then enrolled as a graduate student in the Department of Molecular Biology, University of California, Berkeley (UCB). It was a tumultuous time, because the student protest known as the Free Speech Movement took place in that academic year (1964–65), and Martin along with her fellow graduate students spent many hours in political discussion and activity. Martin did her doctoral work in Harry Rubin's laboratory, where she pursued several projects aimed at elucidating the mechanisms that control the growth of fibroblasts in vitro, specifically their growth in suspension compared to on tissue culture plastic. She completed her Ph.D. thesis in 1971. It was during that time that she married Steven Martin, a British scientist who had come to Berkeley to do postdoctoral work in the Rubin laboratory.

== Academic career ==
After completing her graduate studies, Martin and her husband moved to London. In 1973, she worked with Martin J. Evans at University College London. Evans was then working with teratocarcinomas (a type of tumor), which are of interest because they contain pluripotent stem cells (known as embryonal carcinoma, [EC] cells), from which all the differentiated cell types in the tumor arise. During the two years she spent working in Evans' laboratory, Martin devised a protocol for isolating and maintaining EC cells in the undifferentiated state and for differentiating them in vitro. This work laid the groundwork for the future isolation of pluripotent stem cells from normal mouse and human embryos. In 1976, Martin and her husband returned to Berkeley, where he took up a faculty position at the University of California, Berkeley and she began a year of postdoctoral work with Charles J. Epstein in the Department of Pediatrics at the University of California, San Francisco (UCSF). During this period she and her colleagues demonstrated that female EC cells had two active X chromosomes and could be used to study X-chromosome inactivation in vitro.

In 1976 Martin joined the UCSF faculty and established her own laboratory, which was active until 2012 in the UCSF Department of Anatomy. Her first major accomplishment was the isolation of pluripotent stem cells from normal mouse blastocysts. This was also achieved by Evans and Kaufman in the same year. Subsequently, using sophisticated genetic methods that she helped to pioneer, Martin and her colleagues demonstrated the importance of FGF signaling in the development of many organs including the limb. Martin's laboratory also took the lead in studying the role of negative feedback mechanisms for regulating FGF signaling in the mammalian embryo. These studies led to an appreciation of the exquisite sensitivity of developmental and cell biological processes to even small changes in the level of FGF signaling.

During her tenure at UCSF, Martin served as director of the Graduate Program in Developmental Biology (1986–2009). She also was responsible, in collaboration with a software engineer, Jonathan Scoles, for the development of a database that provides a description of all the genetically altered mice housed at UCSF. This online resource helps researchers determine if mice carrying a particular genetic alteration are available at UCSF and to find out whom to contact about the possibility of obtaining them. Access to this information has saved investigators considerable time and money in acquiring mouse models for their studies and been a stimulus to collaboration between researchers. From 2012 to 2026, she continued at UCSF as Professor Emeritus. In her post-retirement life she also served as a docent at the San Francisco Asian Art Museum.

== Death ==
Martin died after a brief illness in San Francisco on February 9, 2026, at the age of 81.

== Honors ==
Martin received numerous awards including an American Cancer Society Faculty Research Award (1979–83), a Guggenheim Fellowship (1991–92), the Edwin Grant Conklin Medal from the Society for Developmental Biology (2002), the Pearl Meister Greengard Prize (Rockefeller University), co-recipients: Beatrice Mintz and Elizabeth Robertson (2007), and the, FASEB Excellence in Science Award (2011).

She received an honorary doctorate of science (DSc [Med]) from University College London (2011). She has delivered numerous special lectures, including the George W. Brumley Jr. Memorial Lecture (Duke University) 2006, the UCSF Faculty Research Lecture (2008), and the Dame Anne McLaren Memorial Lecture (UK National Stem Cell Network), York, England (2011). She served as President of the Society for Developmental Biology (2006–2007), and was elected a fellow of the American Academy of Arts and Sciences (1991) a member of the US National Academy of Sciences (Section 22, Cell and Developmental Biology) (2002) and a Foreign Member, Royal Society (2015).

== Selected publications ==
- Frohman M.A.; Dush M.K.; Martin G.R. (1988). "Rapid production of full-length cDNAs from rare transcripts by amplification using a single gene-specific oligonucleotide primer". Proc. Natl. Acad. Sci. USA. 85 (23): 8998–9002. Bibcode:1988PNAS...85.8998F. doi:10.1073/pnas.85.23.8998. PMC 282649. PMID 2461560.
- Trumpp A., Depew M. J., Rubenstein J. L. R., Bishop J. M., Martin G.R. (1999). "Cre-mediated gene inactivation demonstrates that FGF* is required for cell survival and patterning of the first branchial arch". Genes Dev. 13 (23): 3136–3148. doi:10.1101/gad.13.23.3136. PMC 317178. PMID 10601039.
- Sun X.; Mariani F.; Martin G.R. (2002). "Functions of FGF signaling from the apical ectodermal ridge in limb development". Nature. 418 (6897): 501–508. Bibcode:2002Natur.418..501S. doi:10.1038/nature00902. PMID 12152071. S2CID 4409248.
- Mariani F.; Ahn C.; Martin G.R. (2008). "Genetic evidence that FGFs have an instructive role in limb proximal-distal patterning". Nature. 453 (7193): 401–405. Bibcode:2008Natur.453..401S. doi:10.1038/nature06876. PMC 2631409. PMID 18449196.
- Metzger R.J.; Klein O.D.; Martin G.R.; Krasnow M.A. (2008). "The branching programme of mouse lung development". Nature. 453 (7196): 745–750. Bibcode:2008Natur.453..745M. doi:10.1038/nature07005. PMC 2892995. PMID 18463632.
- Tang N.; Marshall W.; McMahon M.; Metzger R. J.; Martin G.R. (2011). "Control of mitotic spindle angle by the RAS-regulated ERK1/* pathway determines lung tube shape". Science. 333 (6040): 342–345. Bibcode:2011Sci...333..342T. doi:10.1126/science.1204831. PMC 4260627. PMID 21764747.
