= Mechanisms of Development =

- Discipline: Developmental biology
- Language: English
- Edited by: D. Wilkinson

Publication details
- Former name(s): Mechanisms of Development, Cell Differentiation and Development, Cell Differentiation
- History: 1972–present
- Publisher: Elsevier
- Frequency: Monthly
- Open access: Delayed, after 12 months
- Impact factor: 2.176 (2018)

Standard abbreviations
- ISO 4: Mech. Dev.

Indexing
- CODEN: MEDVE6
- ISSN: 0925-4773 (print); 1872-6356 (web)
- LCCN: 92645804
- OCLC no.: 22927690

Links
- Journal homepage; Online archive; Gene Expression Patterns

Mechanisms of Development is a peer-reviewed scientific journal covering all aspects of developmental biology. It is the official journal of the International Society of Developmental Biologists and is published by Elsevier. The journal was established in 1972 as Cell Differentiation and was renamed Cell Differentiation and Development in 1988. It acquired its current name in December 1990. The editor-in-chief is D. Wilkinson (National Institute for Medical Research). A separate section of the journal, Gene Expression Patterns, covers research on cloning and gene expression. In 2020 the journal became Cells & Development with the subtitle: 'Cell and Developmental Biology and their Quantitative Approaches'.

== Abstracting and indexing ==
The journal is abstracted and indexed in:

- Elsevier BIOBASE
- Biological & Agricultural Index
- Biological Abstracts
- BIOSIS Previews
- Chemical Abstracts
- Current Awareness in Biological Sciences
- Current Contents/Life Sciences
- EMBASE
- EMBiology
- Genetics Abstracts
- MEDLINE
- PASCAL
- FRANCIS
- Science Citation Index
- Scopus

According to the Journal Citation Reports, the journal has a 2015 impact factor of 2.041, whereas Gene Expression Patterns has an impact factor of 1.485.
