= Michael Levine (biologist) =

American biologist

Michael S. Levine
- Education: University of California, Berkeley (BA); Yale University (PhD)
- Known for: Homeobox; eve stripe-2; ascidian developmental biology
- Awards: NAS Award in Molecular Biology (1996)
- Scientific career
- Fields: Developmental biology
- Workplaces: Princeton University; University of California, Berkeley; University of California, San Diego; Columbia University
- Doctoral advisor: Alan Garen
- Doctoral students: Albert Erives

Notes
- Member of the National Academy of Sciences (1998)

Michael Levine is an American developmental and cell biologist at Princeton University, where he is the director of the Lewis-Sigler Institute for Integrative Genomics and a Professor of Molecular Biology.

Levine previously held appointments at the University of California, Berkeley, the University of California, San Diego, and Columbia University. He is notable for co-discovering the homeobox in 1983 and for discovering the organization of the regulatory regions of developmental genes.

== Biography ==
Levine was born in West Hollywood and raised in Los Angeles in America. Levine studied biology as an undergraduate at UC Berkeley, studying biology with Allan Wilson and graduating in 1976. He went on to graduate studies at Yale, where he studied with Alan Garen and in 1981 received a Ph.D. in molecular biophysics and biochemistry.

Levine joined the Princeton faculty in 2015, and had been a professor at UC Berkeley after leaving UCSD in 1996.

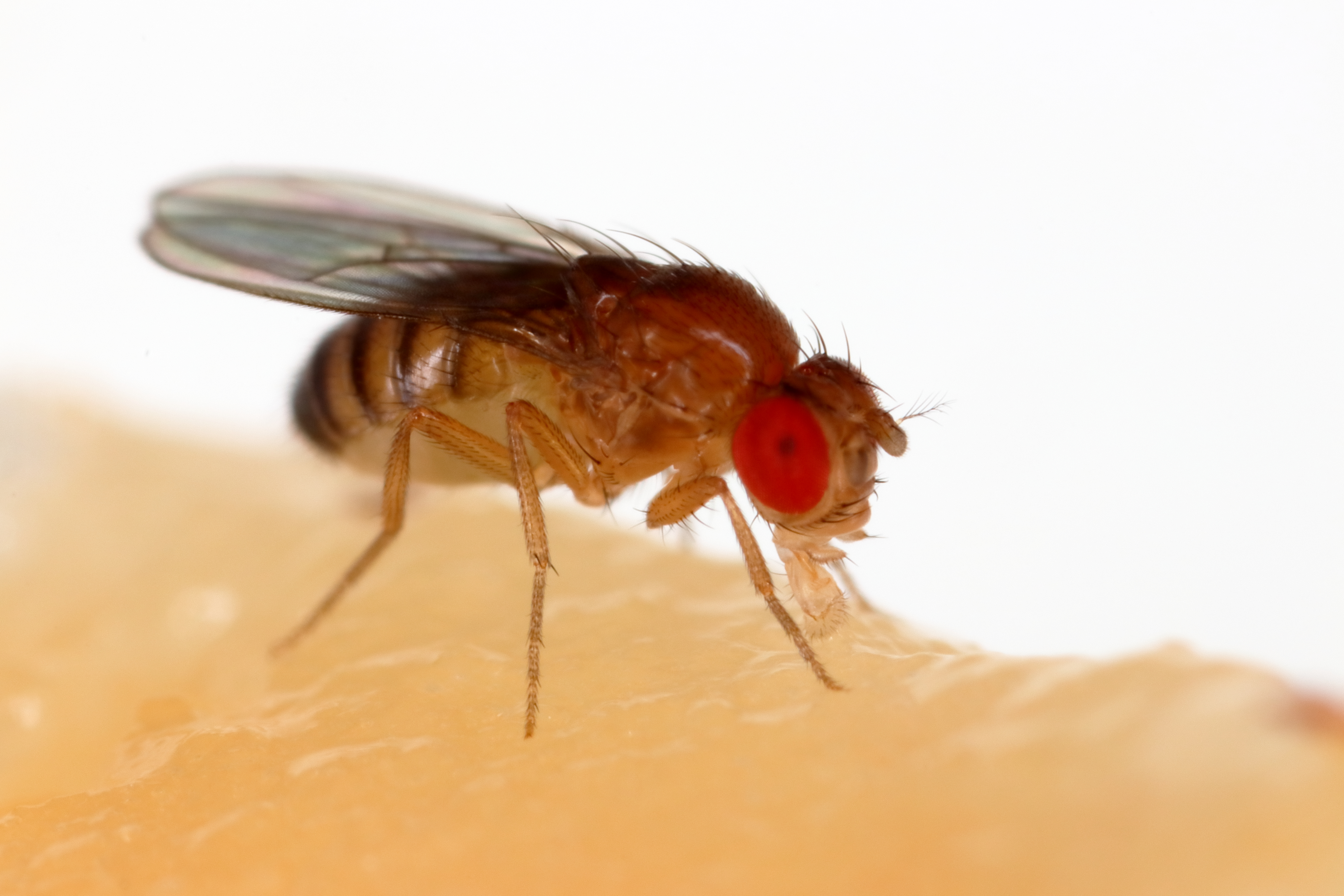
Drosophila Melanogaster, the object of Levine's science

=== Discoveries ===
==== Homeobox ====
Levine was a post-doc with Walter Gehring in Switzerland from 1982 to 1983. There, he co-discovered the homeobox with Ernst Hafen and fellow post-doc William McGinnis:

After learning that Ultrabithorax, a gene that specifies the development of wings, showed a localized pattern of expression similar to that of Antennapedia, they decided to revisit the classic papers of Ed Lewis. In 1978, Lewis had proposed that all these homeotic genes (the ones that tell animals where to put a wing and where to put a leg and so on) arose from a common ancestral gene. So McGinnis carved up the Antennapedia gene and, using those pieces as probes, the trio identified eight genes, which turned out to be the eight homeotic genes in flies. "That pissed off a lot of people," says Levine. "The homeotic genes were the trophies of the Drosophila genome. And we got 'em all. I mean, we got 'em all!" Far from being humble, Levine says, "We were like, 'We kicked your ass pretty good, didn't we, baby!' Those were the days."

==== eve stripe 2 enhancer ====
Levine briefly returned to UC Berkeley as a postdoctoral fellow with Gerry Rubin. He then joined the faculty of Columbia University, where he "led the discovery of the modular organization of the regulatory regions of developmental genes." After isolating the even-skipped (eve) gene, Levine's team determined that each of the seven stripes was produced by separate enhancers. With further study they discovered that both a set of activators and a set of repressors worked together to shape the expression of eve in the second stripe, and determined that the repressors shut down only their binding enhancers, leaving other enhancers free of repression. Joseph Corbo said of the work,

"Before Levine's studies of even-skipped stripe 2, it wasn't clear how you generated spatially restricted patterns of gene expression from initially broad crude gradients of morphogens. I think that the even-skipped stripe 2 studies were the defining studies that showed how an organism can interpret those gradients and turn them into specific patterns of gene expression. To me that's Mike's crowning achievement."

==== Ascidian Ciona ====
After earning tenure in only four years at Columbia, Levine moved to UCSD in 1991, where he added the sea squirt, Ciona intestinalis, to his repertoire. Much of Levine's work, including his homeobox studies, has been done in Drosophila. Levine's team is also prominent in work with the sea squirt, Ciona intestinalis, an invertebrate that facilitates study of development. For example, this work included insights into classical myodeterminants and the composition of the notochord, the defining tissue of the chordate phylum.

=== Awards ===
- 1982 – Jane Coffin Childs Postdoctoral Fellowship
- 1985 – Searle Scholars Research Fellowship
- 1985 – Alfred P. Sloan Fellowship
- 1996 – NAS Award in Molecular Biology - "For his insightful contributions to our understanding of gene regulation networks and molecular mechanisms governing the development of organisms with a segmented body plan."
- 1998 - Elected to United States National Academy of Sciences in "Cellular and Developmental Biology" section: "Utilizing an elegant blend of in vitro and in vivo studies, Levine carried out insightful and complete analysis of regulatory events that govern segmentation and dorsal-ventral polarity in Drosophila. His work provided a dramatic example of combinatorial regulation at a complex enhancer and established new paradigms for transcriptional control."
- 2009 – Wilbur Cross Medal (Yale Alumni Association)
- 2015 – Edwin G. Conklin Medal from the Society for Developmental Biology

=== Professional relations ===
Levine cites as a significant influence his instructor Fred Wilt (taking his developmental biology class "was probably the single most galvanizing experience I had in terms of defining my future goals"), and cites fellow scientists Eric Davidson, Peter Lawrence and Christiane Nusslein-Volhard as "mentors [and] friends ... over the years".

On choosing to become a research biologist, he described some family pressure to become a doctor ("Coming from a modest background, particularly a Jewish family, the pressure to become a doctor was intense"),

Fellow biologist Sean Carroll said of Levine, "Mike's work has done for animal development what the work on the lac operon and phage lambda did for understanding gene regulation in simpler organisms ... [Those] two big discoveries had a very large conceptual significance for developmental biology and by extension for evolutionary biology."

== Notable papers ==
- McGinnis, W.; Levine, M. S.; Hafen, E.; Kuroiwa, A.; Gehring, W. J. (1984). "A conserved DNA sequence in homoeotic genes of the Drosophila Antennapedia and bithorax complexes". Nature. 308 (5958): 428–33. Bibcode:1984Natur.308..428M. doi:10.1038/308428a0. PMID 6323992. S2CID 4235713. (the homeobox paper)
- Han, Kyuhyung; Levine, Michael S.; Manley, James L. (1989). "Synergistic activation and repression of transcription by Drosophila homeobox proteins". Cell. 56 (4): 573–83. doi:10.1016/0092-8674(89)90580-1. PMID 2563673. S2CID 41210570.
- Small, S; Blair, A; Levine, M (1992). "Regulation of even-skipped stripe 2 in the Drosophila embryo". The EMBO Journal. 11 (11): 4047–57. doi:10.1002/j.1460-2075.1992.tb05498.x. PMC 556915. PMID 1327756.
- Arora, K; Levine, M S; O'Connor, M B (1994). "The screw gene encodes a ubiquitously expressed member of the TGF-beta family required for specification of dorsal cell fates in the Drosophila embryo". Genes & Development. 8 (21): 2588–601. doi:10.1101/gad.8.21.2588. PMID 7958918.
- Cai, Haini; Levine, Michael (1995). "Modulation of enhancer-promoter interactions by insulators in the Drosophila embryo". Nature. 376 (6540): 533–6. Bibcode:1995Natur.376..533C. doi:10.1038/376533a0. PMID 7637789. S2CID 4267876.
- Arnosti, DN; Barolo, S; Levine, M; Small, S (1996). "The eve stripe 2 enhancer employs multiple modes of transcriptional synergy". Development. 122 (1): 205–14. doi:10.1242/dev.122.1.205. PMID 8565831.
- Zhou, J; Barolo, S; Szymanski, P; Levine, M (1996). "The Fab-7 element of the bithorax complex attenuates enhancer-promoter interactions in the Drosophila embryo". Genes & Development. 10 (24): 3195–201. doi:10.1101/gad.10.24.3195. PMID 8985187.
- Nibu, Yutaka; Zhang, Hailan; Bajor, Ewa; Barolo, Scott; Small, Stephen; Levine, Michael (1998). "DCtBP mediates transcriptional repression by Knirps, Krüppel and Snail in the Drosophila embryo". The EMBO Journal. 17 (23): 7009–20. doi:10.1093/emboj/17.23.7009. PMC 1171049. PMID 9843507.
- Ohtsuki, S; Levine, M; Cai, HN (1998). "Different core promoters possess distinct regulatory activities in the Drosophila embryo". Genes & Development. 12 (4): 547–56. doi:10.1101/gad.12.4.547. PMC 316525. PMID 9472023.
- Mannervik, M.; Nibu, Y; Zhang, H; Levine, M (1999). "Transcriptional Coregulators in Development". Science. 284 (5414): 606–9. Bibcode:1999Sci...284..606.. doi:10.1126/science.284.5414.606. PMID 10213677.
- Markstein, Michele; Markstein, Peter; Markstein, Vicky; Levine, Michael S. (2002). "Genome-wide analysis of clustered Dorsal binding sites identifies putative target genes in the Drosophila embryo". Proceedings of the National Academy of Sciences. 99 (2): 763–8. Bibcode:2002PNAS...99..763M. doi:10.1073/pnas.012591199. JSTOR 3057639. PMC 117379. PMID 11752406.
- Stathopoulos, Angelike; Levine, Michael (2002). "Dorsal Gradient Networks in the Drosophila Embryo". Developmental Biology. 246 (1): 57–67. doi:10.1006/dbio.2002.0652. PMID 12027434.
- Zeitlinger, Julia; Stark, Alexander; Kellis, Manolis; Hong, Joung-Woo; Nechaev, Sergei; Adelman, Karen; Levine, Michael; Young, Richard A (2007). "RNA polymerase stalling at developmental control genes in the Drosophila melanogaster embryo". Nature Genetics. 39 (12): 1512–6. doi:10.1038/ng.2007.26. PMC 2824921. PMID 17994019.
