= William McGinnis (disambiguation) =

William McGinnis may refer to:

- William McGinnis (fl. 1980s–2020s), American molecular biologist
- Will McGinnis (fl. 1980s–2010s), musician in Christian rock band Audio Adrenaline
- William H. McGinnis (1855–1930), justice of the Supreme Court of Appeals of West Virginia
