= Henry Forman =

Henry Forman may refer to:

- Henry Jay Forman, professor of gerontology, and of biochemistry
- Henry James Forman (1879–1966), author
- Harry Buxton Forman (1842–1917), bibliographer and antiquarian bookseller
