= Takeichi =

- Gender: Male

Origin
- Origin: Japanese
- Meaning: Different meanings depending on the kanji used

Takeichi (written: 竹一 or 武一) is a masculine Japanese given name. Notable people with the name include:

- Takeichi Harada (原田 武一) (1899–1978), Japanese tennis player
- Takeichi Nishi (西 竹一) (1902 – c. 1945), Japanese equestrian and Imperial Japanese Army officer

Takeichi (written: 竹市) is also a Japanese surname. Notable people with the surname include:

- Masatoshi Takeichi (竹市 雅俊) (born 1943), Japanese developmental biologist
