= Kathryn Virginia Anderson =

American developmental biologist (1952–2020)

Kathryn Virginia Anderson was an American developmental biologist researching about the various gene and protein interactions that guide the process of embryogenesis and especially neurulation.

== Early life and education ==
Anderson was born in La Jolla, San Diego in 1952. She was schooled at Point Loma High School and she has ascribed her interest in biological sciences to its biology teacher and parents. She graduated from University of California, Berkeley in biochemistry. In 1973, she began her post-graduate studies in neurodevelopment at Stanford University and left after 2 years.

She then enrolled at the UCSF School of Medicine, from what she terms as a "desire to do something for the humanity". However, she disliked the shift from basic sciences and left the course. In 1977, she opted for doctoral studies in the field of genetics with Judith Lengyel at University of California, Los Angeles, which spanned upon the biochemistry of Drosophila development, specifically examining the co-relation of DNA replication with histone mRNA synthesis. She received her Ph.D. degree in 1980.

== Career and research ==
As molecular biology and developmental biology were becoming intrinsically linked, she moved to the Friedrich Miescher laboratory, Germany in 1981 (which had been launched one month before) to work with Christiane Nüsslein Volhard on the genetic control of embryonic development in Drosophila. Combining embryological manipulation with developmental genetics, they identified the molecules that controlled various embryological processes and in particular, the dorsal-ventral signaling.

In 1985, Anderson became an assistant professor at the Department of Molecular and Cell Biology over University of California, Berkeley. She continued her work, identifying several genes involved in dorsal-ventral patterning and cloning them, especially the Toll gene. She also delineated the genetic pathway that de-differentiates the various cell types.

From 1993 to 1994, she carried out research in mouse embryonics at the National Institute for Medical Research, United Kingdom under the guidance of Rosa Beddington.

In 1996, she joined the Molecular Biology Program at the Memorial Sloan Kettering Cancer Center, New York.

== Personal life ==
She married Timothy Bestor, a fellow geneticist at Columbia University in 2004.

She died on November 30, 2020.

== Honors ==
She was elected to the National Academy of Science in 2002. She has been awarded with the Thomas Hunt Morgan Medal in 2012 by Genetics Society of America for her lifetime contributions to genetics. She was also awarded the Edwin Grant Conklin Medal by the Society for Developmental Biology in 2016. In 2013, Federation of American Societies for Experimental Biology honored her with the Excellence in Science Award.
