= Viktor Hamburger =

German professor and embryologist (1900–2001)

- Born: July 9, 1900; Landeshut, Silesia
- Died: June 12, 2001 (aged 100); St. Louis, Missouri
- Education: University of Freiburg
- Known for: Nerve growth factor
- Scientific career
- Fields: Embryology
- Workplaces: Washington University in St. Louis
- Doctoral advisor: Hans Spemann

Viktor Hamburger (July 9, 1900 – June 12, 2001) was a German-American professor and embryologist. His collaboration with neuroscientist Rita Levi-Montalcini resulted in the discovery of nerve growth factor. In 1951 he and Howard Hamilton published a standardized stage series to describe chicken embryo development, now called the Hamburger-Hamilton stages. He was considered "one of the most influential neuroembryologists of the twentieth century".

== Early life ==
Hamburger was born on July 9, 1900 in Landeshut, Silesia, Germany to Max Hamburger and Else Gradenwitz. After completing gymnasium in June 1918, Hamburger was inducted into the German army, but was released after the Armistice later that year. The army had discharged him in the city of Breslau, and he began his university studies there, moving to Heidelberg for the academic year of 1919–1920. However, in the spring of 1920 he was attracted to move to Freiburg, where he went on to complete his Ph.D. in the laboratory of embryologist Hans Spemann in 1925.

== Career ==
Hamburger was doing post-doctoral research at the University of Chicago when the Nazis came to power in Germany, and was able to remain in the US through the assistance of the Rockefeller Foundation.

Hamburger began to work at Washington University in St. Louis in 1935; he retired from his professor position in 1969 and continued researching until the 1980s.

In 1947 Hamburger recognized and brought to the United States a post-doctoral fellow named Rita Levi-Montalcini. Their subsequent collaboration resulted in the discovery of nerve growth factor. This work was continued by Dr. Levi-Montalcini and Dr. Cohen to which they would be awarded the 1986 Nobel Prize in Physiology or Medicine. Dr. Hamburger was excluded as a recipient for the Nobel Prize, although the NGF work by Dr. Levi-Montalcini and Dr. Cohen was based upon work by Dr. Hamburger and was carried out in his laboratory at Washington University in St. Louis. Dr. Levi-Montalcini also publicly marginalized Hamburger’s role in the NGF work.

In 1951 Hamburger and Howard Hamilton in 1951 published the Hamburger-Hamilton stages. They believed developmental biologists should have a well-grounded reference system to identify the stages of embryo development. This would facilitate comparisons between experiments in different laboratories. The devised their stage series based on visible anatomical characteristics, chosen on the basis of clearly identifiable external features and that the successive stages should be spaced closely together as possible and include quantitative measurements, such a beak or toe length.

In the 1960s, Hamburger did embryological work that established that chick movements in embryo were spontaneous patterns, a finding that contradicted contemporary assertions of behavioral psychologists.

Hamburger later revisited nerve growth factor, demonstrating that it was required for the maintenance of neural cells.

== Selected awards ==
- 1953 – Inducted into National Academy of Sciences
- 1976 – Honorary doctorate, Washington University in St. Louis
- 1978 – Wakeman Award for Research in the Neurosciences
- 1981 – Ross Harrison Prize from the International Society of Developmental Biologists, shared with Donald Brown
- 1983 – Louisa Gross Horwitz Prize of Columbia University with Stanley Cohen and Rita Levi-Montalcini
- 1984 – Honorary doctorate from Faculty of Mathematics and Science, Uppsala University
- 1985 – Ralph W. Gerard Prize in Neuroscience from the Society for Neuroscience
- 1989 – National Medal of Science
- 1990 – Karl Spencer Lashley Award of the American Philosophical Society
- 2000 – Lifetime Achievement Award, Society for Developmental Biology
