= Janet Rossant =

Biologist

Janet Rossant CC, FRS, FRSC
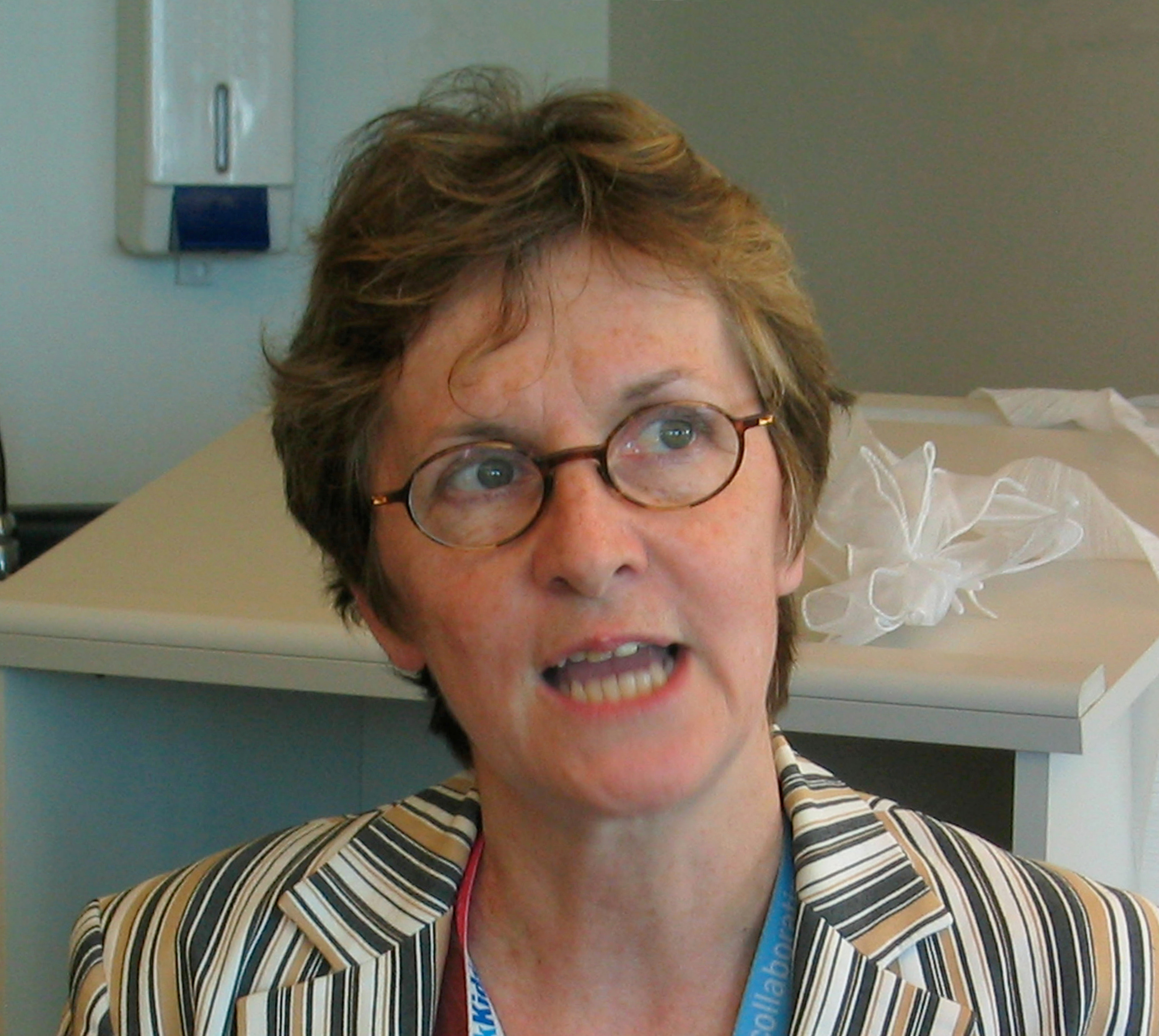
- Born: 13 July 1950 (age 76); Chatham, Kent, England
- Education: University of Cambridge, England University of Oxford, England
- Known for: Work in developmental biology, stem cells, and cell lineage
- Spouse: Alex Bain
- Children: Jennifer and Robert
- Awards: Fellow of the Royal Society, Howard Hughes International Scholar, Fellow of the Royal Society of Canada
- Scientific career
- Thesis: Studies on determination and differentiation in the early mammalian embryo (1975)

Janet Rossant, CC, FRS, FRSC (born 13 July 1950) is a developmental biologist well known for her contributions to the understanding of the role of genes in embryo development. She is a leader in developmental biology. Her current research interests focus on stem cells, molecular genetics, and developmental biology. Specifically, she uses cellular and genetic manipulation techniques to study how genes control both normal and abnormal development of early mouse embryos. Rossant has discovered information on embryo development, how multiple types of stem cells are established, and the mechanisms by which genes control development. In 1998, her work helped lead to the discovery of the trophoblast stem cell, which has assisted in showing how congenital anomalies in the heart, blood vessels, and placenta can occur.

She is currently the President and Science Director at Gairdner, a senior scientist in the Developmental & Stem Cell Biology Program, the chief of research at the Hospital for Sick Children (SickKids) Research Institute in Toronto, a university professor at the University of Toronto in the departments of Molecular Genetics, Obstetrics/Gynecology, Pediatrics, deputy scientific director of the Canadian Stem Cell Network, and the senior editor of the journal eLife. In 2013, she was the president of International Society for Stem Cell Research.

== Education ==
Janet Rossant received her B.A. in zoology from the University of Oxford, England, in 1972, graduating with Honors 1st Class. She then earned her PhD in mammalian development from Darwin College, University of Cambridge, England, in 1976.

== Sick Kids Lab ==
Rossant's lab is based in Toronto, Canada, at the SickKids, and focuses on stem cell and embryonic research. The lab specifically focuses on how cells in the early mouse embryos decide their fate and how this information can be applied to maintaining and differentiating embryo-derived stem cells. They then use this information to research how to change human iPS cells (induced pluripotent stem cells) into cell types that are useful for investigating human cell biology and disease. Her research includes using genetic manipulation, live imaging, proteomics and single cell expression analysis to study fundamental lineage development.

== Awards ==
Rossant has won numerous awards in cell and developmental biology. Notably, she won the 2015 Gairdner Wightman Award for her work with the SickKids Research Institute. The Gairdner Foundation presented her with this award "for her outstanding scientific contributions to developmental biology and for her exceptional international leadership in stem cell biology and policy-making, and in advancing research programs for children’s illnesses." Her contributions have impacted the way we understand the human genome, congenital abnormalities, and the use of cancer drugs. Her innovation in manipulation of the mouse genome led to the mouse becoming the dominant model in understanding the function of the human genome sequence.

In 2007, Rossant was awarded the Edwin G. Conklin medal from the Society for Developmental Biology, recognising her extraordinary research contributions and mentorship in the field.

Dr. Rossant was awarded the Ross G. Harrison Prize from the International Society of Developmental Biologists in 2013 at the 17th International Congress of Developmental Biology on 17 June in Cancun, Mexico. In this lifetime achievement award, given out once every four years, the society highlighted Rossant's impact in helping researchers understand human embryo development and stem cell origin, as well as developing the technique of introducing targeted mutations into genes of mouse embryos.

Rossant has called attention to the immense contributions of female scientists, and was one of five women to win the 2018 L’Oréal-UNESCO For Women in Science Award. In response to the award, Rossant stated, "I hope to use this opportunity to encourage more girls globally to take up careers in science, math, engineering and medicine. The future is theirs to grasp."

== Selected publications ==
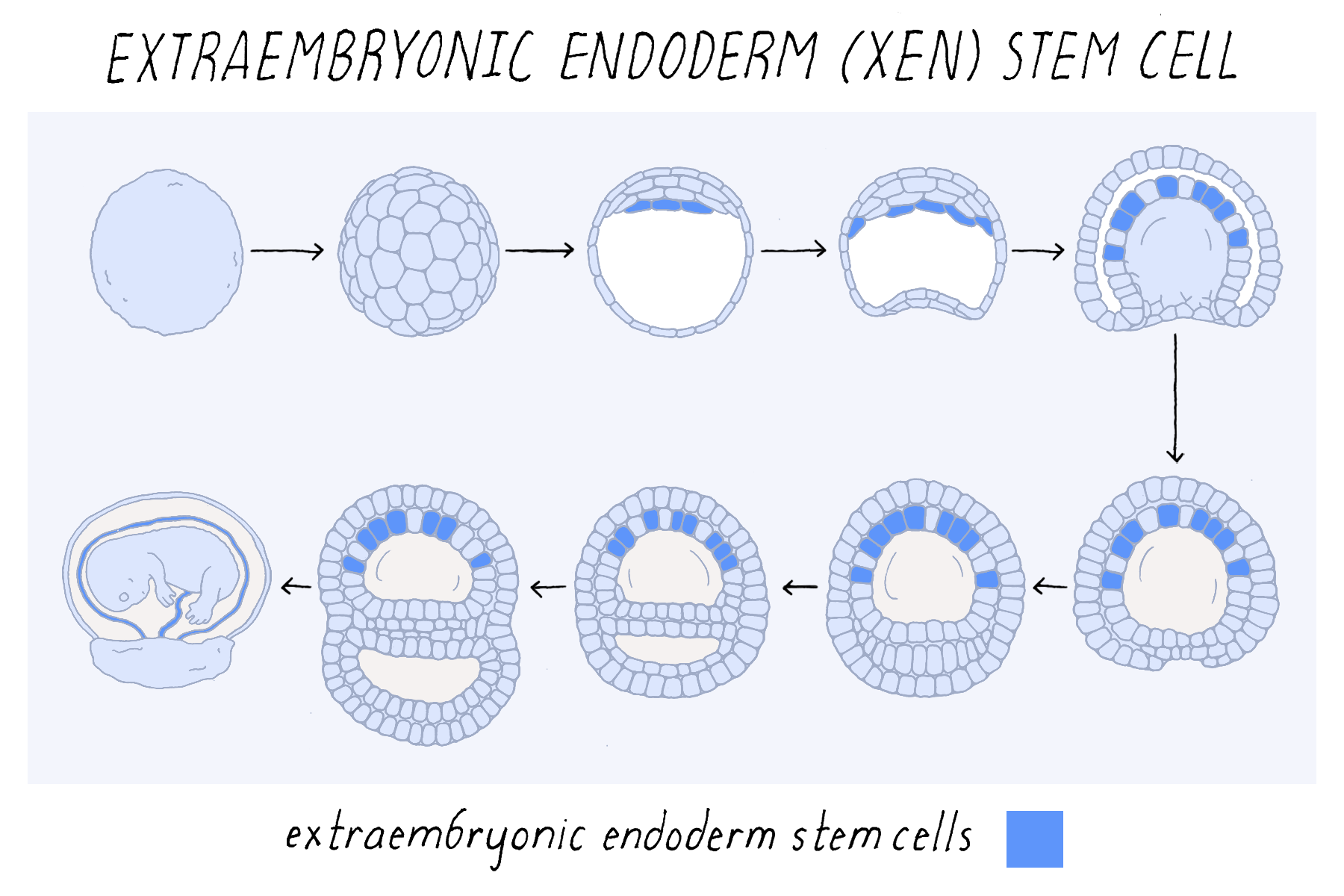
An XEN is a type of stem cell that forms support tissue for the embryo, but is not part of the embryo itself.

More publications may be accessed at PubMed.

Embryonic Research

Rossant's research in cell reprogramming has built a foundation for proteomic stem cell resources, and given researchers new methods to understand the mechanisms that regulate cell fate specification. This research identified cell surface markers to monitor cellular differentiation of embryonic (ES), epiblast (EpiSC), trophoblast (TS), and extraembryonic endoderm (XEN) stem cell lineages.

Stem Cell Research

A notable segment of Rossant's research has been her work leading to the 1998 discovery of the trophoblast stem cell. Her work led to the ability to isolate permanent trophoblast stem cell lineages using fibroblast growth factor 4 (FGF4) in contact with mouse blastocysts or early postimplantation trophoblasts. These trophoblast lineages are crucial for the survival of the mammalian embryo in utero.

Rossant's work on mice lung tissue is also very significant. Her work focused on using pluripotent stem cells to create lung epithelial tissue in mice, and examining the potential effects of these results in human medicine. This information was intended to benefit the current understanding of the pluripotent stem cell, as well as examining the potential of these cells in future regenerative medicine, discovering new facets of lung diseases, and improving treatment of lung diseases.
