= Claudio Daniel Stern =

Uruguayan biologist (born 1954)

Professor Claudio Daniel Stern FRS FRSB FMedSci
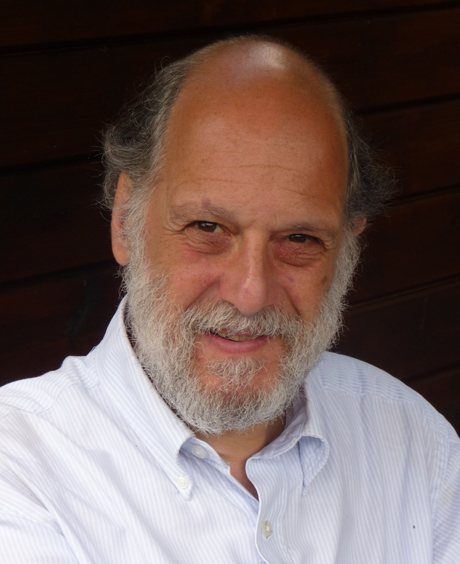
- Born: February 9, 1954 (age 72); Montevideo, Uruguay
- Scientific career
- Fields: Biology
- Website: www.ucl.ac.uk/biosciences/people/claudio-d-stern

Claudio Daniel Stern (born 9 February 1954 in Montevideo, Uruguay) is a British-Uruguayan biologist currently working at University College London (UCL).

== Education ==
Stern received his primary (Escuela Evaristo Ciganda) and secondary (Liceo Suarez and Lycée Français) education in Montevideo, Uruguay, and started to study Medicine in 1971. In 1972 he moved to the United Kingdom and took a BSc (Hons) in Biological Sciences at the University of Sussex, where he remained for his PhD (1978), under the supervision of Brian Goodwin. He then moved to the Department of Anatomy and Developmental Biology at University College London for postdoctoral training with Ruth Bellairs, a noted embryologist.

== Career ==
Following his postdoctoral training, Stern held a University Demonstrator-ship in Anatomy at the University of Cambridge (1984–85) before being appointed Lecturer in the Department of Human Anatomy at the University of Oxford, and Student (College Fellow) of Christ Church (1985-1994). In 1994 he was recruited as Chairman of the Department of Genetics and Development at Columbia University in New York. He returned to the UK in 2001 as the "J Z Young" Professor and Head of the Department of Anatomy and Developmental Biology back at University College London. Among many activities he is currently a member of Scientific Council of Institut Pasteur in Paris (since 2012) and was President of the International Society of Developmental Biologists (ISDB) from January 2010 to December 2013.

Stern's research is on the processes that establish cell diversity and pattern at early stages of development in vertebrate embryos.

== Honours ==
Stern was awarded a Doctor of Science (DSc) in Physiological Sciences from the University of Oxford (1993) and has been elected a Fellow of the Royal Society of Biology (FRSB) (2008), of the Academy of Medical Sciences (FMedSci) (2001), of the Royal Society (FRS) (2008), a member of EMBO (2002) and of the Academia Europaea (2013), and Foreign Member (Miembro Correspondiente) of the Latin-American Academy of Sciences] (ACAL) (2002) and Foreign Honorary Member of the American Academy of Arts and Sciences (AAAS). In 2006 he was awarded the Waddington Medal of the British Society for Developmental Biology. In 2023 he was elected as a Foreign Member ("miembro correspondiente") of the National Academy of Sciences of Uruguay (ANCIU). He has also given numerous plenary, keynote and named lectures at international meetings.

He was awarded the Ross Harrison Prize for 2017 by the International Society of Developmental Biologists.

== Publications ==
Stern has published about 200 scientific articles and several books including an important comprehensive book about gastrulation, "Gastrulation: from cells to embryo" (2004) and the widely used laboratory manual "Essential Developmental Biology: a practical approach" (with Peter W. H. Holland, 1993).
