= Clement Markert =

American biologist

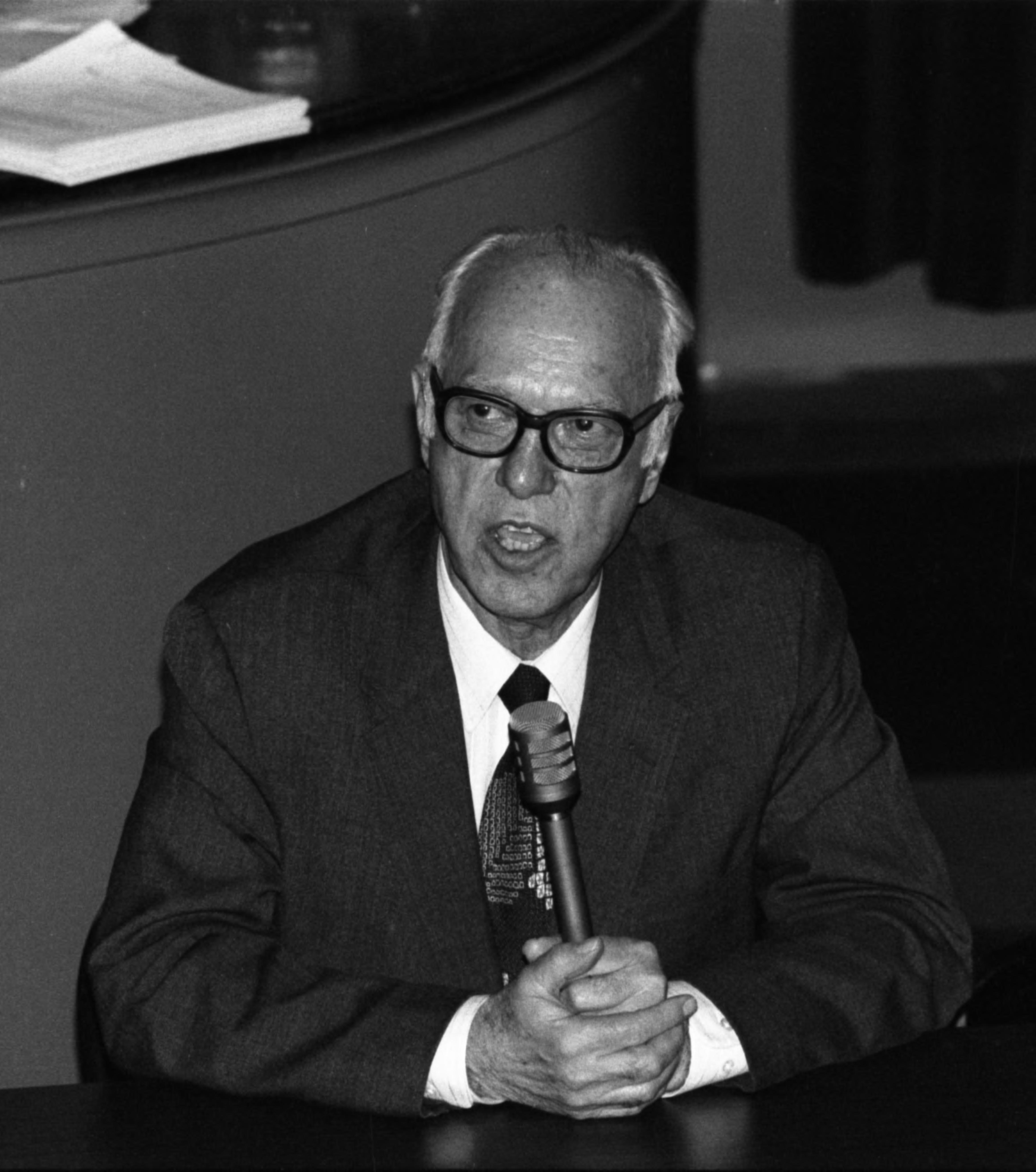
- Clement Markert at a symposium in 1991
- Born: April 11, 1917; Las Animas, Colorado, U.S.
- Died: October 1, 1999 (aged 82); Colorado Springs, Colorado, U.S.
- Education: University of Colorado, UCLA, Johns Hopkins University (Ph.D. 1948)
- Known for: Recognition of isozymes
- Spouse: Margaret Rempfer (m. 1940)
- Children: Alan, Robert, Samantha
- Scientific career
- Fields: Biochemistry, genetics
- Workplaces: Caltech, University of Michigan, Johns Hopkins University, Yale, North Carolina State University
- Military career
- Allegiance: Spanish Republic; United States
- Branch: International Brigades; United States Merchant Marine
- Service years: 1938 c. 1941–1945
- Rank: Corporal; Warrant Officer
- Unit: The "Abraham Lincoln" XV International Brigade
- Conflicts: Spanish Civil War; Battle of the Ebro; La Retirada; World War II; Pacific Ocean; Indian Ocean

Clement Lawrence Markert (April 11, 1917 – October 1, 1999) was an American biologist credited with the discovery of isozymes (different forms of enzymes that catalyze the same reaction). He was a member of the National Academy of Sciences and American Academy of Arts and Sciences, and served as president of several biology societies.

== Biography ==
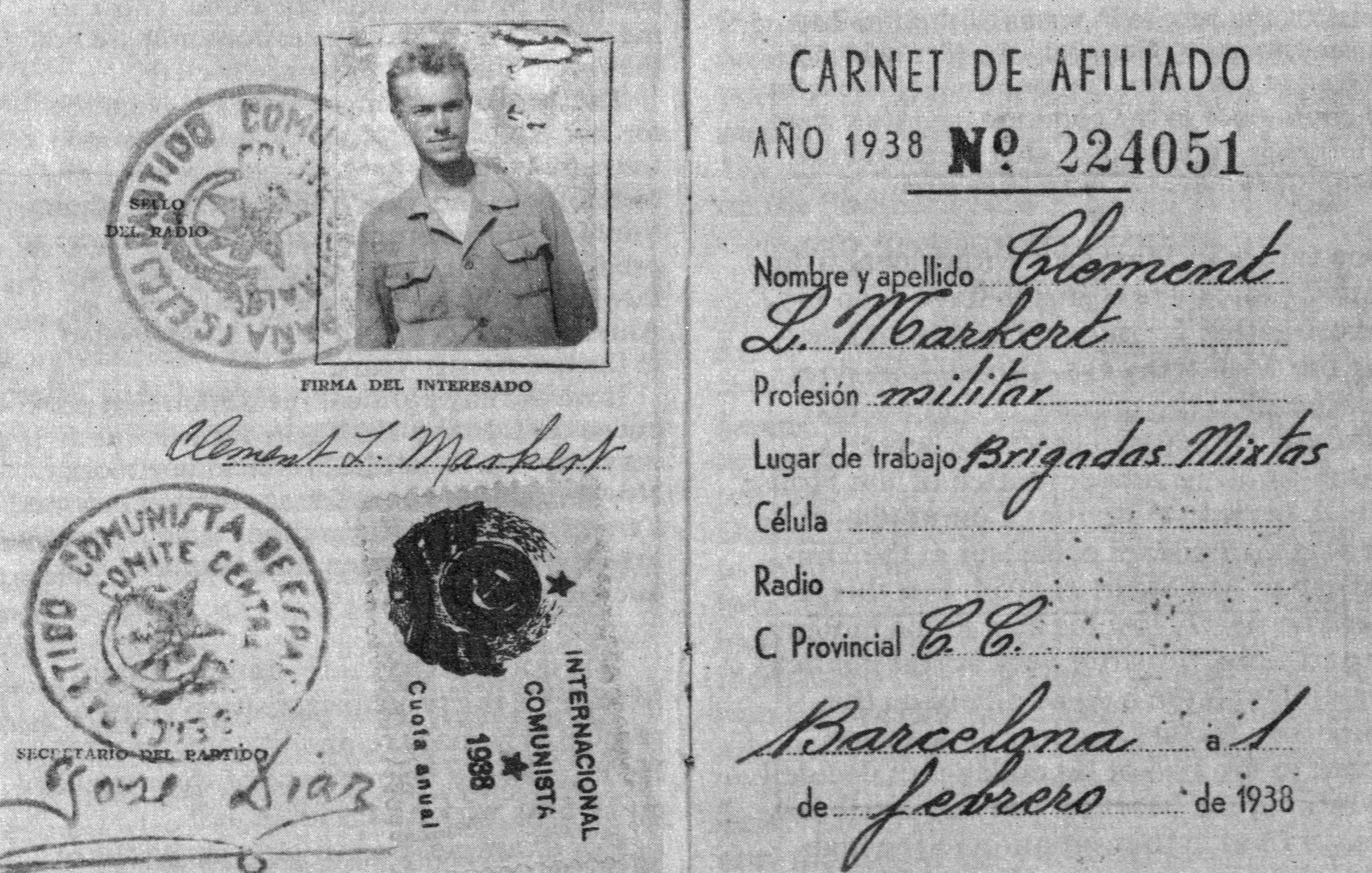
Markert's PCE membership card, February 1938

Markert was born in Las Animas, Colorado and raised in Pueblo, Colorado. He attended the University of Colorado, joined the Young Communist League in 1937, and left college to fight in the Spanish Civil War in 1938—stowing away aboard a freighter to circumvent government travel restrictions. After returning to college, Markert completed his bachelor's degree in 1940; upon graduation, he married Margaret Rempfer, and they moved to UCLA for graduate work. He enrolled in the United States Merchant Marine to take part in World War II; by 1954 they had three children. After the war, he finished a master's degree at UCLA followed by a Ph.D. from Johns Hopkins University in 1948.

Markert's Ph.D. research, and subsequent postdoctoral work at Caltech, focused on the sexuality and other physiological and genetic aspects of Glomerella, a genus of pathogenic plant fungi. At Caltech, he also worked with George Beadle on corn and Neurospora genetics.

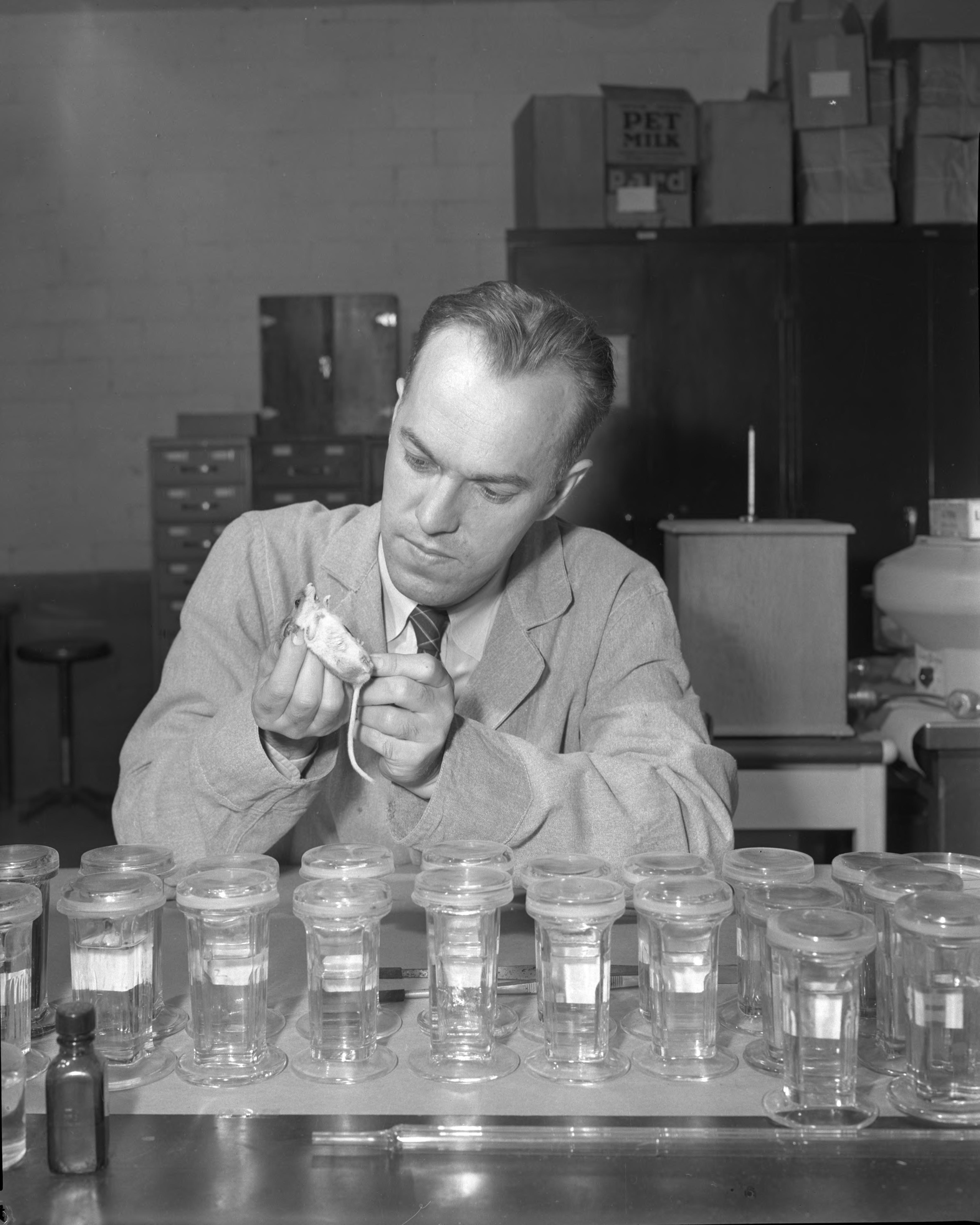
Clement Markert in the lab, 1951

In 1950 he began teaching at the University of Michigan, part of the new wave of what later became molecular biology. In 1954, Markert became a victim of McCarthyism; he was suspended from teaching because he refused to testify before the House Un-American Activities Committee. He was later reinstated, and continued at the University of Michigan until moving to Johns Hopkins in 1957, followed by Yale University—as head of the Department of Biology. In 1966, he served as president of the American Institute of Biological Sciences. He remained at Yale until retiring in 1986 to North Carolina State University, where he continued researching until 1993.

Early in his career, Markert developed the concept of isozymes based on electrophoresis and histochemical staining of enzymes. He found that often what had been assumed to be a single enzyme catalyzing a specific reaction was in fact multiple enzymes, with different proteins present in different tissues. In biochemistry, this forced a re-evaluation of some basic assumptions of enzyme kinetics; in genetics, it contributed to the shift from the "one gene-one enzyme hypothesis" to the "one gene-one polypeptide" concept. Markert's early work with isozymes, many of which are formed by gene duplication, was a precursor to the concept of gene families. Markert's later career focused on developmental biology, particularly developmental genetics in experiments with mosaic animals.

Markert was Editor-in-Chief of the Journal of Experimental Zoology from 1963 to 1985. He also edited the Journal of Developmental Biology.

In 1990, the University of Michigan created the annual "Davis, Markert, Nickerson Lecture on Academic and Intellectual Freedom" series, in honor of Markert and two other Michigan faculty suspended for refusing to testify in 1954.

In 1992, it was reported in National Geographic that Markert was attempting an experiment to create a "superpig" by crossbreeding the extremely fertile Meishan pig with domestic pigs, speeding up the process by altering the genes of fertilized embryos. It was hoped that this would, within 5 years of beginning the program, create a hybrid that combined the fertility and early sexual maturation of the Meishan pig with the lean physique and quick growing times of domestic pigs.

In 1999, Markert was awarded the Edwin G. Conklin Medal from the Society for Developmental Biology.
