= Hamburger–Hamilton stages =

Model describing chick development

In developmental biology, the Hamburger–Hamilton stages (HH) are a series of 46 chronological stages in chick development, starting from laying of the egg and ending with a newly hatched chick. It is named for its creators, Viktor Hamburger and Howard L. Hamilton.

Chicken embryos are a useful model organism in experimental embryology for a number of reasons. Their domestication as poultry makes them more readily available than other vertebrates (such as mice), and being oviparous, the embryos are easily accessible. However, the rate of development can be affected by a range of factors; including the specific breed, the temperature of incubation, the delay between laying and incubation, and the time of year, raising the need to create a standardised system based on morphology rather than chronological age.

There had been a previous attempt to create a morphological system for staging chick development by the German embryologists Keibel and Abraham in 1900, but this system lacked detail and was not widely used, with most researchers relying on somite number or age to identify the stage of development. Hamburger and Hamilton aimed to provide a detailed description of developmental events, modeled on an earlier system for Axolotl by Harrison.

The Hamburger–Hamilton system provides advantages over the Carnegie system in that it allows the developing chick to be accurately characterized during all embryonic stages, and is used universally in chick embryology.

== Stages of development ==
Chick embryos can be "staged" according to the different morphological landmarks. Although most organ systems have a stereotypical appearance at each stage, there are a few which particularly lend themselves to use in staging chick development.

- In the very early embryo, the primitive streak is the only visible landmark, and its shape and size are used to stage HH1-6 embryos.
- The nervous system is formed by a process of neurulation. Stages 5–8 may be defined by the formation of a head fold, the neural folds, and their fusion to form the neural tube. The expansion of the anterior neural tube to form the brain may also be used to identify later stages.
- Somitogenesis – the progressive segmentation of the paraxial mesoderm provides a convenient method for staging embryos between stages 6 and 14. Somites form with regularity every 90 minutes. Stage 10 embryos have 10 somites, and as a rule of thumb, the embryo gains 3 somites during each stage (i.e. Stage 11 embryos have 13 somites, Stage 12 embryos have 16, etc.). However, beyond 22 somites (HH14) it is better to rely on other markers.
- Formation of the branchial arches; which will give rise to the structures of the jaw, pharynx and larynx; begins at HH14 and is used as a marker throughout development.
- The morphology of the limbs, starting with the appearance of wing bud at stage 16, is a useful landmark for staging chick embryos until hatching. Between stages 15 and 35, the appearance of specific structures within the limbs (such as joints and digits); at later stages the length of the toes are used.
- The formation and development of the eyelids, primordial feathers and beak is used in a similar way to stage later development.
