= Nicole Marthe Le Douarin =

French biologist (born 1930)

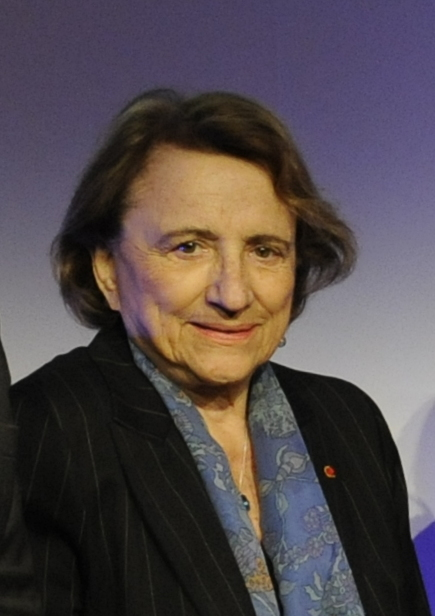
- Le Douarin in 2013
- Born: 20 August 1930 (age 96); Lorient, France
- Occupation: Developmental biologist
- Known for: Chimeras
- Awards: Kyoto Prize (1986); Louis-Jeantet Prize for Medicine (1990); Louisa Gross Horwitz Prize (1993)

Nicole Marthe Le Douarin (born 20 August 1930) is a developmental biologist known for her studies of chimeras, which have led to critical insights regarding animal nervous and immune systems.

Le Douarin invented an embryo manipulation technology to produce chimeric embryos, from chicken and quails. Her research has shed light on the development of higher animal nervous and immune systems. She showed that precursor cells within the neural crest were multipotent. Her technique has also permitted her to shed light on the development of the blood and immune systems. Her work on antero-posterior patterning of the vertebrate digestive tract laid the grounds for future work, leading to a better understanding of antero-posterior patterning in the digestive tract.

== Early years and education ==
Le Douarin was born on 20 August 1930 in Lorient, France. She was an only child, raised by both parents in the town of Lorient, where her mother worked as a schoolteacher and her father as a businessman. In 1944 she fled her hometown temporarilyand attended a boarding school in Nantes to escape the invading German forces, before moving back after the end of World War II to her high school in Lorient. She graduated in 1949. In high school and in her first year at university she was oriented towards literature but the influence of a talented science teacher in her last year at school turned her interests to natural sciences. She met her future husband while in high school and they both moved to Paris where they attended the same university and married in 1951. She received her B.S. in natural sciences from the Sorbonne in 1954. She did not immediately continue to graduate work, choosing instead to teach high school science and raise her two daughters. In 1958, she returned to the university to continue her education at the Institut d’Embryologie Centre national de la recherche scientifique (CNRS), working with renowned embryologist Etienne Wolf. This research led to her doctoral work and Ph.D. in 1964.

== Career ==
She was appointed to the faculty at the University of Nantes in 1966. The dean, however, almost disallowed her appointment because he disapproved of married women on the same faculty with their husbands. Le Douarin's mentor Wolf intervened, and the dean relented. However, she was not given laboratory space or a research budget, as her husband was, and she was given a heavy teaching load. Le Douarin continued her research on avian embryos, focusing on the interactions between the endoderm and mesoderm layers.

Le Douarin was most interested in researching embryonic inductive signaling mechanisms. Through years of experimentation, she invented an embryo manipulation technology to produce chimeric embryos from chicken and quails. When grafting quail mesoderm and chicken endoderm together, Le Douarin noticed that the quail cell nucleoli were significantly larger and denser than the chicken cell nucleoli. The size disparity was caused by the tendency of quail embryos to carry increased amount of heterochromatin in the nucleolus. Le Douarin was able to utilize Feulgen stain to stain the heterochromatin and distinguish between groups of quail-derived and chicken-derived cells in her chimeric embryos based on the amount of visible dye. The use of Feulgen stain was an important turning point in Le Douarin's research, as she was now able to track specific quail cell fates in the developing embryo. When creating embryos of combined quail and chick cells, she could trace the differentiation of separate cell lines throughout the developing organism.

Le Douarin's work on chimeric embryos became increasingly notable, and she was able to gain international funding for her research after being appointed as Director of the C.N.R.S. Institute of Embryology. Building on her past experimentation, she began to research the developmental mechanism of the neural crest of avian embryos. In a 1980 publication, Le Douarin detailed her process of inserting totipotent quail nerve cells into the neural primordium of a chick. Her Feulgen stain technique allowed for the creation of a fate map detailing the migration of the quail-derived neural crest cells. This research spurred Le Douarin to publish her first book, The Neural Crest, in 1982. In the following years, she would gain membership to the French Academy of Science, and receive the Kyoto Prize in Advanced Technology for her work with avian chimeras. Throughout the late 1980s and early 1990s, Le Douarin would be admitted to multiple highly regarded scientific societies and received many additional awards in her field, including the Louis-Jeantet Prize for Medicine, the Louisa Gross Horwitz Prize, and the Pearl Meister Greengard Prize.

Le Douarin was Director of the Institute of Embryology at the C.N.R.S., replacing her mentor Etienne Wolf. James Ebert, an embryologist at the Carnegie Institution of Washington, recommended her to the position. She is notable for her work on the development of higher animal nervous and immune systems, mechanisms of evolution in developmental biology and vertebrate central nervous system development. Her work has been used in research on songbird behavior.

== Significant papers ==
- Le Douarin N & Teillet M. "Experimental analysis of the migration and differentiation of neuroblasts of the autonomic nervous system and of neuroectodermal mesenchymal derivatives using a biological cell marking technique." Dev. Biol. v. 41, pp. 162–184 (1974).
- "Tracing of Cells of the Avian Thymus through Embryonic Life in Interspecific Chimaeras" (1975)
- "The Neural Crest" (1982)
- "Mapping of the Early Neural Primordium in Quail-Chick Chimaeras: I. Developmental Relationship between Placodes, Facial Ectoderm and Proscephalon" (1985)
- "Post-natal Development of a Demyelinating Disease in Avian Spinal Cord Chimaeras" (1986)
- "Cell line segregation during peripheral nervous system ontogeny" Science (1986)
- N. M. Le Douarin, S. Creuzet, G. Couly, and E. Dupin, Neural crest cell plasticity and its limits, Development 131, 4637-4650 (2004).

== Awards ==
- Prix de l'Académie des Sciences (1965)
- Member, European Molecular Biology Organization (1977)
- Member, Legion d'Honneur (1980)
- Member, French Academy of Sciences (1982)
- Member, American Academy of Arts and Sciences (1984)
- Honorary member, American Association for Anatomy (1984)
- Kyoto Prize in Biotechnology and Medical Technology (1986)
- CNRS Gold Medal (1986)
- Member, Collège de France (Le Douarin was only the third woman admitted in its history)
- Fellow, The Royal Society (1989)
- Louis-Jeantet Prize for Medicine (1990)
- Honorary Fellow, The Royal College of Pathologists (1993)
- Louisa Gross Horwitz Prize from Columbia University (1993)
- Ross Harrison Prize from International Society of Developmental Biologists (1997)
- Member, Pontifical Academy of Sciences (3 September 1999)
- Honorary Fellow, Academy of Medical Sciences in Great Britain (2002)
- Member, Brazilian Academy of Sciences (2002)
- Pearl Meister Greengard Prize (2004) (inaugural winner of the Prize)
- Edwin G. Conklin Medal from the Society for Developmental Biology (2005)
