= Masatoshi Takeichi =

Japanese biologist

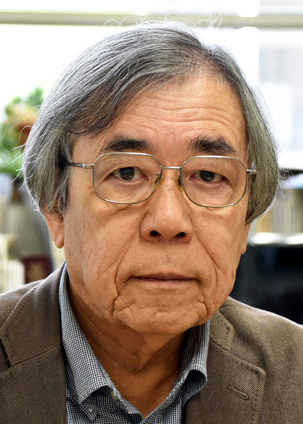
- Education: Nagoya University
- Known for: Cadherin
- Awards: Ross Harrison Prize (2001); Japan Prize (2005); Canada Gairdner International Award (2020)
- Scientific career
- Fields: Cell biology
- Workplaces: RIKEN; Kyoto University

Masatoshi Takeichi (竹市 雅俊, Takeichi Masatoshi, born November 27, 1943) is a Japanese cell biologist known for his identification of the cadherin class of adhesion molecules, which plays important roles in the construction of tissues. He shared the 2005 Japan Prize with Erkki Ruoslahti for "fundamental contribution in elucidating the molecular mechanisms of cell adhesion".

He was selected as a Member of the Japan Academy (MJA) in 2000 and as a Foreign Associate of the United States National Academy of Sciences.

== Early life and education ==
Takeichi was born in Aichi Prefecture, Japan, on November 27, 1943. He received his BSc in 1966 and MSc in 1968 from Nagoya University, and his Ph.D. in Biophysics from Kyoto University in 1973.

== Academic career ==
In 1970 Takeichi became a member of the faculty of Kyoto University, and he served as Professor of Biophysics from 1986 to 2002. During his time at Kyoto, he studied abroad at the Carnegie Institute Department of Embryology for a fellowship. In 2000, he was appointed as Director of the RIKEN Center for Developmental Biology (RIKEN CDB).

== Research contributions ==
In 1977 Takeichi discovered cadherin, and since then he has contributed to clarify its functions in tissue construction and to understand the molecular mechanisms of cell adhesion. After his discovery of cadherins, he continued to research cadherins and their properties. Along with cadherins, he also researched cell junctions and adhesions. He continues to research at RIKEN today.

=== Discovery of the Cadherin Family ===
While first working in Kyoto, Takeichi was using trypsin to study cell adhesions and aggregation. Once he moved to the Carnegie Institution, he realized the trypsin he was using behaved differently. This trypsin solution contained EDTA, along with the trypsin, which disturbed adhesion. The EDTA sequesters calcium ions, so Takeichi began testing for adhesion dependent on calcium. He used Chinese Hamster V79 cells and treated them with a variety of treatments, including EDTA, trypsin + EDTA, and trypsin + calcium. Once treated, these cells were tested for aggregation levels. He found that both calcium dependent and calcium independent pathways existed, and that the calcium treatment prevent trypsin's effects on the cell.

Takeichi knew there was calcium dependent molecule that served an important role, but he had to find it. Rolf Kemler's anti serum was what helped him finally identify cadherin. E-cadherin was the first of the cadherin family to be discovered. During this research, Takeichi also observed changes in the morphology of the cells involved with adhesions. He accurately hypothesized that the adhesions dependent on calcium played a role in managing cells' morphogenetic behavior. His discovery of the cadherin family led to a developing field of studying adhesions pathways.

=== Other contributions ===
Takeichi, along with other scientists, studied the mechanism behind hemagglutinin from Botulism and its effect on the epithelial barrier of the intestines. They found the hemagglutinin directly interacted with the e-cadherin in the epithelial cells to disturbed cell to cell adhesion. This interaction like cell to cell adhesion is dependent on calcium ions. An assay showed the hemaglutinin interaction is specific to e-cadherin.

Outside of cadherin, Takeichi studied other molecules involved with cell adhesion and beyond. He studied alpha-catenin functions outside of their functions within cell adhesion. The results showed alpha-catenin have a variety of functions outside of cadherin and adhesion. It regulates multiple different molecules, like actin and RhoGEF.

== Recognition ==
- 1992 Chunichi Culture Award
- 1994 Asahi Prize
- 1996 Japan Academy Prize
- 2001 Ross Harrison Prize, International Society of Developmental Biologists
- 2001 Keio Medical Science Prize
- 2004 Person of Cultural Merit
- 2005 Japan Prize
- 2012 Thomson Reuters Citation Laureates
- 2014 American Association for the Advancement of Science Fellow
- 2020 Canada Gairdner International Award.
- 2021 Asian Scientist 100, Asian Scientist

== Selected papers ==
- Takeichi, M (1977). "Functional correlation between cell adhesive properties and some cell surface proteins". J. Cell Biol. 75 (2): 464–474. doi:10.1083/jcb.75.2.464. PMC 2109947. PMID 264120.
- Yoshida, N.; Takeichi, M. (1982). "Teratocarcinoma cell adhesion: Identification of a cell surface protein involved in calcium-dependent cell aggregation". Cell. 28 (2): 217–224. doi:10.1016/0092-8674(82)90339-7. PMID 7060128. S2CID 44294728.
- Hatta, K.; Takeichi, M. (1986). "Expression of N-cadherin adhesion molecules associated with early morphogenetic events in chicken embryos". Nature. 320 (6061): 447–449. doi:10.1038/320447a0. PMID 3515198. S2CID 4303823.
- Nagafuchi, A.; Shirayoshi, Y.; Okazaki, K.; Yasuda, K.; Takeichi, M. (1987). "Transformation of cell adhesion properties by exogenously introduced E-cadherin cDNA". Nature. 329 (6137): 341–343. Bibcode:1987Natur.329..341N. doi:10.1038/329341a0. PMID 3498123. S2CID 4351234.
- Hirano, S.; Kimoto, N.; Shimoyama, Y.; Hirohashi, S.; Takeichi, M. (1992). "Identification of a neural alpha-catenin as a key regulator of cadherin function and multicellular organization". Cell. 70 (2): 293–301. doi:10.1016/0092-8674(92)90103-j. PMID 1638632. S2CID 29963709.
