= Nucleic acid modification databases =

This page compiles a list of databases, web portals and servers containing information on nucleic acid modification. RNA modification occurs in all living organisms, and is one of the most evolutionarily conserved properties of RNAs. More than 100 different types of RNA modifications have been characterized across all living organisms. It can affect the activity, localization as well as stability of RNAs, and has been linked with human cancer and diseases.

Name	Scope				Notes	Type	Link	Ref
Name	Molecules	Cause of modification	Data origin	Addition Info?	Notes	Type	Link	Ref
RMBase	mRNA, regulatory ncRNAs (e.g. lncRNAs, miRNAs)	Natural	high-throughput sequencing (pseudo-seq, Ψ-seq, CeU-seq, Aza-IP, MeRIP-seq, m6A-seq, miCLIP, m6A-CLIP, RiboMeth-seq)	miRNA target sites, RNA-Binding Proteins (RBPs) Binding sites and disease-related SNPs		database	rna.sysu.edu.cn/rmbase/	
MODOMICS	Any RNA	Natural and synthetic	Curation	modified ribonucleosides (symbols, chemical structures, biosynthetic pathways), RNA-modifying enzymes, location of modified residues in RNA sequences		database	modomics.genesilico.pl	
RNAmods	Any RNA	Natural	Curation	modified ribonucleosides (symbols, chemical structures), distribution (type of molecule, phylogenetic domain)		database	rnamods.github.io	
DNAmod	Any DNA	Natural and synthetic	Curation from ChEBI	symbols, chemical structures		database	dnamod.hoffmanlab.org	
NAMDB	DNA and RNA	?	?	symbols, chemical structures; for some entries: location and frequency, enzymes and reactions		database	www.namdb.cn/index.php	
