= Developmental Biology (journal) =

- Discipline: Developmental biology
- Language: English
- Edited by: Ondine Cleaver

Publication details
- History: 1959-present
- Publisher: Elsevier
- Frequency: Biweekly
- Open access: Delayed, after 12 months
- Impact factor: 3.582 (2020)

Standard abbreviations
- ISO 4: Dev. Biol.

Indexing
- CODEN: DEBIAO
- ISSN: 0012-1606 (print); 1095-564X (web)
- LCCN: a61000440
- OCLC no.: 01718504

Links
- Journal homepage; Online access

Developmental Biology is a peer-reviewed scientific journal. It was established in 1959 and is the official journal of the Society for Developmental Biology. It publishes research on the mechanisms of development, differentiation, and growth in animals and plants at the molecular, cellular, and genetic levels. The journal is published twice a month by Elsevier.

== Abstracting and indexing ==
The journal is abstracted an indexed in:

- BIOBASE
- Biological & Agricultural Index
- Biological Abstracts
- BIOSIS Previews
- Chemical Abstracts
- Current Awareness in Biological Sciences
- Current Contents
- Elsevier BIOBASE
- EMBASE
- EMBiology
- Genetics Abstracts
- MEDLINE
- Science Citation Index
- Scopus

According to the Journal Citation Reports, the journal has a 2020 impact factor of 3.582. Looking at Scimago Journal & Country Rank data trends, citations per document declined substantially between 1999 and 2020, while the number of uncited documents increased over the same period. The number of citable documents per year published has decreased from a high of around 1,650 in 2008 to 661 in 2021.
