= International Society of Developmental Biologists =

The International Society of Developmental Biologists (ISDB), formerly the Institut Internationale d'Embryologie (IIE), is a non-profit scientific association promoting developmental biology. The society holds an international Congress every four years, and awards the most prestigious award in the field of developmental biology—the Ross Harrison Prize.

The institute was founded by A. A. W. Hubrecht in 1911 as "a selective society of embryologists who would meet and discuss aspects of comparative embryology". After Hubrecht's death in 1915, the first director was Daniel de Lange; other former presidents have included Etienne Wolf, Lauri Saxén (1973–77), Edward M. De Robertis (2002–06), Masatoshi Takeichi (2007–2010) and Claudio Stern (2010). The current president is Philip Ingham.

The IIE, based out of the Hubrecht Institute (aka "Hubrecht Laboratories) in the Netherlands, changed its name in 1968 to the International Society of Developmental Biologists (ISDB). In 1997 the ISDB took over the functions of a parallel organization, the European Developmental Biology Organisation (EDBO), becoming the world umbrella of developmental biology associations. Numerous national societies are currently members of the ISDB, including the Society for Developmental Biology, the Asia-Pacific Developmental Biology Network, the Australia and New Zealand Society for Cell and Developmental Biology, the British Society of Developmental Biologists, the Finnish Society for Developmental Biology, the French Developmental Biology Society, the German Society of Developmental Biology, the Hong Kong Society for Developmental Biology, the Israel Society for Developmental Biology, the Italian Embryology Group, the Japanese Society for Developmental Biology, the Latin American Society for Developmental Biology, the Portuguese Society for Developmental Biology, and the Spanish Developmental Biology Society.

== Prizes and awards ==
In 1981, the ISDB established the Ross Harrison Prize, the leading award in the field of developmental biology. Winners have included:

- 2017 - Claudio Daniel Stern (UCL, London)
- 2013 - Janet Rossant
- 2009 - Edward M. De Robertis
- 2005 - Elliot Meyerowitz
- 2001 - Masatoshi Takeichi
- 1997 - Nicole Le Douarin
- 1993 - Pieter Nieuwkoop
- 1989 - Tokindo S. Okada
- 1985 - John Gurdon
- 1981 - Viktor Hamburger and Donald Brown

The ISDB has also established a program of "Fellows", including Abraham Mandel Schechtman (1953), Ethel Browne Harvey, and G. P. Verma (1984).

== Publications ==
- Mechanisms of Development
