= Edwin Conklin =

American biologist and zoologist (1863–1952)

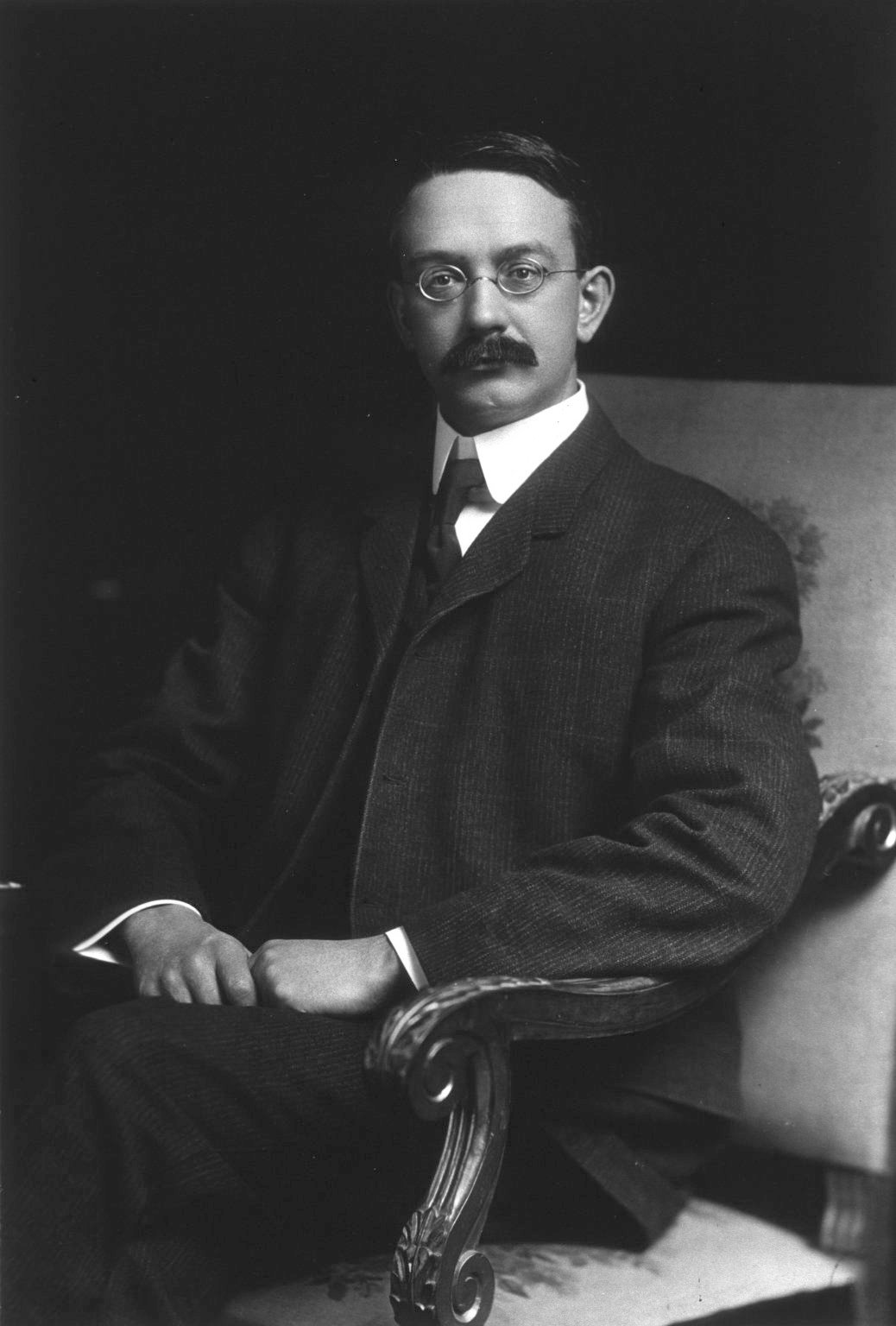
- Born: November 24, 1863; Waldo, Ohio, US
- Died: November 20, 1952 (aged 88)
- Education: Ohio Wesleyan University; Johns Hopkins University
- Awards: John J. Carty Award (1943)
- Scientific career
- Fields: Biology, zoology
- Workplaces: Ohio Wesleyan University, Northwestern University, University of Pennsylvania, Princeton University

Edwin Grant Conklin (November 24, 1863 – November 20, 1952) was an American biologist and zoologist.

== Life ==
He was born in Waldo, Ohio, the son of A. V. Conklin and Maria Hull.

He was educated at Ohio Wesleyan University and Johns Hopkins University. He was professor of biology at Ohio Wesleyan (1891–94) and professor of zoology at Northwestern University (1894–96), the University of Pennsylvania (1896-1908), and Princeton University (1908-1935). He became coeditor of the Journal of Morphology, The Biological Bulletin, and the Journal of Experimental Zoology. In 1897, he was elected to the American Philosophical Society. He was elected to the United States National Academy of Sciences in 1908. He was president of the American Society of Naturalists in 1912, became a member of the American Academy of Arts and Sciences in 1914, and was president of the American Association for the Advancement of Science in 1936. He was elected a Fellow of the American Academy of Arts and Sciences in 1914. He also served on the board of trustees for Science Service, now known as Society for Science and the Public, from 1937 to 1952. In 1943, Conklin was awarded the John J. Carty Award from the National Academy of Sciences.

In 1995, the Society for Developmental Biology inaugurated the Edwin Grant Conklin Medal in his honor.

== Family ==
He married Belle Adkinson in 1889.
