= William McGinnis =

American molecular biologist and academic

- Education: UC Berkeley
- Scientific career
- Institutions: University of California San Diego; Yale University

William McGinnis is an American molecular biologist who is a professor of biology at the University of California San Diego. At UC San Diego he has also served as the Chairman of the Department of Biology from July 1998 to June 1999, as Associate Dean of the Division of Natural Sciences from July 1, 1999 to June 2000, and as Interim Dean of the newly established Division of Biological Sciences from July 1, 2000 to February 1, 2001. McGinnis was appointed Dean of the Divisional Biological Sciences on July 1, 2013.

He received his Ph.D. from UC Berkeley in 1982 and was a Jane Coffin Childs postdoctoral fellow at the University of Basel. From 1984 to 1995, he was on the faculty of Yale University. He received a Searle Scholar Award, a Presidential Young Investigator Award, and a Dreyfuss Teacher/Scholar Award. McGinnis was elected to the American Academy of Arts and Sciences in 2010, and the National Academy of Sciences in 2019.

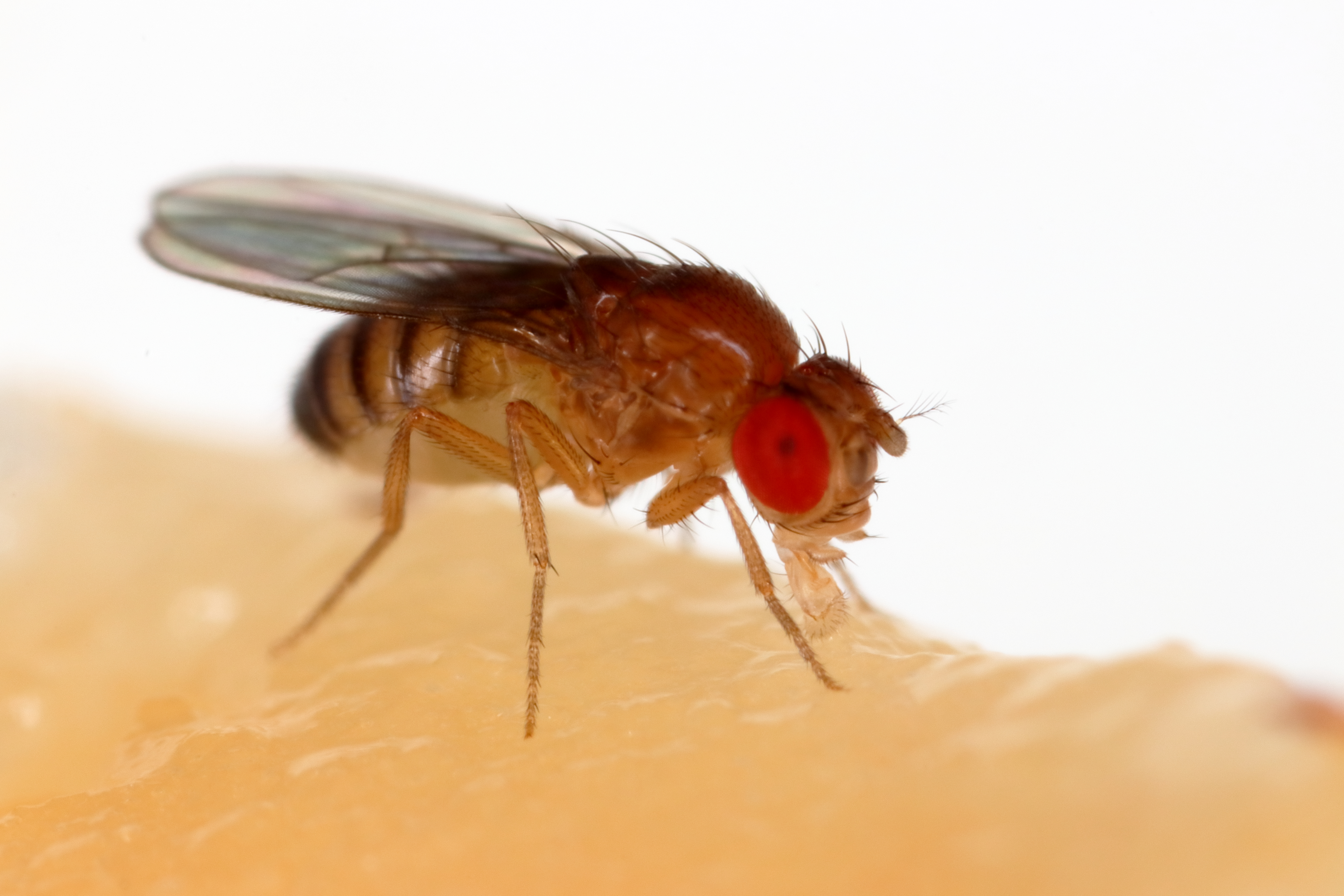
Drosophila Melanogaster, the object of McGinnissues' science

== Research ==
McGinnis studies the evolutionary changes in transcription factors by looking at the Hox genes. His main research has been in Drosophila, comparing Hox genes within that species with Hox genes in other species, to see they are conserved (kept intact) during evolution. He also studies how Hox transcription functions control morphogenesis, and how changes in the Hox proteins, cofactors, and DNA targets affect morphology. One long-term objective of the research in his lab is to understand the molecular interactions that underlie functional specificity in the Hox patterning system.

McGinnis is notable for his co-discovery of homeobox, with Michael S. Levine. But importantly, for the discovery that Hox (homeobox) genes were found in vertebrates and a wide variety of animals, conserved, and were expressed in different regions of the vertebrate embryonic body axis, and that mammal Hox genes could function as anterior-posterior embryonic regulators of body axis specification, in flies as well as mammals. That is, Hox gene functions were similar in controlling body axis patterning in both flies and other more complicated animals, such as mammals.

=== Articles ===
- McGinnis, William; Michael Kuziora (February 1994). "The Molecular Architects of Body Design". Scientific American. 270 (2): 36–42. Bibcode:1994SciAm.270b..58M. doi:10.1038/scientificamerican0294-58. PMID 7906436.
