= Henry Jay Forman =

American scientist

Henry Jay Forman is an American scientist. He is a Distinguished Professor Emeritus of Biochemistry at the University of California, Merced. and Research Professor Emeritus of Gerontology at the University of Southern California (USC) Leonard Davis School of Gerontology. He is a specialist in free radical biology and chemistry, antioxidant defense, and pioneered work in redox signaling including the mechanisms of induced resistance to oxidative stress.

== Biography ==
He received his degrees from Queens College of the City University of New York and Columbia University. After holding a Post-Doctoral position at Duke University, he held faculty positions in biochemistry, physiology, molecular pharmacology, toxicology, pediatrics, and pathology. He was previously a faculty member at the University of Pennsylvania, the USC School of Medicine and the USC School of Pharmacy and then moved to the University of Alabama, Birmingham, School of Public Health, where he was the Chairman of Environmental Health Sciences. He was one of the founding faculty at the University of California, Merced.

== Career ==
Forman has focused almost his entire career on redox (free radical) biology and chemistry He has worked on the biological generation and defense against oxidants and on the cellular use of oxidants as physiologically important signals. His work contains over 240 publications. His major current research focuses on understanding how aging causes increased susceptibility to air pollution.

He is the Past President of the Society for Free Radical Biology and Medicine and Past Executive Editor of Archives of Biochemistry and Biophysics. He served as the Governor’s appointed scientist on the San Joaquin Valley Air Pollution Control District Governing Board. He is a Fellow of the Society of Free Radical Biology and Medicine (now Society for Redox Biology and Medicine).

Forman was the recipient of the Society for Free Radical Research - Europe Award Lectureship, the Lifetime Achievement Award from the Society for Redox Biology and Medicine and the Trevor Slater Award from the International Society for Free Radical Research. He has served on the Scientific Policy Committee of the American Physiological Society.
