= Alan Garen =

American geneticist (1926–2022)

- Born: March 26, 1926
- Died: April 20, 2022 (aged 96); New Haven, Connecticut, U.S.
- Education: University of Colorado
- Known for: Discovery of stop codons
- Scientific career
- Fields: Genetics
- Workplaces: Yale University
- Doctoral advisor: Theodore T. Puck

Alan Garen was an American geneticist who co-discovered suppressor mutations for tRNA. The Garen lab also showed that certain triplet codons (5'-UAG, 5'-UAA, and 5'-UGA) failed to bind amino acids. Thus, the Garen lab and Brenner labs are both credited with discovery of the stop codons of the genetic code.

Garen was a professor at Yale University between 1963 and 2021. He was a member of the National Academy of Sciences and the American Academy of Arts and Sciences.
