= Genetics Abstracts =

Genetics database

Genetics Abstracts is a database produced by CSA Illumina. It includes abstracts from articles from 954 peer-reviewed scientific journals in the field of genetics published since 1982. The database is updated monthly, with approximately 1600 new records added. As of October 2009, it contains over 535,623 records.
