= Society for Developmental Biology =

International organization

The Society for Developmental Biology (SDB), originally the Society for the Study of Development and Growth, is an organization for scientists and professionals around the world whose research is focused on the study of the developmental biology, embryology, and related disciplines.

== History ==
The "Society for the Study of Development and Growth" (SDB) was founded in 1939. In August 1939, the SDB held its first conference, a symposium on Developmental and Growth, in a small village schoolhouse in North Truro, Massachusetts. In 1965, it was renamed the "Society for Developmental Biology" to reflect the SDB's advocacy of developmental biology.

== Mission ==
The Society for Developmental Biology's mission is to employ, "... an inclusive philosophy to further the study of developmental biology and related disciplines; to foster, support, and provide a forum for all investigators in these fields; to educate non-specialists, educators, the general public, and policymakers about developmental biology and related disciplines; and to promote fair, respectful, ethical and equitable practices throughout the scientific enterprise."

== Membership ==
SDB has more than 2,000 members and provides an international forum for research, education, and career development in developmental biology. Membership is open to all with discounted rates for students, postdoctoral researchers, and affiliates. SDB Emerging Research Organisms Grant supports the development of techniques, approaches, community resources, collaborations, and new lines of research to study developmental mechanisms in non-traditional systems.

== Awards ==
SDB Career Awards recognize excellence in research, mentoring, education, and science communication in the developmental biology community.

- Edwin Grant Conklin Medal recognizes extraordinary mentorship and research contributions to the field. The award was inaugurated in 1995 to honor the biologist Edwin Conklin.
- Developmental Biology-SDB Lifetime Achievement Award, which began in 2000, recognizes outstanding and sustained contributions to the field through research, service to the scientific community, exceptional mentorship, and public advocacy.
- Viktor Hamburger Outstanding Educator Prize recognizes innovative contributions to the teaching and learning of developmental biology and related fields.
- Elizabeth D. Hay New Investigator Award recognizes a new investigator performing outstanding research in developmental biology.
- SDB Trainee Science Communication Award recognizes great science communication and outreach efforts by the student and postdoctoral members.
- SDB Academy, established in 2023, recognizes and celebrates the achievements of long-standing members who have made significant contributions to the Society’s overarching goals while positively engaging with the Society.

== Professional and Career Development ==
SDB has made a concerted effort to diversify the pool of scientists by creating resources and professional development opportunities. In 2013, SDB created the Choose Development! Program—a two-summer immersion for undergraduate students belonging to underrepresented groups in STEM to join the research laboratory of an established SDB member. This research-intensive experience was enhanced by a multi-tier mentoring program for each student, recognition across Society, professional development activities, and networking opportunities at national conferences.

The Society began creating virtual career development programs geared toward early career scientists. Since 2020, SDB has developed the Ethel Browne Harvey Postdoctoral Seminar Series, Science Communication Internship, Get Into Grad School Webinar, Get Hired!, and New Faculty Boot Camp.

== Publication ==
SDB publishes in a monthly peer reviewed journal, Developmental Biology.
