= Christiana Ruhrberg =

German-British cell biologist

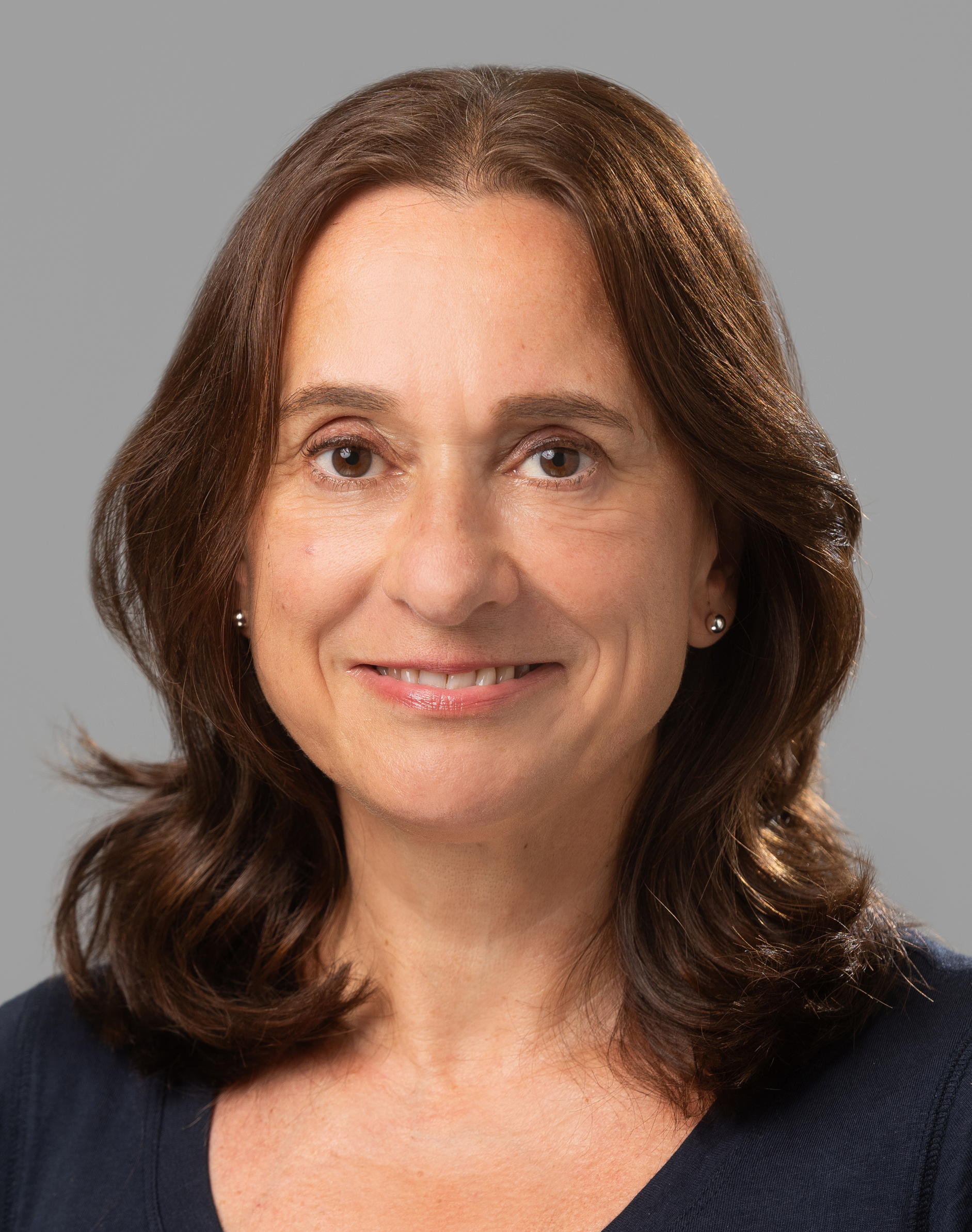
- Scientific career
- Workplaces: University College London
- Thesis: Envoplakin and periplakin, novel components of the cornified envelope and desmosomes. (1997)
- Doctoral advisor: Fiona Watt

Christiana Ruhrberg is a German-British cell biologist who is Professor of Neuronal and Vascular Biology. University College London She investigates how cells interact during the development of mammals and examines how similar interactions influence the repair and regeneration of adult organs.

== Early life and education ==
Ruhrberg was an undergraduate student at the Justus-Liebig-Universitaet, where she majored in biology. She was a Master's student at the University of Sussex, where she investigated genetic changes in ovarian cancer. Ruhrberg moved to the Imperial Cancer Research Fund to define the genomic organisation in the human surfeit locus. Ruhrberg was a doctoral researcher at the Imperial Cancer Research Fund, where she worked under the supervision of Fiona Watt. In 1986, the British Society for Cell Biology named her Young Cell Biologist of the Year. She received her PhD from Imperial College London in 1997. Ruhrberg was a postdoctoral researcher at the National Institute for Health Research, where she worked under the supervision of Robb Krumlauf to study the development of cranial motor neurons. She returned to the Imperial Cancer Research Fund to work in the laboratory of David Shima, where she investigated molecular mechanisms that underpin the growth of blood vessels.

== Research and career ==
Ruhrberg moved to University College London in 2003, and was promoted to Professor of Neuronal and Vascular Development at UCL in 2011. Here, she has combined her training in neuronal and vascular development to help establish the field of neurovascular co-patterning. She also studies how blood vessels grow in the brain and retina (see selected references).

== Awards and honours ==
- 2003 Werner-Risau-Prize
- 2003 Medical Research Council Career Development Award
- 2018 British Society for Developmental Biology Cheryll Tickle Medal
- 2018 North American Vascular Biology Organization Judah Folkman Award in Vascular Biology

== Selected publications ==
- Gerhardt, Holger; Gerhardt, Holger; Matthew Golding; et al. (2003). "VEGF guides angiogenic sprouting utilizing endothelial tip cell filopodia". Journal of Cell Biology. 161 (6): 1163–1177. doi:10.1083/jcb.200302047. PMC 2172999. PMID 12810700. Wikidata Q29617501.
- Christiana Ruhrberg; Gerhardt, Holger; Gerhardt, Holger; et al. (2002). "Spatially restricted patterning cues provided by heparin-binding VEGF-A control blood vessel branching morphogenesis". Genes & Development. 16 (20): 2684–2698. doi:10.1101/gad.242002. PMC 187458. PMID 12381667. Wikidata Q35804497.
- Fantin, Alessandro; Joaquim M Vieira; Gaia Gestri; et al. (2010). "Tissue macrophages act as cellular chaperones for vascular anastomosis downstream of VEGF-mediated endothelial tip cell induction". Blood. 116 (5): 829–840. doi:10.1182/blood-2009-12-257832. PMC 2938310. PMID 20404134. Wikidata Q30496577.
