= Cheryll Tickle =

British scientist

Cheryll Tickle CBE FRS FRSE FMedSci
- Born: Cheryll Anne Tickle; 18 January 1945 (age 81)
- Education: University of Cambridge (MA); University of Glasgow (PhD)
- Awards: EMBO Member (2001)
- Scientific career
- Fields: Developmental biology
- Workplaces: University of Bath; Yale University; Middlesex Hospital; University College London; University of Dundee
- Thesis: Quantitative studies on the positioning of cells in aggregates (1970)
- Doctoral advisor: Adam S. G. Curtis
- Website: researchportal.bath.ac.uk/en/persons/cheryll-tickle

Cheryll Anne Tickle (born 18 January 1945) is a British scientist, known for her work in developmental biology and specifically for her research into the process by which vertebrate limbs develop ab ovo. She is an emeritus professor at the University of Bath.

== Education ==
Tickle was educated at the University of Cambridge graduating with a master's degree in 1967, and received her PhD from the University of Glasgow in 1970.

== Career and research ==
Tickle worked as a postdoctoral researcher at Yale University, as a lecturer and reader at the Middlesex Hospital Medical School, and (after Middlesex merged with it in 1987) a reader and professor at University College London. She then moved to the University of Dundee in 1998, where she became Foulerton Professor of the Royal Society in 2000, and moved again to the University of Bath in 2007, retaining the Foulerton Professor title.

Tickle's research in developmental biology investigates how single cells, the fertilised egg, gives rise to a new individual during embryogenesis.

As Tickle was nearing the end of her undergraduate career at the University of Cambridge, the concept of sorting-out was on the rise. Sorting-out or cell sorting is the phenomenon where cultured cells are disaggregated and then re-aggregated with the purpose of observing the reestablishment of the spatial organization of cell structures within a cell.

Following the completion of her PhD in 1970, Tickle was given a NATO fellowship where she completed a postdoc in the United States working with John Philip Trinkaus at Yale University on cell sorting in fish embryos. After two years, Tickle moved back to London where she worked with Lewis Wolpert, who had been her PhD supervisor. At this time, she decided that she was going to focus on the effects of positional or pattern information on the sorting out process of cells during the limb development of chicken embryos. Tickle’s hypothesis was that if cells of the embryonic limb were to be given distinct characteristics in a random arrangement the cells would arrange themselves into a generated pattern or “sort out”.

In 1969, a scientist named John Saunders established that the apical ectodermal ridge (AER)--a transparent rim along limb buds—plays an important role in the development or outgrowth of a limb along with the zone of polarizing activity(ZPA). Using these findings, Tickle focused her research on how the ZPA controlled the development of the limb, specifically along the anterior and posterior axis of a developing limb as this axis is controlled by the signalling of the ZPA.

It was at this time that Wolpert suggested that the ZPA produced morphogen to create a concentration gradient so that cells at varying positions along the limb bud would be exposed to different concentrations ultimately providing them with the information necessary to develop into the appropriate number of digits. In other words, he believed that the distance from the polarizing region would lead to the formation of different digits during limb development. Tickle’s experiments in his lab on embryonic chicken wings did find that the type of digit that developed did depend on its distance from the polarizing region. Cells closest to the polarizing region on the posterior side of the limb would come in contact with higher concentrations of morphogen to then form a chicken digit 4, whereas the cells furthest from the polarizing region on the anterior side of the limb would experience much lower concentrations and therefore develop the chicken digit 2. These results were important in the field of developmental biology at this time, as it suggested that this model would be a definitive way of understanding how the polarizing region or ZPA worked.

In 1976, Bruce Alberts, an American biochemist, brought the concept of using beads to further their research in the development of limbs. Together, they came up with the idea to soak the beads in extracts made from the polarizing region and then position them along the anterior margin of a developing chicken limb. There was also little known about what other chemicals were utilized during development, so the beads were soaked in many other substances thought to be significant, including insulin which was suggested to lead to duplication of limbs in ducks. In the early 1980’s, Tickle’s lab identified retinoic acid as a chemical that could mimic the signalling of the polarizing region by using carriers soaked in the retinoic acid.

By 1990, it was discovered that homologs of many developmentally important genes in vertebrates were found in Drosophila melanogaster and multiple scientists cloned chick homologs of these genes. Cheryll Tickle worked alongside Eddy De Robertis and Denis Duboule to look at Hox gene expression in developing limbs to relate it to chicken wing patterns. They found that if a limb was duplicated with retinoic acid, the pattern of Hox gene expression would also be copied.

Tickle also worked with Gail Martin and Lee Niswander in 1994 to find that fibroblast growth factors (FGF) are what is used by the apical ectodermal ridge for signalling. They also discovered that bone morphogenetic proteins (BMP) were involved in the polarizing region signalling. To test this, Tickle utilized the bead technology introduced by Bruce Alberts by using particular beads to apply various chemicals to developing limbs. When the ACR was removed and FGF soaked beads were substituted within a chick wing bud, it was found to be able to promote proper chicken wing development. This was a significant finding that led to further discovery of this concept within mice by Gail Martin on a more complex scale. A student in Tickle’s lab found that the placement of a bead soaked with FGF for only a few hours could induce the development of a new limb where one would not naturally form. It was concluded that FGF signaling must be turned off following the completion of limb development or else the organism risks additional digit formation and other abnormalities taking place.

=== Awards and honours ===
Tickle was elected a Fellow of the Royal Society (FRS) in 1998, a Fellow of the Royal Society of Edinburgh (FRSE) in 2000, a Fellow of the Academy of Medical Sciences (FMedSci) in 2001, and a member of the European Molecular Biology Organisation in 2001. In 1998 she was the inaugural winner of the Waddington Medal from the British Society for Developmental Biology, awarded for major contributions to developmental biology in the United Kingdom. In 2004 the University of St. Andrews awarded her an honorary doctorate. In 2005 she was named a Commander of The Most Excellent Order of the British Empire (CBE). She also serves as a governor of the Caledonian Research Foundation. Her nomination for the Royal Society reads:

Distinguished for her contribution to developmental biology. She demonstrated a quantitative relationship between the signal from the polarizing region in the embryo limb and the pattern digits, and that a similar signal was present in mammals. She discovered that local application of retinoic acid can mimic the signal from the polarizing region. Both these signals were shown to control homeobox gene expression. She has now shown that the signal from the apical ridge which is essential for limb development is a fibroblast growth factor. Her work is characterized by outstanding experimental skill, design and interpretation.

== Personal life ==
Tickle married John Gray in 1979.
