= Stephen Schwartz (pathologist) =

American pathologist (1942–2020)

- Died: March 17, 2020; Seattle
- Education: doctorate, Doctor of Medicine
- Alma mater: Harvard College; Boston University; University of Washington
- Awards: Earl P. Benditt Award (2001)
- Academic career
- Institutions: University of Washington (1973–2020)

Stephen M. Schwartz (January 1, 1942 – March 17, 2020) was an American pathologist at the University of Washington. He researched vascular biology, investigating the structure of blood vessels and smooth muscle cells. He died from complications brought on by COVID-19 during the early days of the COVID-19 pandemic in Seattle.

== Biography ==
Schwartz was born on New Year's Day in Boston to a Jewish family. Schwartz's father was a physician and was one of the first to treat victims of Nazi concentration camps at the end of World War II. Judaism remained a strong part of Schwartz's cultural identity throughout his life.

Schwartz received a BA in biology from Harvard University in 1963 and a Doctor of Medicine from Boston University in 1967. He started a residency at the University of Washington in 1967, but was more interested in an academic than clinical career, and obtained his Ph.D. in pathology from the institution in 1973, under the mentorship of Earl Benditt. Schwartz served briefly as the Associate Chief of Pathology at the United States Navy Medical Center from 1973 to 1974, before returning the University of Washington, where he remained for the duration of his career.

At the University of Washington, Schwartz served as an assistant professor of pathology from 1974 to 1979, an associate professor from 1979 to 1984, and ultimately a full professor starting in 1984. He was an adjunct professor in the medicine and bioengineering departments. He helped found the North American Vascular Biology Organisation, and create the Earl P. Benditt Award, which he received in 2001.

Schwartz died from COVID-19 on March 17, 2020, at the age of 78.

== Work ==
Schwartz is considered one of the founders of the field of modern vascular biology. Schwartz wrote or coauthored approximately 700 scientific publications during the span of his career, making significant contributions to the understanding of the nature and underlying causes of atherosclerosis and the vascularization of cancers.
