= Department of Physiology, Development and Neuroscience, University of Cambridge =

Department of the University of Cambridge

Department of Physiology, Development and Neuroscience (PDN)
- Affiliations: University of Cambridge
- Chairman: Sarah Bray and William Henry Colledge (joint Heads of Department)
- Location: Cambridge, United Kingdom
- Website: www.pdn.cam.ac.uk

The Department of Physiology, Development and Neuroscience, (PDN) is a part of the School of Biological Sciences at the University of Cambridge. Research in PDN focuses on three main areas: Cellular and Systems Physiology, Developmental and Reproductive Biology, and Neuroscience and is currently headed by Sarah Bray and William Colledge. The department was formed on 1 January 2006, within the School of Biological Sciences at the University of Cambridge from the merger of the Departments of Anatomy and Physiology. The department hosts the Centre for Trophoblast Research and has links with the Cambridge Centre for Brain Repair, the Cambridge Stem Cell Institute, and the Gurdon Institute.

== Senior staff in the department ==
As of 2014 the department has 25 Professors, ten of whom are Fellows of the Royal Society (FRS).

1. Horace Barlow FRS
2. Andrea Brand FRS
3. Dennis Bray
4. Sarah Bray
5. Nick Brown
6. Graham Burton
7. Roger Carpenter
8. William Henry Colledge
9. Andrew Crawford FRS
10. Abigail Fowden
11. Dino Giussani
12. Roger Hardie FRS
13. William A Harris FRS
14. Christine Holt FRS
15. Chris Huang
16. Martin Johnson FRS
17. Randall S Johnson
18. Roger Keynes
19. Jenny Morton
20. Ole Paulsen
21. Angela Roberts
22. Wolfram Schultz FRS
23. Azim Surani FRS
24. Roger C Thomas FRS
25. Magdalena Zernicka-Goetz

== History ==
Anatomy was taught within the university since its foundation in about 1231. Initially, the teaching was of a theoretical nature based on readings of the classical texts of Galen, but the subject became established as an academic discipline in the early 16th century. In 1707 the first Professor of Anatomy, George Rolfe, was appointed. The tenth Professor of Anatomy, George Humphry, appointed in 1866, was a founder of the Journal of Anatomy and Physiology, and during the early tenure of his office, anatomy and physiology were taught together.

In 1870 Michael Foster was appointed as Praelector in Physiology. In 1878, the university supplied Foster with a purpose-built laboratory on the east side of Downing Street. Though Foster's contributions to research were not enduring, he was an inspirational teacher and is the academic "great grandfather" to a large fraction of the world's current physiologists. In 1883 Foster became the first Professor of Physiology, Cambridge University.

- Edgar Adrian (1932)
- Henry Dale (1936)
- Alan Hodgkin (1963)
- Andrew Huxley (1963)
- Roger Y. Tsien (2008)
- Robert G. Edwards (2010)
