= Vivian Irish =

American biologist

- Education: Wesleyan University, Harvard University
- Known for: ABC Model
- Scientific career
- Fields: Floral development
- Workplaces: Yale University
- Doctoral advisor: Bill Gelbart
- Other academic advisors: Michael Akam, Ian Sussex

Vivian Irish is an American evolutionary biologist. She is currently Chair & Eaton Professor of Molecular, Cellular and Developmental Biology and Professor of Ecology and Evolutionary Biology at Yale University. Her research focuses on floral development. She was president of Society for Developmental Biology in 2012 and currently serves as an editor for the journals Developmental Biology and Evolution & Development.

== Personal life ==
Irish was drawn into research from a young age when visiting the Boston Science Museum. She has taught numerous undergraduate students at Yale University and focused on the importance of evidence-based thinking. She began working with Arabidopsis as it was becoming a model organism, serving as a "botanical Drosophila".

== Education ==
Irish received a B.A. from Wesleyan University and a Ph.D. in Cell and Developmental Biology from Harvard University while mentored by Bill Gelbart. Her first postdoctoral fellowship was at Cambridge University, where she studied Drosophila with Michael Akam and her second postdoctoral fellowship focused on plant development with Ian Sussex at Yale.

== Current research ==
Irish has been a faculty member at Yale since 1991. In her present position as chair of the Molecular, Cellular, and Developmental Biology department, she helped to create a degree path for a Neuroscience major in collaboration with Yale's Psychology Department. The Irish lab does work on plant development and stem cell proliferation in plants, particularly as it pertains to the formation and growth of a flower's petal. This has also included research into the morphogenesis of thorns in Citrus, which was found to be related to the rest of lateral stem cells. Irish is also a member of the Center for RNA Science and Medicine at Yale University.

Her work has been influential in the development of the ABC model of development, specifically with the genes APETALA1, APETALA3, and PISTILLA MADS-box genes. Irish is generally interested in patterns and timing of development, which she has explored through fate maps and gene expression

== Awards, prizes, and honors ==
- 2023 Elected Fellow of the American Association for the Advancement of Science
- 2019 Inducted into the Connecticut Academy of Science and Engineering
- 2013 President of the Society for Developmental Biology
- 2011 Visiting Professor at ENS in Lyon, France
- 1989 National Science Fellowship Postdoc
- 1986 Jane Coffin Childs Fellow at University of Cambridge
