= A549 =

A549 may refer to:

- A549 (cell line), a carcinomic human alveolar basal epithelial cell
- A549 road (Wales), a road in Great Britain
