= Philip Ingham =

British geneticist

Professor Philip Ingham FRS FMedSci FRSB

Head, Department of Life Sciences, University of Bath
- In office 2023–2025

Professor of Developmental Biology, Nanyang Technological University
- In office 2013–2023

Professor of Developmental Biology, Imperial College London
- In office 2013–2016

Research Director A*STAR Institute of Molecular and Cell Biology
- In office 2006–2013

Professor of Developmental Genetics, University of Sheffield
- In office 1996–2009

Principal Scientist, Imperial Cancer Research Fund
- In office 1986–1996

Personal details
- Born: Philip William Ingham; 19 March 1955 (age 71) Liverpool, England
- Occupation: Geneticist

Philip William Ingham (born 19 March 1955, Liverpool) is a British geneticist, currently the Raymond Schinazi and Family Chair of Life Sciences at the University of Bath. Previously he lived and worked in Singapore for 18 years where he was Toh Kian Chui Distinguished Professor and vice-Dean for Research at the Lee Kong Chian School of Medicine, a partnership between Nanyang Technological University, Singapore and Imperial College, London. He also served as the inaugural Director of the Living Systems Institute at the University of Exeter, UK.

== Career ==
Ingham was educated at Merchant Taylors' School, Crosby near Liverpool and then at Queens' College, Cambridge, where after initially reading Philosophy and Theology he graduated in Genetics. He gained his Doctorate of Philosophy from the University of Sussex under the supervision of J Robert S Whittle before moving to the Laboratoire de Génétique Moleculaire des Eukaryotes in Strasbourg, France, as a Royal Society European Exchange Programme fellow. He returned to the UK in 1982, joining the Imperial Cancer Research Fund (ICRF, now known as Cancer Research UK) as a post-doctoral research fellow in the laboratory of David Ish-Horowicz. After a brief spell as a Research Scientist at the MRC Laboratory of Molecular Biology in Cambridge, he re-joined the ICRF as a staff scientist, remaining there for ten years before moving to the University of Sheffield, where he established the MRC Centre for Developmental and Biomedical Genetics. He was elected a member of the European Molecular Biology Organization in 1995, a Fellow of the Academy of Medical Sciences in 2001 and Fellow of the Royal Society in 2002. In 2005, he became the second recipient of the Medal of the Genetics Society of Great Britain and in 2007 was elected an Honorary Fellow of the Royal College of Physicians. In 2014 he was awarded The Waddington Medal from the British Society for Developmental Biology, for his major contributions to developmental biology in the UK. He has served on numerous international Scientific Advisory Boards and funding committees and was President of the International Society of Developmental Biologists from 2013-2017. In 2014 he was awarded the Waddington Medal by the British Society for Developmental Biology.

== Scientific contributions ==
As a graduate student, Ingham isolated a novel homoeotic mutation in Drosophila, which he named trithorax (trx). Using genetic mosaic analysis, he showed that the trx gene is required for the maintenance of the determined state of cells, presaging the current understanding of the Trithorax-group proteins as key epigenetic regulators throughout the animal kingdom. Subsequently, he pioneered the molecular analysis of the process of segmentation in the Drosophila embryo, through the simultaneous analysis the expression of patterns of pair rule genes using the technique of in situ hybridisation. These studies led to his interest in what is now known as the Hedgehog signalling pathway; Ingham's genetic studies identified the core components of this pathway and in particular the role of the Patched protein as the receptor for the Hedgehog ligand. In 1993, in collaboration with Andy McMahon and Clifford Tabin, Ingham's research group discovered the vertebrate homologues of the Drosophila hedgehog gene, including Sonic hedgehog. This finding set in train a surge of interest in this pathway, leading amongst other things, to the recognition of its role in a number of human cancers and to the development of a novel anti-cancer drug that specifically targets the pathway. Ingham was in the vanguard of researchers to adopt the zebrafish, Danio rerio, as a model for the analysis of vertebrate development and more recently for the study of processes related to human diseases.

== Publications ==
Ingham has authored or co-authored over 180 peer-reviewed scientific primary research papers and review articles. Notable amongst the latter are his 1988 review of the Molecular Genetics of embryonic Pattern formation in Drosophila and his 2001 review, co-authored with Andrew McMahon, on the Principles and Paradigms of Hedgehog signalling.
