= Jim Cuthbert Smith =

British scientist (born 1954)

Sir Jim Smith FRS FMedSci
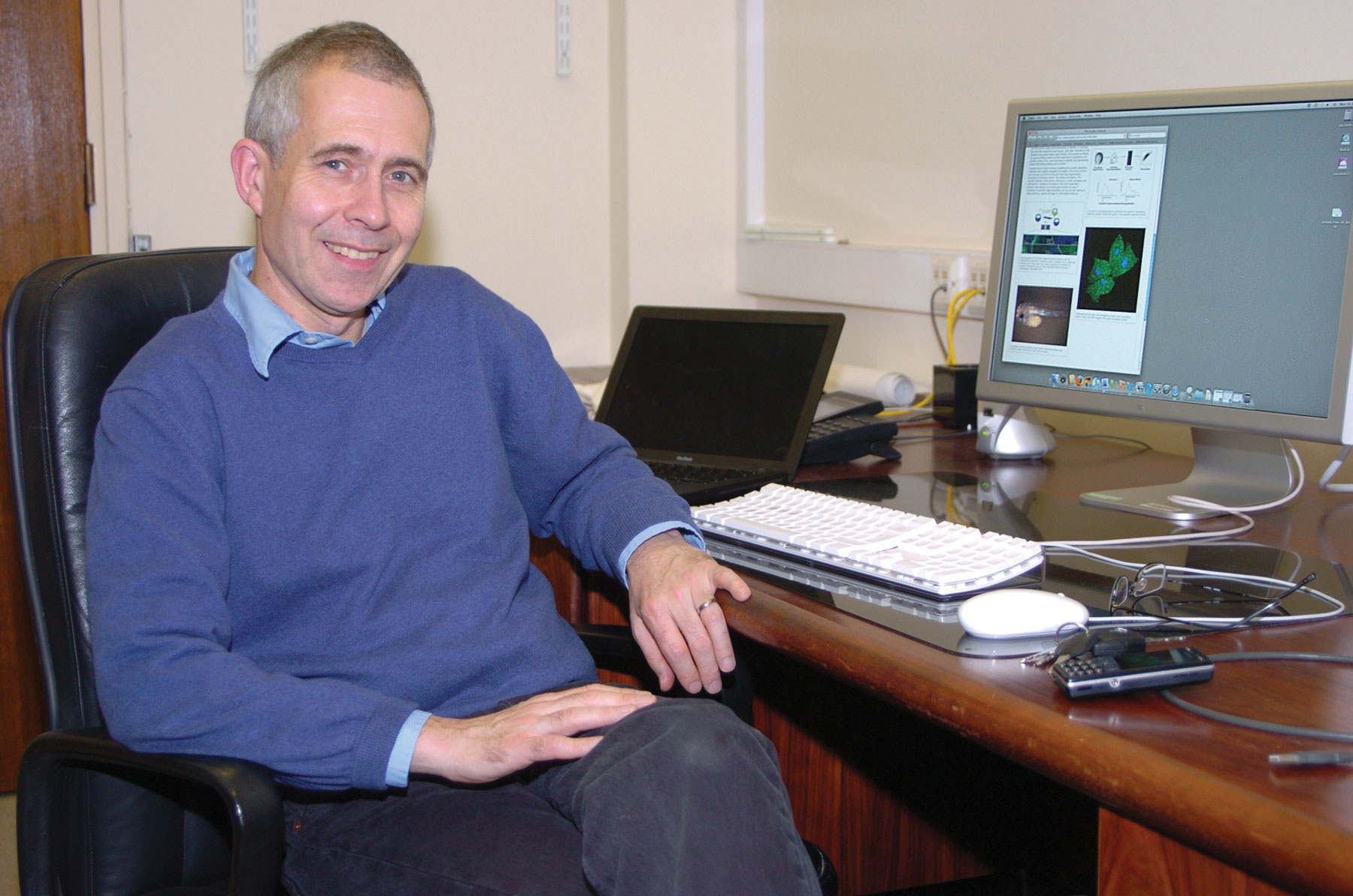
- Born: James Cuthbert Smith; 31 December 1954 (age 71)
- Education: Christ's College, Cambridge; Middlesex Hospital Medical School
- Spouse: Fiona Watt (m. 1979)
- Awards: Knight Bachelor (2017); Waddington Medal (2013); EMBO Gold Medal (1993)
- Scientific career
- Workplaces: Wellcome Trust; Francis Crick Institute
- Thesis: Studies of positional signalling along the antero-posterior axis of the developing chick limb (1979)
- Doctoral advisor: Lewis Wolpert
- Website: crick.ac.uk/jim-smith

Sir James Cuthbert Smith (born 31 December 1954) is an Emeritus Scientist at the Francis Crick Institute, Honorary Fellow of Christ's College, Cambridge and President of the Council at the Zoological Society of London.

== Education ==
Smith was educated at Latymer Upper School and graduated from the University of Cambridge with a Bachelor of Arts degree in Natural Sciences in 1976. He was awarded a PhD in 1979 by University College London (UCL) for research supervised by Lewis Wolpert at Middlesex Hospital Medical School.

== Career and research ==
Smith completed postdoctoral research appointments at Harvard Medical School from 1979 to 1981 and the Imperial Cancer Research Fund (now Cancer Research UK) from 1981 to 1984. In 1984 he joined the staff of the National Institute for Medical Research (NIMR), becoming head of the Division of Developmental Biology in 1991 and head of the Genes and Cellular Control Group in 1996. He moved to become director of the Gurdon Institute in 2001, returning to NIMR in 2009 to become its director. In 2014 he became Deputy CEO of the Medical Research Council in addition to his role as NIMR Director. When NIMR joined the CRUK London Research Institute as part of the Francis Crick Institute he became director of research at the Crick. He stepped down from his MRC and Crick roles in 2017 when he became Director of Science at Wellcome. He led the Wellcome Science Review in 2019. In 2021 he left Wellcome and became Secretary of the Zoological Society of London.

Smith's research has focused on how cells of the very early vertebrate embryo form the specialised tissues of muscle, skin, blood and bone. His discovery of a mesoderm-inducing factor secreted by a cell line and establishing its identity as activin transformed the study of induction in the early embryo. He also showed that activin specifies different cell types at different thresholds and that characteristic genes like Brachyury are turned on at specific concentrations, thus validating Lewis Wolpert's Positional Information French flag model of embryonic pattern formation. In other work he shed light on the molecular basis of gastrulation, and especially the role of non-canonical Wnt signalling. His earlier work demonstrated threshold responses in chick limb development and also showed that the mitogenic response to growth factors can be active when attached to the extracellular matrix.

== Awards and honours ==
Smith was elected as an EMBO Member in 1992, a Fellow of the Royal Society (FRS) in 1993 and of the Academy of Medical Sciences in 1998. He was awarded the Zoological Society of London Scientific Medal in 1989, the Feldberg Foundation award in 2000, the William Bate Hardy Prize in 2001 and the Waddington Medal by the British Society for Developmental Biology in 2013. In 2014 he was named by the London Evening Standard as one of the 1000 most influential Londoners, in the 'Innovators' section. He was also awarded the EMBO Gold Medal in 1993.

Smith was knighted in the 2017 New Year Honours for services to medical research and science education.

== Personal life ==
Smith married Fiona Watt in 1979 and has three children.
