= Martin Hume Johnson =

British scientist

Professor Martin Hume Johnson FRS FMedSci FRSB FRCOG
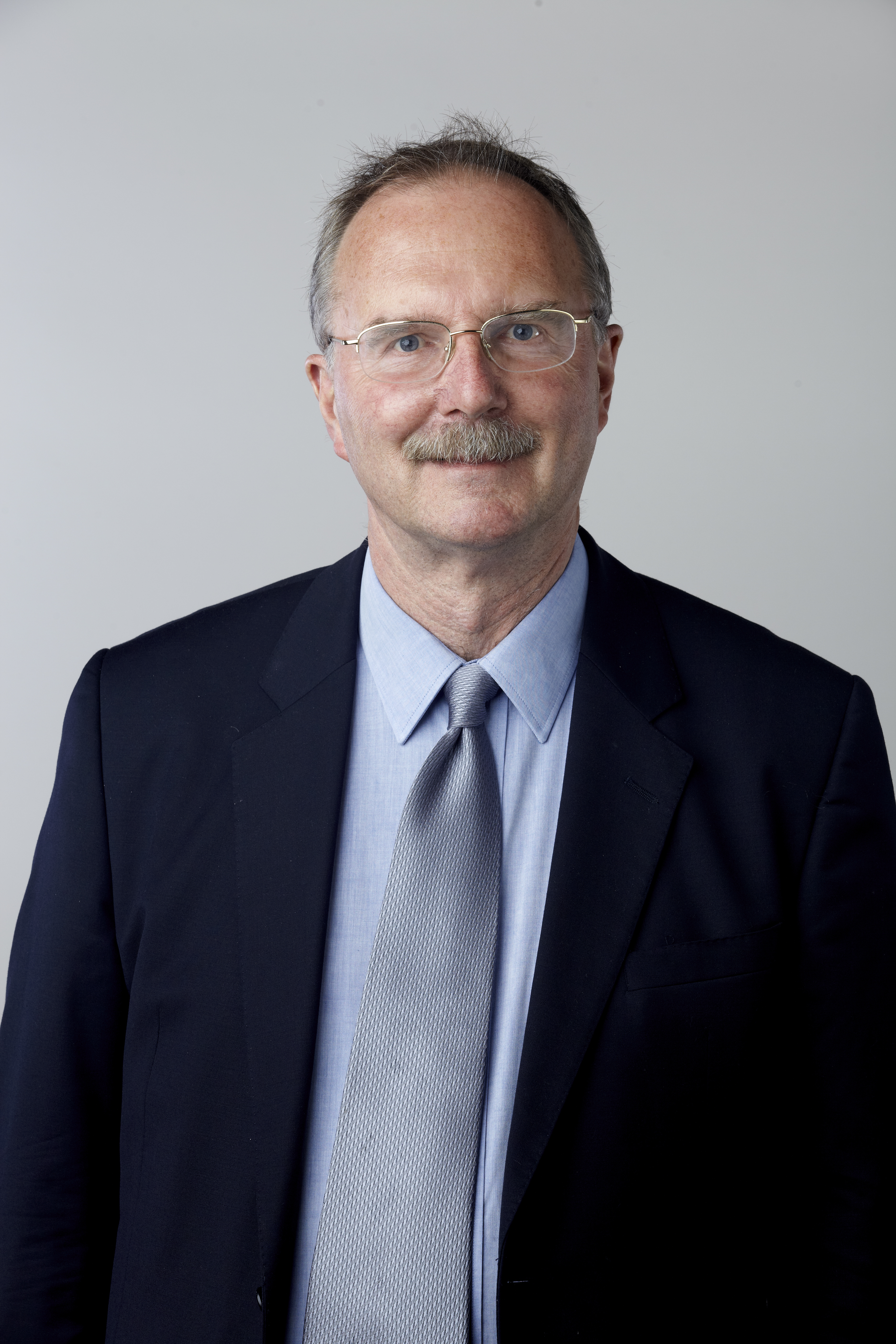
- Martin Johnson in 2014, portrait via the Royal Society
- Born: 19 December 1944 (age 81)
- Education: University of Cambridge
- Awards: FRS (2014); FMedSci (2012); FRSB (2012); FRCOG (2005)
- Scientific career
- Fields: Reproductive medicine; In vitro fertilisation (IVF); Embryogenesis
- Workplaces: University of Cambridge
- Thesis: An immunochemical analysis of factors affecting fertility (1969)
- Doctoral advisor: Robert Edwards (physiologist)
- Website: pdn.cam.ac.uk/staff/johnson

Martin Hume Johnson (born 1944) is a British scientist who is emeritus professor of Reproductive Sciences in the Department of Physiology, Development and Neuroscience (PDN) at the University of Cambridge.

== Education ==
Johnson was educated at Cheltenham Grammar School for Boys and Christ's College, Cambridge, where he was awarded Master of Arts and Doctor of Philosophy degrees in 1969 for immunochemical analysis of factors affecting fertility.

== Research ==
Currently, Johnson's research investigates the history of the reproductive and developmental sciences and their historical relationship to the development of human In vitro fertilisation and other clinical technologies, and to their regulation legally and ethically. Johnson collaborates with Kay Elder, at the Bourn Hall Clinic, Sarah Franklin and Nick Hopwood in the Department of History and Philosophy of Science, University of Cambridge.

Johnson has co-authored over 300 papers on reproductive and developmental science, history, ethics, law and medical education. Johnson is the co-editor of Essential Reproduction (now in its eighth edition), Sexuality Repositioned: diversity and the law, Death Rites and Rights and Birth Rites and Rights.

Johnson's research has been funded by the Wellcome Trust.

== Awards and honours ==
Johnson was elected a Fellow of the Royal Society (FRS) in 2014. His nomination reads:

Johnson's seminal scientific contribution was the discovery and analysis of cellular polarisation during early mammalian development. He showed that this event initiated the first lineage segregation: one lineage formed the outer implanting layer of the placenta while the fetal body developed form the other. Recent techniques have permitted further understanding of this vital and decisive moment, and they all depend and build on his foundations. He also contributed to human reproductive sciences with his work leading to change in clinical practice.

Johnson was elected a Fellow of the Academy of Medical Sciences (FMedSci) in 2012. His nomination reads:

Martin Johnson is Professor of Reproductive Sciences at the University of Cambridge. He has made fundamental contributions to our understanding of early mammalian development and of human reproduction. Johnson's work on mouse development shed light on the earliest steps of embryogenesis. He also contributed to our understanding of the timing of zygotic gene activation, optimised protocols for cryopreservation of mouse oocytes, and used transgenic mice to study erythropoietin production with me, and the role of glial cells in brain regeneration after traumatic damage. Johnson has also contributed significantly to issues surrounding the regulation of reproductive medicine.

Johnson is also a Fellow of the Royal College of Obstetricians and Gynaecologists (FRCOG) and a Fellow of the Royal Society of Biology (FRSB).

Having been, with Richard Gardner, Bob Edwards' first graduate student (1966–1969), Prof Johnson opened the Nobel Symposium on Bob's work in Stockholm, 2010.
