= Jenny Morton =

New Zealand neurobiologist

Jenny Morton FRSB
- Born: Anne Jennifer Morton; Kaikohe, New Zealand
- Education: University of Otago; University of Cambridge
- Scientific career
- Fields: Neurobiology; Huntington's disease; neurodegeneration; cognition
- Workplaces: Newnham College, Cambridge

Anne Jennifer Morton, FRSB, known as Jenny Morton, is a New Zealand neurobiologist and academic, specialising in neurodegenerative diseases. She has been a Fellow of Newnham College, Cambridge, since 1991 and a Professor of Neurobiology at the University of Cambridge since 2009. Her current research is focused on Huntington's disease, and she is using sheep as a large animal model for the disease. This research has led her to discover that sheep can recognise human faces.

== Early life and education ==
Morton was born in Kaikohe, New Zealand, and was raised in the country's Far North District. She undertook doctoral research in physiology at the University of Otago, completing her Doctor of Philosophy (PhD) degree in 1983. On 21 February 2009, the University of Cambridge admitted her to Master of Arts (MA Cantab) status. She was awarded a Doctor of Science (ScD) degree by the University of Cambridge in 2014.

== Academic career ==
Having completed her doctorate, Morton moved to England to join the Department of Pharmacology, University of Cambridge as a post-doctoral fellow. In 1991, she was appointed a lecturer at the university and elected a Fellow of Newnham College, Cambridge. Since 1995, she has been the director of studies in medicine and veterinary medicine at Newnham College. In 2005, she was made a Reader in Experimental Neurobiology in the Department of Pharmacology. In 2009, she was appointed Professor of Neurobiology in the Department of Physiology, Development and Neuroscience. She is the first New Zealand woman to be appointed to a professorship at Cambridge. From October 2009 to September 2010, she held a Royal Society Leverhulme Trust Senior Research Fellowship. In 2015, she was the Visiting Seelye Fellow at the University of Auckland.

=== Research ===
Morton's current research focuses on "understanding the mechanisms underlying neurodegeneration and on developing strategies to delay or prevent the death of neurones in injured or degenerating brain". She has specialised in Huntington's disease since 1993. Having undertaken research into Huntington's using transgenic mice, she moved into using transgenic sheep as a large animal model of Huntington's disease.

Morton's research with sheep has also led to an interest in measuring their learning and memory. Her team have been able to teach sheep to choose a familiar face over unfamiliar one when presented with two photographs, which has led to the discovery that sheep can recognise human faces.

== Honours ==
Morton is an elected Fellow of the Royal Society of Biology (FRSB).

== Selected works ==
- Morton, A. J.; Wood, N. I.; Hastings, M. H.; Hurelbrink, C.; Barker, R. A.; Maywood, E. S. (5 January 2005). "Disintegration of the Sleep-Wake Cycle and Circadian Timing in Huntington's Disease". The Journal of Neuroscience. 25 (1): 157–163. doi:10.1523/JNEUROSCI.3842-04.2005. PMC 6725210. PMID 15634777.
- Morton, A. J.; Skillings, E.; Bussey, T. J.; Saksida, L. M. (October 2006). "Measuring cognitive deficits in disabled mice using an automated interactive touchscreen system". Nature Methods. 3 (10): 767. doi:10.1038/nmeth1006-767. PMID 16990806. S2CID 30073312.
- Morton, A. J.; Glynn, D.; Leavens, W.; Zheng, Z.; Faull, R. L. M.; Skepper, J. N.; Wight, J. M. (March 2009). "Paradoxical delay in the onset of disease caused by super-long CAG repeat expansions in R6/2 mice". Neurobiology of Disease. 33 (3): 331–341. doi:10.1016/j.nbd.2008.11.015. PMID 19130884. S2CID 25607303.
- Morton, A. J.; Avanzo, L.; Chapouthier, G. (31 January 2011). "Executive Decision-Making in the Domestic Sheep". PLoS ONE. 6 (1) e15752. Bibcode:2011PLoSO...615752M. doi:10.1371/journal.pone.0015752. PMC 3031539. PMID 21305061.
- Goodman, A. O. G.; Rogers, L.; Pilsworth, S.; McAllister, C. J.; Shneerson, J. M.; Morton, A. J.; Barker, R. A. (20 November 2010). "Asymptomatic Sleep Abnormalities Are a Common Early Feature in Patients with Huntington's Disease". Current Neurology and Neuroscience Reports. 11 (2): 211–217. doi:10.1007/s11910-010-0163-x. PMID 21103960. S2CID 207333918.
- Morton, A. J.; Rudiger, S. R.; Wood, N. I.; Sawiak, S. J.; Brown, G. C.; Mclaughlan, C. J.; Kuchel, T. R.; Snell, R. G.; Faull, R. L. M.; Bawden, C. S. (31 January 2014). "Early and progressive circadian abnormalities in Huntington's disease sheep are unmasked by social environment". Human Molecular Genetics. 23 (13): 3375–3383. doi:10.1093/hmg/ddu047. PMID 24488771.
