= Ronald Bosanquet =

British barrister (1868–1952)

Bosanquet in 1943.

Sir Samuel Ronald Courthope Bosanquet QC (6 September 1868 – 5 November 1952) was a British barrister who served as an official referee of the Supreme Court from 1931 to 1943.

Bosanquet came from an old Huguenot settled in England family which produced many prominent lawyers. His father was Samuel Courthope Bosanquet, sometime High Sheriff of Monmouthshire and chairman of the quarter sessions, while his uncle was Sir Frederick Albert Bosanquet, Common Serjeant of the City of London.

Bosanquet was educated at Eton College and Trinity College, Cambridge, where he took second-class honours in the Law Tripos as well as a LLB, and where he was President of the Cambridge Union in 1891. He read in chambers with A. J. Ram, then was called to the Bar by the Inner Temple in 1893. Joining the Oxford Circuit, he became Recorder of Ludlow in 1919 and Recorder of Walsall in 1928. His practice was predominantly on circuit at quarter sessions, and he took silk in 1924. He was Chancellor of the Diocese of Hereford from 1928. In 1930, he was elected a Bencher of the Inner Temple. He also unsuccessfully stood as Conservative candidate for Stafford in the 1906 general election.

Bosanquet's most famous case was his defence of Major Herbert Rowse Armstrong, the solicitor accused of poisoning his wife, at the Hereford assizes in 1922, at which he was led by Sir Henry Curtis-Bennett. Bosanquet had known Armstrong for many years before, from the Oxford Circuit and having attended Cambridge at the same time.

In 1931, Bosanquet was appointed Official Referee of the Supreme Court, in succession to Sir William Hansell. He was described by The Times as "an excellent Referee, businesslike, courteous, and speedy", whose list of case was always full (the parties having some choice among the Referees). He was also chairman of quarter sessions of Monmouth from 1935 to 1950. He was knighted in 1942 and retired in 1943 upon reaching the age of 75.

Bosanquet was the author of several works, including A Magistrate's Handbook, a book on rating, and a volume of recollections, The Oxford Circuit.

He married in 1911 Mary Acland, eldest daughter of F. H. Anson, and a sister of Mrs Temple, the wife of Archbishop Temple. They had three daughters and a son, who was killed on active service in 1944. A grandson is the scientist Mike Bate.
