= Patricia Simpson =

British biologist

Patricia Simpson is a British developmental biologist. Simpson was a professor of Comparative Biology at the University of Cambridge from 2003 to 2010, and was the university's Director of Research for the academic year 2010/2011. She is currently an emeritus Professor of the Department of Zoology of the University of Cambridge, having previously been Professor of Comparative Embryology, and a Fellow of Newnham College. She was elected a Fellow of the Royal Society in 2000.

Patricia Simpson graduated with her PhD in 1976 from Universite de Paris VI, Pierre and Marie Curie University. Her research interests include organismal biology, evolution, and ecology, and she is distinguished for her work on insect development and evolution. Specifically, her research explores the pattern formation of sensory bristles in fruit flies. Her first major discovery was that pattern formation and growth of fly bristles are regulated by the same mechanism. By a study of genetic mosaics she demonstrated that cells develop into particular structures by means of local interactions with their neighbours.

She has made major contributions to the understanding of the process of lateral inhibition, whereby initially equivalent cells interact between themselves and subsequently adopt different fates. This process involves a conserved cellular receptor and is equally important in mammals; the work can be related to studies on human development and disease.

== Awards ==
- 1993: Silver medal of the Centre National de la Recherche Scientifque, France
- 1993: She was elected as the member of the EMBO
- 2000: Fellow of the Royal Society
- 2008: Waddington Medal of the British Society of Developmental Biology
- 2012: Fellow of the American Association for the Advancement of Science
- 2016: Honorary Fellowship from Newnham College, Cambridge
