= Miranda Wolpert =

British clinical psychologist and researcher (born 1962)

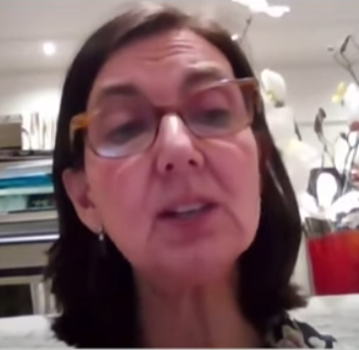
- Speaking at the 2021 World Economic Forum
- Education: University of Cambridge; University of Surrey
- Scientific career
- Workplaces: University College London; Wellcome Trust

Miranda Wolpert, Lady Sales MBE is professor of evidence-based practice and mental health at University College London. She was made a Member of the Order of the British Empire in the 2017 New Year Honours for her work on young people's mental health. She is Director of Mental Health at the Wellcome Trust.

== Early life and education ==
Wolpert is the daughter of developmental biologist Lewis Wolpert. She attended St Paul's Girls' School in London and studied history at Churchill College, Cambridge. She earned her master's degree in history at the University of Surrey, before starting a diploma in clinical psychology. She worked in the North West Thames Regional Health Authority. Wolpert earned her Doctorate of Psychology (PsychD) at the University of Surrey in 1998.

== Research and career ==
In 2002, Wolpert co-founded the Child Outcomes Research Consortium, which collects and disseminates evidence that looks to improve young people's mental health. Wolpert joined University College London in 2005. Wolpert founded the Evidence-Based Practice Unit at University College London in 2006. The centre is a collaboration between University College London and the Anna Freud National Centre for Children and Families.

She was appointed professor in evidence based research at University College London in 2016. Her research considers how to support and evaluate effective approaches to young people's mental health needs. She leads the University College London Children's Policy Research Unit Mental Health strand, which advises the Government of the United Kingdom. She uses large anonymised datasets to understand how age, gender, ethnicity and type/severity of condition impact the success of a mental health treatment. After Jeremy Hunt claimed that Child and Young People's Mental Health Services as "the biggest single area of weakness in NHS provision at the moment", Wolpert called for research into whether all provision is effective. She also called for more research into the impact of screen time on young people's mental health.

She serves as national informatics lead for the NHS England Children and Young People's Improving Access to Psychological Therapies. Wolpert was awarded an MBE for services to youth mental health in the 2017 New Year Honours. In March 2019 Wolpert was made head of the Wellcome Trust Priority Area in Mental Health. In this capacity, she will invest over £200 million in initiatives that transform the lives of young people with mental health conditions. She has written for the HuffPost.

== Personal life ==
She is married to the judge Lord Sales.

== Selected publications ==
Wolpert, Miranda (2014). Guide to Using Outcomes and Feedback Tools with Children, Young People and Families. CAMHS Press. ISBN 9780957209664.
