= Morphogen =

Biological substance that guides development by non-uniform distribution

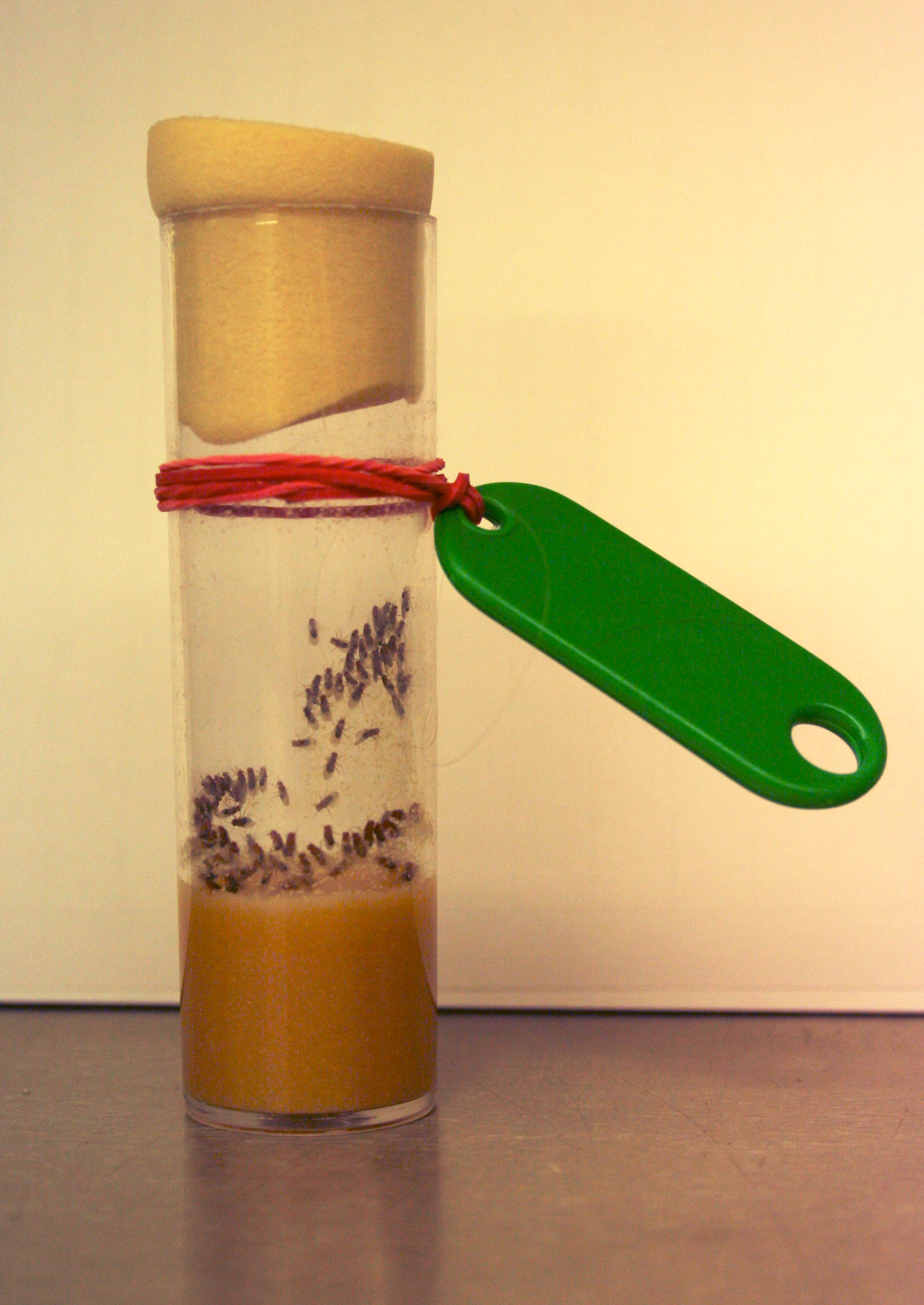
Morphogenesis of Drosophila fruit flies is intensively studied in the laboratory

A morphogen is a signaling molecule that contributes to morphogenesis and pattern formation, which are key processes in developmental biology. Morphogens help organize tissues by creating spatial and temporal differences in signaling activity. They are typically defined as signals that generate distinct cellular responses across a population of cells.

These responses depend on several factors, including signal concentration and the duration of exposure. They are also influenced by tissue context and local gene regulatory networks, which affect how cells interpret the signal.

Morphogen distribution can arise through multiple mechanisms. Diffusion can generate simple, static concentration gradients characteristic of the classical model. However, more complex patterns of distribution can also occur. Mechanisms such as active transport, cytoneme-mediated signaling, extracellular vesicles, and relay signaling contribute to dynamic or spatially complex gradients.

Spatial differences in morphogen signaling interact with feedback loops, tissue mechanics, and gene regulatory networks. Together, these processes help determine cell fate during development. Morphogens play a central role in tissue patterning and body plan formation, making them also important in evolutionary developmental biology (evo-devo).

== History ==
The term was coined by Alan Turing in the paper "The Chemical Basis of Morphogenesis", where he predicted a chemical mechanism for biological pattern formation, decades before the formation of such patterns was demonstrated.

The concept of the morphogen has a long history in developmental biology, dating back to the work of the pioneering Drosophila (fruit fly) geneticist, Thomas Hunt Morgan, in the early 20th century. Lewis Wolpert refined the morphogen concept in the 1960s with the French flag model, which described how a morphogen could subdivide a tissue into domains of different target gene expression (corresponding to the colours of the French flag). This model was championed by the leading Drosophila biologist, Peter Lawrence. Christiane Nüsslein-Volhard was the first to identify a morphogen, Bicoid, one of the transcription factors present in a gradient in the Drosophila syncitial embryo. She was awarded the 1995 Nobel Prize in Physiology and Medicine for her work explaining the morphogenic embryology of the common fruit fly. Groups led by Gary Struhl and Stephen Cohen then demonstrated that a secreted signalling protein, decapentaplegic (the Drosophila homologue of transforming growth factor beta), acted as a morphogen during the later stages of Drosophila development.

== Mechanisms ==
During early development, morphogen signaling helps organize cell fate by generating differences in gene expression across tissues. Multiple mechanisms have been proposed to explain how this spatial patterning arises. Early work focused on the classical model, also known as the French flag model, but later research has expanded this view.

In classic models, morphogens provide spatial information by forming a concentration gradient that subdivides a field of cells by inducing or maintaining the expression of different target genes at distinct concentration thresholds. Thus, cells far from the source of the morphogen receive low levels of the signal and express only low-threshold target genes. In contrast, cells close to the source receive higher levels and express both low- and high-threshold target genes. Distinct cell types emerge as a consequence of the different combinations of target gene expression. In this way, the field of cells is subdivided according to their position relative to the source of the morphogen. The gradient-based model has traditionally been used to explain how cell type diversity can be generated in embryonic development in animals.

Some of the earliest and best-studied morphogens are transcription factors in early Drosophila melanogaster (fruit fly) embryos, where proteins diffuse through a shared cytoplasm before cells fully form. However, in most other systems, morphogens are secreted signaling proteins that act between cells through pathways such as Hedgehog, Wnt, BMP, and Nodal.

Although the classical gradient model has been highly influential, many developmental systems use additional or alternative mechanisms. Morphogen distribution can involve active transport, cytoneme-mediated signaling, extracellular vesicles, or relay signaling between cells. Cells also interpret signals based on exposure time, feedback loops, gene regulatory networks, and mechanical properties of tissues. Some of these mechanisms, such as cytoneme-based transport, vesicle-mediated signaling, and the integration of mechanical forces, remain active areas of research. There is ongoing debate about how widely they apply and how they interact with classical gradient-based models. As a result, current understanding of morphogen signaling reflects a combination of well-established principles and emerging models.

== Genes and signals ==
A morphogen spreads from a localized source and forms a concentration gradient across a developing tissue. In developmental biology, 'morphogen' is rigorously used to mean a signalling molecule that acts directly on cells (not through serial induction) to produce specific cellular responses that depend on morphogen concentration. This definition concerns the mechanism, not any specific chemical formula, so simple compounds such as retinoic acid (the active metabolite of retinol or vitamin A) may also act as morphogens. The model is not universally accepted due to specific issues with setting up a gradient in the tissue outlined in the French flag model and subsequent work showing that the morphogen gradient of the Drosophila embryo is more complex than the simple gradient model would indicate.

== Examples ==
Proposed mammalian morphogens include retinoic acid, sonic hedgehog (SHH), transforming growth factor beta (TGF-β)/bone morphogenic protein (BMP), and Wnt/beta-catenin. Morphogens in Drosophila include decapentaplegic and hedgehog.

During development, retinoic acid, a metabolite of vitamin A, is used to stimulate the growth of the posterior end of the organism. Retinoic acid binds to retinoic acid receptors that act as transcription factors to regulate the expression of Hox genes. Exposure of embryos to exogenous retinoids, especially in the first trimester, results in birth defects due to deregulation of gene expression.

TGF-β family members are involved in dorsoventral patterning and the formation of some organs. Binding of TGF-β to type II TGF beta receptors recruits type I receptors, thereby causing the latter to be transphosphorylated. The type I receptors activate Smad proteins that in turn act as transcription factors that regulate gene transcription.

Sonic hedgehog (SHH) is a morphogen that are essential to early patterning in the developing embryo. SHH binds to the Patched receptor which in the absence of SHH inhibits the Smoothened receptor. Activated Smoothened in turn causes Gli1, Gli2, and Gli3 to be translocated into the nucleus where they activate target genes such at PTCH1 and Engrailed.

== Fruit fly ==
Drosophila melanogaster has an unusual developmental system, in which the first thirteen cell divisions of the embryo occur within a syncytium prior to cellularization. Essentially the embryo remains a single cell with over 8000 nuclei evenly spaced near the membrane until the fourteenth cell division, when independent membranes furrow between the nuclei, separating them into independent cells. As a result, in fly embryos transcription factors such as Bicoid or Hunchback can act as morphogens because they can freely diffuse between nuclei to produce smooth gradients of concentration without relying on specialized intercellular signalling mechanisms. Although there is some evidence that homeobox transcription factors similar to these can pass directly through cell membranes, this mechanism is not believed to contribute greatly to morphogenesis in cellularized systems.

In most developmental systems, such as human embryos or later Drosophila development, syncytia occur only rarely (such as in skeletal muscle), and morphogens are generally secreted signalling proteins. These proteins bind to the extracellular domains of transmembrane receptor proteins, which use an elaborate process of signal transduction to communicate the level of morphogen to the nucleus. The nuclear targets of signal transduction pathways are usually transcription factors, whose activity is regulated in a manner that reflects the level of morphogen received at the cell surface. Thus, secreted morphogens act to generate gradients of transcription factor activity just like those that are generated in the syncitial Drosophila embryo.

Discrete target genes respond to different thresholds of morphogen activity. The expression of target genes is controlled by segments of DNA called 'enhancers' to which transcription factors bind directly. Once bound, the transcription factor then stimulates or inhibits the transcription of the gene and thus controls the level of expression of the gene product (usually a protein). 'Low-threshold' target genes require only low levels of morphogen activity to be regulated and feature enhancers that contain many high-affinity binding sites for the transcription factor. 'High-threshold' target genes have relatively fewer binding sites or low-affinity binding sites that require much greater levels of transcription factor activity to be regulated.

The general mechanism by which the morphogen model works, can explain the subdivision of tissues into patterns of distinct cell types, assuming it is possible to create and maintain a gradient. However, the morphogen model is often invoked for additional activities such as controlling the growth of the tissue or orienting the polarity of cells within it (for example, the hairs on your forearm point in one direction) which cannot be explained by model.

== Eponyms ==
The organizing role that morphogens play during animal development was acknowledged in the 2014 naming of a new beetle genus, Morphogenia. The type species, Morphogenia struhli, was named in honour of Gary Struhl, the US developmental biologist who was instrumental in demonstrating that the decapentaplegic and wingless genes encode proteins that function as morphogens during Drosophila development.
