= Robin Lovell-Badge =

British biologist (born 1953)

Robin Lovell-Badge CBE FRS FMedSci
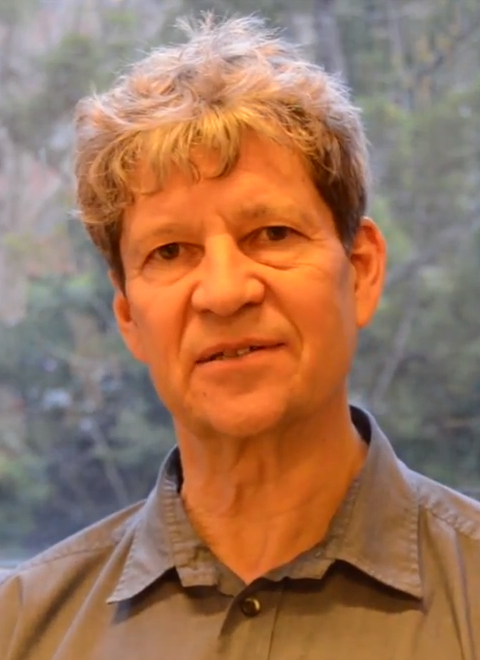
- Lovell-Badge in 2017
- Born: June 14, 1953
- Awards: Louis-Jeantet Prize for Medicine (1995) Waddington Medal of the British Society for Developmental Biology (2010) Genetics Society Medal (2022)

Robin Howard Lovell-Badge is a British developmental biologist. He is most well known for his discovery, along with Peter Goodfellow, of the SRY gene on the Y-chromosome that is the determinant of sex in mammals. They shared the 1995 Louis-Jeantet Prize for Medicine for their discovery. He was awarded the 2010 Waddington Medal from the British Society for Developmental Biology and the 2022 Genetics Society Medal. He is currently a Senior Group Leader and Head of the Laboratory of Stem Cell Biology and Developmental Genetics at the Francis Crick Institute in Central London.
