= British Society for Developmental Biology =

Scientific society

The British Society for Developmental Biology (BSDB) is a scientific society promoting developmental biology research; it is open to anyone with an interest in the subject who agrees with the principles of the Society.

== History ==
The British Society for Developmental Biology was founded in 1948 as the London Embryologists’ Club. In 1964, the club was expanded into a scientific society, named the Society for Developmental Biology. In 1964, the Society for the Study of Growth and Development in the United States had also voted to take on the same name, and they took over sponsorship of the journal Developmental Biology in 1966. Consequently, the smaller British society changed to its current name in 1969.

== Awards ==
The society administers four annual awards and a studentship. The Waddington Medal was first awarded in 1998. It is named after C. H. Waddington, a leading British embryologist and geneticist, and is awarded to "an outstanding individual who has made major contributions to any aspect of Developmental Biology in the UK".

Award winners include:

- 1998 Cheryll Tickle
- 1999 Rosa Beddington
- 2000 Peter Lawrence
- 2001 Mike Bate
- 2002 Jonathan Slack
- 2003 Julian Lewis
- 2004 Jeff Williams
- 2005 Michael Akam
- 2006 Claudio Stern
- 2007 David Ish-Horowicz
- 2008 Pat Simpson
- 2009 Liz Robertson
- 2010 Robin Lovell-Badge
- 2011 Christopher Wylie
- 2012 Alfonso Martinez Arias
- 2013 Jim Smith
- 2014 Philip Ingham
- 2015 Lewis Wolpert
- 2016 Enrico Coen
- 2017 William Harris
- 2018 Richard Lavenham Gardner

In 2016, the society added the Cheryll Tickle Medal, which is awarded to a mid-career female scientist. It is named after the embryologist Cheryll Tickle, the first winner of the Waddington Medal. Winners include:

- 2016 Abigail Saffron Tucker
- 2017 Jenny Nichols
- 2018 Christiana Ruhrberg
- 2019 Bénédicte Sanson

The society also has awards for early career scientists: The Beddington Medal is awarded annually for the "best PhD thesis in developmental biology" defended in the year prior to the award; the Dennis Summerbell Lecture is an award that is delivered annually by a junior researcher at either PhD or postdoctoral level; and summer studentships are available for undergraduate students.
