= Elizabeth Robertson =

British geneticist

Elizabeth Robertson CBE FRS MAE
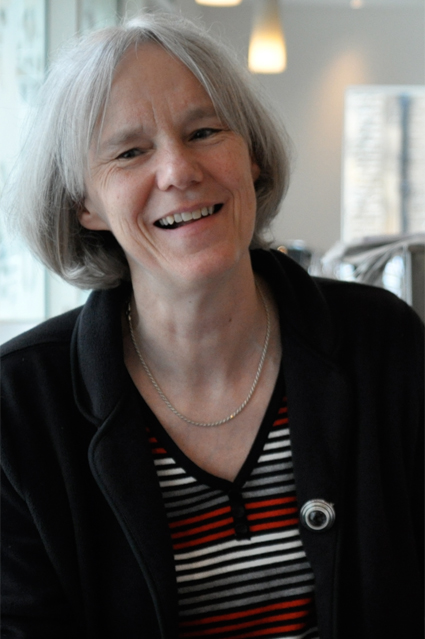
- Born: Elizabeth Jane Robertson
- Education: University of Oxford (BA, MA); University of Cambridge (PhD)
- Awards: Royal Medal (2016); EMBO Member (2002); Suffrage Science award (2011)
- Scientific career
- Workplaces: Columbia University; Harvard University; University of Oxford
- Doctoral advisor: Martin Evans

Elizabeth Jane Robertson CBE FRS MAE is a British developmental biologist based at the Sir William Dunn School of Pathology, University of Oxford. She is Professor of Developmental Biology at Oxford and a Wellcome Trust Principal Research Fellow. She is best known for her pioneering work in developmental genetics, showing that genetic mutations could be introduced into the mouse germ line by using genetically altered embryonic stem cells. This discovery opened up a major field of experimentation for biologists and clinicians.

== Education ==
Robertson earned her Bachelor of Arts degree from the University of Oxford. She received a PhD from the University of Cambridge in 1982 under the supervision of Martin Evans.

== Career and research ==
After her PhD, she stayed on at the University of Cambridge for her postdoctoral fellowship and continued to work there as a research assistant following the completion of her fellowship. She was a professor first at Columbia University and then Harvard University before moving to the University of Oxford. In her lab at Columbia she was the first to show that embryonic stem cells carrying genetic mutations could contribute to all parts of the adult mouse body, including the cells that eventually make up the gametes, i.e. sperm and egg cells, allowing these mutations to be transmitted to the next generation. She used this approach to test the role of specific growth factors in embryonic development, and to screen for previously unknown genes that prevent normal development. Robertson's work was among the first to show that the disruption of many genes has surprisingly little effect on development and organismal phenotype, contributing to a long-running challenge in the understanding of the robustness of biological systems. She has also made significant contributions to the question of how the early embryo determines the anterior-posterior polarity that patterns the embryo from head to tail and the mechanisms that pattern the embryo from left to right.

Robertson currently serves as an editor of the journal Development. She serves on the editorial boards of Developmental Biology, Current Opinion in Genetics & Development, and Developmental Cell.

== Honours and awards ==
Robertson was appointed Commander of the Order of the British Empire (CBE) in the 2024 New Year Honours for services to medical sciences.

- 2016: Royal Medal "for her innovative work within the field of mouse embryology and development, establishing the pathways involved in early body planning of the mammalian embryo."
- Fellow of the Royal Society, since 2003
- Fellow of the Academy of Medical Sciences, since 2016
- Member of the European Molecular Biology Organisation (EMBO) since 2002
- Wellcome Trust Principal Research Fellow
- Chair of the British Society for Developmental Biology
- Winner of the 2008 Edwin G. Conklin Medal (The Society for Developmental Biology)
- Fellow at the David and Lucile Packard Foundation 1990–1995
- Chair of General Motors Cancer Research Foundation
- Sloan Prize Committee
- Member of General Motors Cancer Research Foundation Assembly
- Associate member of the European Molecular Biology Organization
- 2011 Member of Academia Europaea (MAE)
- 2011 Suffrage Science award
- 2009 Waddington Medal from the British Society for Developmental Biology
- 2007 Rockefeller University's Pearl Meister Greengard Prize
- 1992 The American Association for Cancer Research: Cornelius P Rhoads Award
- 1990–1995 Stohlman Scholar for the Leukemia Society of America
- 1990 Irma T Hirschl Career Development Award
- 1989 March of Dimes Basil O'Connor Starter Scholar Award
