= Bill Harris (neuroscientist) =

Neuroscientist, born 1950

- Born: November 26, 1950 (age 75)
- Spouse: Christine Holt
- Awards: Fellow of the Royal Society (2007), Fellow of the Academy of Medical Sciences (2007), Elected Member of EMBO (20120; Waddington Medal (2017)
- Scientific career
- Fields: neuroscience
- Institutions: University of California, San Diego; Cambridge University
- Thesis: Color Vision in Drosophila (1976)
- Doctoral advisor: Seymour Benzer; David Hubel, Torsten Wiesel (postdoc)
- Website: www.pdn.cam.ac.uk/directory/william-harris

William Anthony Harris (born November 26, 1950) is a Canadian-born neuroscientist, Professor of Anatomy at Cambridge University, and fellow of Clare College, Cambridge. He was head of the Department of Physiology, Development and Neuroscience since its formation in 2006 until his retirement in 2018.

== Awards and honours ==
He was elected a Fellow of the Royal Society in 2007, a Fellow of the Academy of Medical Sciences in 2007, and a member of the European Molecular Biology Organisation in 2012. In 2017, he was awarded the Waddington Medal by the British Society for Developmental Biology for his work on the development of the visual system.

== Bibliography ==
- Harris, W. A. (24 May 2022). Zero to Birth: How the Human Brain Is Built. Princeton, New Jersey: Princeton University Press. ISBN 978-0691211312.
