= Mike Bate =

British developmental biologist (born 1943)

- Born: Christopher Michael Bate; 21 December 1943 (age 82); Epsom, England
- Education: St Paul's School, London
- Alma mater: University of Oxford; University of Cambridge
- Known for: Research on neuronal development, axon guidance, and neuromuscular development in insects
- Awards: Fellow of the Royal Society (1997)
- Scientific career
- Fields: Developmental biology, neurobiology
- Institutions: University of Cambridge
- Doctoral advisor: John Treherne

Christopher Michael "Mike" Bate FRS (born 21 December 1943) is a British developmental biologist whose research has focused on the formation of the nervous system and neuromuscular networks during embryonic development. He is Emeritus Professor of Developmental Neurobiology in the Department of Zoology at the University of Cambridge and a Fellow of King's College, Cambridge.

== Early life and education ==
Bate was born in Epsom, England, on 21 December 1943. The son of John Gordon Bate, M.B. Ch.B., an R.A.F. doctor and later a pathologist, he spent part of his early childhood in Surrey and London. His paternal grandfather was Herbert Bate, Dean of York 1932–41. His mother, Rachel Denise, was a musician and viola player, and daughter of Samuel Ronald Courthope Bosanquet, KC, recorder of Walsall. A great-uncle on the maternal side, William Temple, was Archbishop of Canterbury from 1942 to 1944.

He was educated at several preparatory schools and later at St Paul's School, London. Initially intending to pursue languages and a diplomatic career, he switched to biology despite difficulties with mathematics and physical sciences.

Bate studied zoology at Trinity College, Oxford, beginning in 1963, where he was taught by prominent biologists including Niko Tinbergen, John Gurdon, and Charles Elton. He later moved to the University of Cambridge for doctoral research under John Treherne, beginning in 1968, working on insect neurobiology and behaviour.

== Research and career ==
Following his PhD, Bate carried out postdoctoral research in Australia at the Australian National University, where he began pioneering work on insect embryos and the early development of the nervous system. He subsequently worked in Germany, including Freiburg and Tübingen, where exposure to emerging genetic approaches—particularly through interactions with Christiane Nüsslein-Volhard—influenced his transition toward developmental genetics.

Bate joined the Department of Zoology at the University of Cambridge in 1980, where he later became Professor of Developmental Neurobiology. He was elected a Fellow of King's College, Cambridge, and subsequently became emeritus professor.

His early work used grasshopper embryos to analyse the development of identified neurons and axon pathways. He is credited with helping to establish the concept of pioneer neurons, early-forming neurons whose axons provide guidance routes for later-growing axons.

Bate later transferred these developmental studies to the fruit fly Drosophila melanogaster, demonstrating common principles of neuronal development across insect species. His laboratory combined genetic, molecular, cellular and electrophysiological approaches to study how motor circuits are assembled and how coordinated movement emerges during embryogenesis.

A major strand of his later research concerned muscle patterning and the formation of the neuromuscular system in Drosophila. His group investigated the specification of muscle founder cells, myoblast fusion, the establishment of synaptic connections between motor neurons and muscles, and the maturation of embryonic neural activity.

== Awards and honours ==
- Member of the European Molecular Biology Organization (2010)
- Fellow of the Royal Society (1997)
- Fellow, King's College, Cambridge (date not stated)
- Waddington Medal from the British Society for Developmental Biology (2001)

== Selected publications ==
Goodman, C. S.; Bate, M.; Spitzer, N. C. (1981). "Embryonic development of identified neurons: origin and transformation of the H cell." Journal of Neuroscience.

Thomas, J. B.; Bastiani, M. J.; Bate, M.; Goodman, C. S. (1984). "From grasshopper to Drosophila: a common plan for neuronal development." Nature.

Bate, M. (1990). "The embryonic development of larval muscles in Drosophila." Development.

Bate, M. (1993). "The mesoderm and its derivatives." In: The Development of Drosophila melanogaster.

Rushton, E.; Drysdale, R.; Abmayr, S. M.; Michelson, A. M.; Bate, M. (1995). "Mutations in a novel gene, myoblast city, provide evidence in support of the founder cell hypothesis for Drosophila muscle development." Development.

Bate, M.; Broadie, K. (eds.) (1995). The Development of Drosophila melanogaster.
