= A549 cell =

Cell line

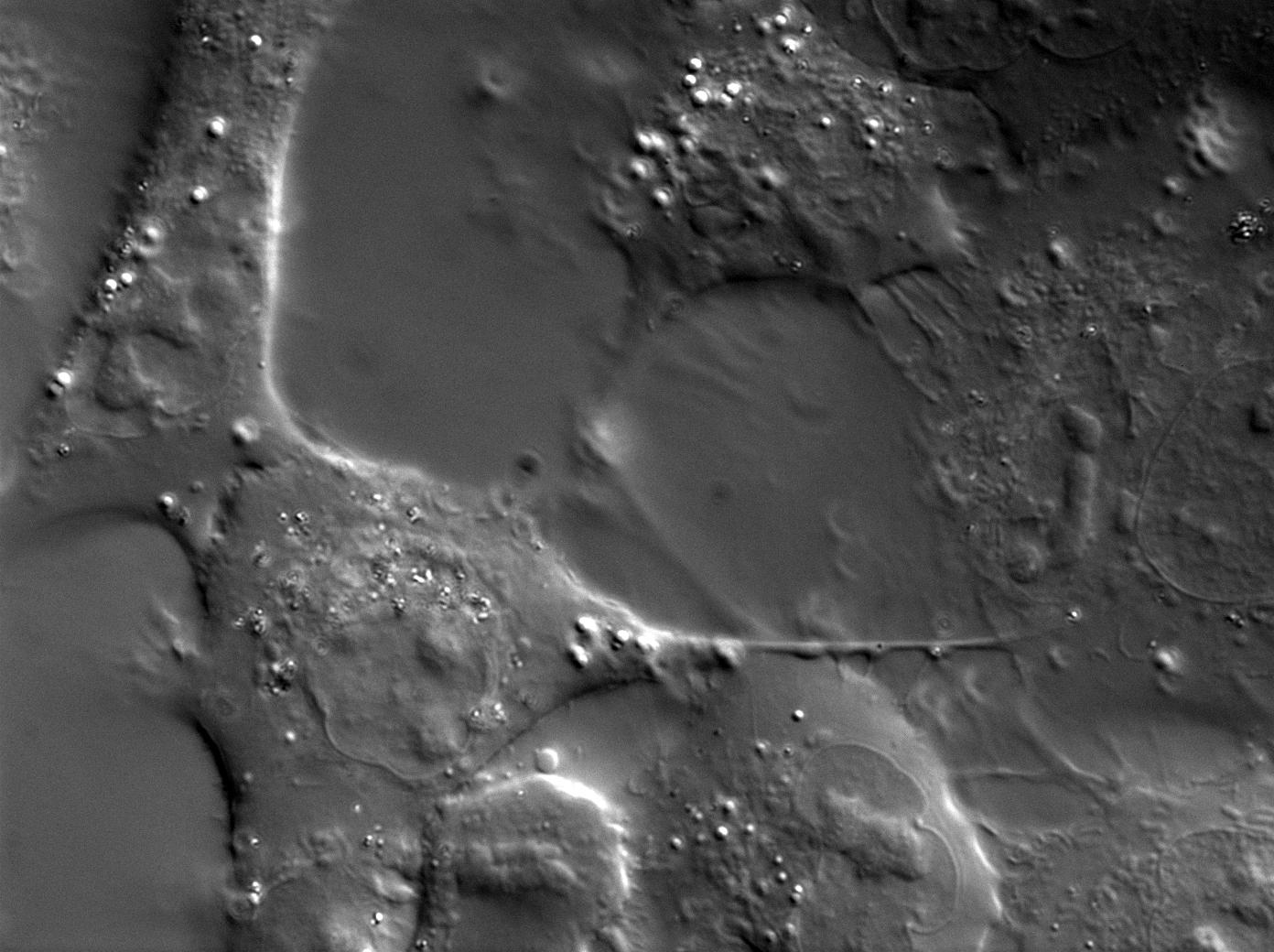
A549 cells under DIC microscopy, from a 3-4 days old culture, showing an abundance of intercellular connections, including possible cytonemes, filopodia and other epithelial bridges. (These cells have endocytosed 25x73 nm colloidal gold nanorods.)

A549 cells are adenocarcinomic human alveolar basal epithelial cells, and constitute a cell line that was first developed in 1972 by D. J. Giard, et al. through the removal and culturing of cancerous lung tissue in the explanted tumor of a 58-year-old caucasian male. The cells are used as models for the study of lung cancer and the development of drug therapies against it.

== Characteristics ==
A549 cells, as found in the lung tissue of their origin, are squamous and responsible for the diffusion of some substances, such as water and electrolytes, across alveoli. If A549 cells are cultured in vitro, they grow as a monolayer; adherent or attaching to the culture flask. The cells are able to synthesize lecithin and contain high levels of unsaturated fatty acids, which are important to maintain membrane phospholipids. A549 cells are widely used as a type II pulmonary epithelial cell model for drug metabolism and as a transfection host. When grown for a sufficiently long time in cell culture, A549 cells may begin to differentiate, as signaled by the presence of multilamellar bodies.

== Usage ==
A549 cells have served as models of alveolar Type II pulmonary epithelium, finding utility in research examining the metabolic processing of lung tissue and possible mechanisms of drug delivery to the tissue. In context of lung cancer drug development, the cells have served as testing grounds for novel drugs - such as paclitaxel, docetaxel, and bevacizumab - both in vitro and in vivo through cell culture and xenografting, respectively. Single-cell tracking of A549 has enabled the elaboration of pedigree-tree profiles and demonstrate correlations in behavior among sister cells and their descendants. Such observations of correlations can be used as proxy measurements to identify cellular stress and inheritance as a response to drug treatment. A549 has also been employed in viral research and associated protein expression changes as a consequence of viral infection. Although A549 is a cancer cell line, it has also been studied for its response to tuberculosis, specifically the production of chemokines as it is induced by the invading bacteria.
