= David Ish-Horowicz =

British scientist (1948–2024)

David Ish-Horowicz, FRS (2 August 1948 – 19 July 2024) was a British biologist. He was a professor of cell and developmental biology at University College London (from 2013). Between 1987 and 2013, he was a principal scientist and head of the Developmental Genetics Laboratory at Cancer Research UK (formerly Imperial Cancer Research Fund). He was elected a Fellow of the Royal Society in 2002 and won the Waddington Medal from the British Society for Developmental Biology in 2007. He was a member of the scientific advisory committee of the Lister Institute of Preventive Medicine. Ish-Horowicz was a member of the European Molecular Biology Organization from 1985.

== Background ==
Ish-Horowicz was born on 2 August 1948. His father was Moshe Ish-Horowicz (1916–2008), a prominent leader in the development of Reform Judaism in Manchester.

He was educated at Manchester Grammar School and Pembroke College, Cambridge (BA, 1969), and researched at the MRC Laboratory of Molecular Biology while at Darwin College, Cambridge (PhD, 1973), and was a postdoctoral fellow in Basel.

David Ish-Horowicz died from a brain tumour at his home in Oxford, on 19 July 2024, at the age of 75.
