= John Philip Trinkaus =

John Philip "Trink" Trinkaus (23 May 1918, Rockville Centre, New York – 8 February 2003, Guilford, Connecticut) was an American embryologist and one of the world's leading experts on in vivo cell motility.

== Biography ==
Trinkaus graduated in 1940 with a B.A. in biology from Wesleyan University and in 1941 with an M.A. from Columbia University. In 1941 he matriculated at Johns Hopkins University, but WW II interrupted his graduate study. In August 1942 he was drafted into the U.S. Army. In the spring of 1943 he went on leave for a week to marry Galina Gorokhoff, whom he had met a few years earlier at the Marine Biological Laboratory in Woods Hole. After being stationed in the United States and training U.S. Army Air Force officers in the use of oxygen equipment, he was sent to Italy in the autumn of 1944 to train officers in the use of G-suits. He was discharged from the U.S. Army in December 1945. In 1948 he graduated with a Ph.D. in embryology from Johns Hopkins University.

In 1948 Trinkaus became an instructor in Yale University's department of zoology (which later became the department of biology). He was soon promoted to full professor, retaining that position until he retired as professor emeritus. With few exceptions, he spent his summers at the Marine Biological Laboratory in Woods Hole. For the academic year 1959–1960 he was a Guggenheim Fellow at the Collège de France. During that year he met the woman, Madeleine Robineaux, who was to become his second wife. After divorcing their spouses, they married in October 1963. His 1969 book Cells into Organs. The Forces That Shape the Embryo became a classic treatise on cell and tissue movement during embryonic development and cell invasion of bodily tissues. A greatly enlarged 2nd edition was published in 1984.

He found a particularly appropriate research subject in the fish Fundulus heteroclitus. The transparent eggs and embryos of this teleost served his needs, as much of his research was primarily observational. Though he used dye-stains and transmission electron microscopy, many of his research publications were based on simple photomicrographic images of the teleost eggs. Through observation and dissection, Trinkaus became an expert on the developmental processes occurring within the eggs. His expertise led him to clarify the relevant terminology, as he named or renamed several internal structures including the yolk syncytial layer (YSL) and yolk cytoplasmic layer (YCL).

Trinkaus was a member of NASA's U.S. Space Biology Advisory Panel from 1976 to 1979. He was the author or co-author of about 50 scientific articles during his career. His autobiography was published posthumously in 2004.

== Awards and honors ==
- 1959 — Guggenheim Fellowship
- 1995 — Edward Grant Conklin Medal from the Society of Developmental Biology.
- 1988 — "Trinkfest" (a Festschrift or retirement party) held by the Marine Biological Laboratory in celebration of Trinkaus's 70th birthday

== Selected publications ==
- Trinkaus, J. P. (1949). "The Surface Gel Layer of Fundulus Eggs in Relation to Epiboly". Proceedings of the National Academy of Sciences. 35 (4): 218–225. Bibcode:1949PNAS...35..218T. doi:10.1073/pnas.35.4.218. ISSN 0027-8424. PMC 1063003. PMID 16588888.
- Trinkaus, J. P. (1951). "A study of the mechanism of epiboly in the egg of Fundulus heteroclitus". Journal of Experimental Zoology. 118 (2): 269–319. doi:10.1002/jez.1401180204.
- Trinkaus, J. P.; Groves, P. W. (1955). "Differentiation in Culture of Mixed Aggregates of Dissociated Tissue Cells". Proceedings of the National Academy of Sciences. 41 (10): 787–795. Bibcode:1955PNAS...41..787T. doi:10.1073/pnas.41.10.787. PMC 528186. PMID 16589751.
- Trinkaus, J. P.; Vaughan, R. B. (December 1966). "Movements of Epithelial Cell Sheets in Vitro". Journal of Cell Science. 1 (4): 407–413. doi:10.1242/jcs.1.4.407. PMID 5956715.
- Bennett, M. V. L.; Trinkaus, J. P. (1970). "Electrical Coupling Between Embryonic Cells by Way of Extracellular Space and Specialized Junctions". The Journal of Cell Biology. 44 (3): 592–610. doi:10.1083/jcb.44.3.592. PMC 2107981. PMID 5415239.
- Lentz, Thomas L.; Trinkaus, J. P. (1971). "Differentiation of the Junctional Complex of Surface Cells in the Developing Fundulus Blastoderm". The Journal of Cell Biology. 48 (3): 455–472. doi:10.1083/jcb.48.3.455. PMC 2108114. PMID 5545331.
- Trinkaus, J.P. (1973). "Surface activity and locomotion of Fundulus deep cells during blastula and gastrula stages". Developmental Biology. 30 (1): 68–103. doi:10.1016/0012-1606(73)90049-3. PMID 4735370.
- Erickson, C.A.; Trinkaus, J.P. (1976). "Microvilli and blebs as sources of reserve surface membrane during cell spreading". Experimental Cell Research. 99 (2): 375–384. doi:10.1016/0014-4827(76)90595-4. PMID 1269533.
- Betchaku, T.; Trinkaus, J. P. (1978). "Contact relations, surface activity, and cortical microfilaments of marginal cells of the enveloping layer and of the yolk syncytial and yolk cytoplasmic layers of Fundulus before and during epiboly". Journal of Experimental Zoology. 206 (3): 381–426. doi:10.1002/jez.1402060310. PMID 568653.
- Trinkaus, J. P. (1984). "Mechanism of Fundulus Epiboly—A Current View". American Zoologist. 24 (3): 673–688. doi:10.1093/icb/24.3.673. ISSN 0003-1569.
- Keller, R.E.; Trinkaus, J.P. (1987). "Rearrangement of enveloping layer cells without disruption of the epithelial permeability barrier as a factor in Fundulus epiboly". Developmental Biology. 120 (1): 12–24. doi:10.1016/0012-1606(87)90099-6. PMID 3817284.
