= Cytoneme =

Cellular projections that are specialized for exchange of signaling proteins between cells

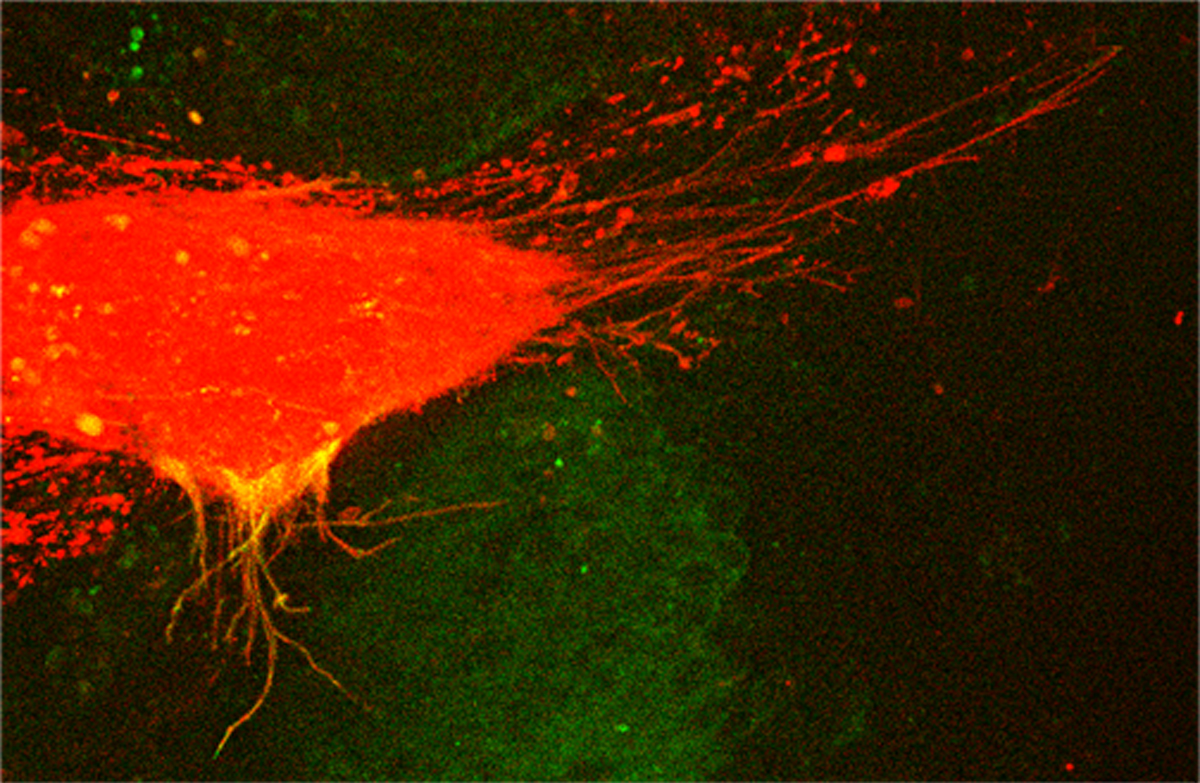
Cytonemes take up and transport morphogens. This micrograph shows tissues from a Drosophila larva whose tracheal cells are marked with membrane-tethered mCherry fluorescent protein. Some of the cytonemes that extend from the tracheal branch contact the underlying wing imaginal disc and transport the Dpp morphogen protein (marked with green fluorescent protein) to the tracheal cells.

Cytonemes are thin, cellular projections that are specialized for exchange of signaling proteins between cells. Cytonemes emanate from cells that make signaling proteins, extending directly to cells that receive signaling proteins. Cytonemes also extend directly from cells that receive signaling proteins to cells that make them.

A cytoneme is a type of filopodium - a thin, tubular extension of a cell's plasma membrane that has a core composed of tightly bundled, parallel actin filaments. Filopodia can extend more than 100 μm and have been measured as thin as 0.1 μm and as thick as 0.5 μm. Cytonemes with a diameter of approximately 0.2 μm and as long as 80 μm have been observed in the Drosophila wing imaginal disc. The term cytoneme was coined to denote the presence of cytoplasm in their interior (cyto-) and their finger-like appearance (-neme), and to distinguish their role as signaling, rather than structural or force-generating, organelles.

Filopodia with behaviors suggestive of roles in sensing patterning information were first observed in sea urchin embryos, and subsequent characterizations support the idea that they convey patterning signals between cells. The discovery of cytonemes in Drosophila imaginal discs correlated for the first time the presence and behavior of filopodia with a known morphogen signaling protein - decapentaplegic. Decapentaplegic is expressed in the wing disc by cells that function as a developmental organizer, and cytonemes that are responsive to decapentaplegic orient toward this developmental organizer. Receptors for signaling proteins are present in motile vesicles in cytonemes, and receptors for different signaling proteins segregate specifically to different types of cytonemes. In Drosophila, cytonemes have been found in wing and eye imaginal discs, trachea, lymph glands and ovaries. They have also been described in spider embryos, earwig ovaries, Rhodnius, Calpodes, earthworms, retroviral-infected cells, mast cells, B-lymphocytes and neutrophils. Recent observations suggest that cytonemes have also an important role during vertebrate development. Recent observations suggest that cytonemes also have an important role during development of the zebrafish neural plate where they transport Wnt8a and of the chick limb where they transport Sonic hedgehog.
