= Richard Gardner (embryologist) =

British embryologist and geneticist

Sir Richard Lavenham Gardner, FRSB, FRS (born 10 June 1943) is a British embryologist and geneticist. He is currently an Emeritus Professor at the University of York, and was previously a Royal Society Research Professor.

Since 1982, he has been Chair of the Royal Society Working Group on human embryo research, stem cells and cloning. He was the President of the Institute of Biology from 2006 to 2008, President of the Institute of Animal Biotechnology from 1986 to 2006 and is currently Chair of Trustees of the Animals in Science – Education Trust.

== Early life and education ==
Gardner was born in Dorking, Surrey. His father, a professional artist specialising in stained glass, was killed a few weeks later during the landings on Sicily. Gardner was educated at St John's School, Leatherhead and later studied Natural Sciences at St Catharine's College, Cambridge before doing a PhD in the University's Physiology Department with Nobel Laureate, Robert Edwards. In 1973 he was appointed to a University Lectureship at Oxford where, from 1978 until his retirement in 2008, he held a Royal Society Research Professorship.

== Scientific career ==
Gardner pioneered the transplantation of cells and tissues between blastocyst stage mouse embryos and their reconstruction from their component tissues. He was the first to apply clonal analysis to study cell fate and potency in mammals, and used this strategy to provide conclusive evidence against early segregation of the mammalian germline. Blastocyst injection was later adopted almost universally for assessing the developmental potential of embryonic stem (ES) cells and their competence to colonise the germline following genetic modification. With Robert Edwards, he also established proof of principle for preimplantation genetic diagnosis.

His main research interests include investigating the fate and deployment of cells in early mammalian development with particular emphasis on clonal analysis, establishing the origin and efficient derivation of stem cells from early embryos, and determining the extent to which pre-patterning normally directs early development in mammals.

For many years, Gardner chaired the Royal Society's ad hoc committee on 'human embryo research', and later its working group on 'stem cells and cloning' and in this role he often advised on the scientific and ethical implications of cloning, attempting to clarify the complexities of the topic for a public audience.

He served as President of the Institute of Animal Technology from 1986 to 2006 and the Institute of Biology (now the Royal Society of Biology) from 2006 to 2008. He is a trustee of the Edwards and Steptoe Research Trust and chair of the Animals in Science Education Trust.

He gave the Cumberland Lodge Annual Lecture in 2010, and the British Fertility Society's Patrick Steptoe Memorial Lecture in 2015..

In 2018, Gardner was awarded The Waddington Medal by the British Society for Developmental Biology, awarded for major contributions to developmental biology in the United Kingdom.

== Selected publications ==
- Gardner, R. L. (9 November 1968). "Mouse Chimaeras obtained by the Injection of Cells into the Blastocyst". Nature. 220 (5167): 596–597. Bibcode:1968Natur.220..596G. doi:10.1038/220596a0. PMID 5686740. S2CID 4198808.
- Gardner, R. L.; Papaioannou, V. E.; Barton, S. C. (1 December 1973). "Origin of the ectoplacental cone and secondary giant cells in mouse blastocysts reconstituted from isolated trophoblast and inner cell mass". Journal of Embryology and Experimental Morphology. 30 (3): 561–572. ISSN 0022-0752. PMID 4772385.
- Gardner, R. L.; Barton, S. C.; Surani, M. A. (1 October 1990). "Use of triple tissue blastocyst reconstitution to study the development of diploid parthenogenetic primitive ectoderm in combination with fertilization-derived trophectoderm and primitive endoderm". Genetical Research. 56 (2–3): 209–222. doi:10.1017/s001667230003531x. PMID 2272512.
- Gardner, R.L. and Lyon, M.F. (1971). X-chromosome inactivation studied by injection of a single cell into the mouse blastocyst. Nature 231, 385-386.
- Gardner, R.L., Lyon, M.F., Evans, E.P. and Burtenshaw, M.D. (1985). Clonal analysis of X-chromosome inactivation and the origin of the germ line in the mouse embryo. J. Embryol. exp. Morph., 88, 349–363.
- Gardner, R.L. and Edwards, R.G. (1968). Control of the sex ratio at full term in the rabbit by transferring sexed blastocysts. Nature 218, 346–348.
- Gardner, R.L. (1985). Clonal analysis of early mammalian development. Phil. Trans. R. Soc, B; 312, 163–178.
- Gardner, R.L. and Cockroft, D.L. (1998). Complete dissipation of coherent clonal growth occurs before gastrulation in the precursor tissue of the fetus in the mouse. Development. 125,2397–2402.
- Brook, F.A. and Gardner, R.L. (1997). The origin and efficient derivation of embryonic stem cells in the mouse. Proc. Nat. Acad. Sci. 94, 5709–5712.
- Gardner, R. L. (2001) Specification of embryonic axes begins before cleavage in normal mouse development. Development 128, 839–847.
- Gardner, R. L. (2007) The axis of polarity of the mouse blastocyst is specified before blastulation and independently of the zona pellucida. Hum. Reprod. 22, 798–806.
- Gardner, R. L. (2010) Normal bias in the direction of fetal rotation depends on blastomere compositionduring early cleavage in the mouse. PLOS ONE 5, 1–5

== Awards and honours ==
- 1977 – Zoological Society of London's Scientific Medal
- 1979 – Elected Fellow of The Royal Society
- 1999 – March of Dimes Prize in Developmental Biology
- 2001 – Royal Society's Royal Medal
- 2004 – Albert Brachet Prize of the Belgian Royal Academy of Sciences, Letters and Fine Arts
- 2005 – Knighthood for services to Biological Sciences
- 2012 – Honorary Doctorate of Science, University of Cambridge
