= Michael Akam =

British zoologist and developmental biologist (born 1952)

Michael Akam FRS
- Born: Michael Edwin Akam; 19 June 1952 (age 74); Bromley, Kent, England
- Education: University of Cambridge; University of Oxford
- Known for: Research on Hox genes, arthropod development, segmentation, evolutionary developmental biology
- Awards: Fellow of the Royal Society (2000)
- Scientific career
- Fields: Zoology, developmental biology, evolutionary developmental biology
- Workplaces: University of Cambridge; University Museum of Zoology, Cambridge
- Doctoral advisor: David Roberts

Michael Edwin Akam FRS (born 19 June 1952) is a British zoologist and developmental biologist whose work has focused on the genetic control of animal body patterning, especially the role of Hox genes in insects and other arthropods. He has been associated with the University of Cambridge for most of his career, serving as Director of the University Museum of Zoology, Cambridge, Head of the Department of Zoology, and 1866 Professor of Zoology. He was elected a Fellow of the Royal Society in 2000.

== Early life and education ==
Akam was born in Bromley, Kent, on 19 June 1952. He studied zoology at the University of Cambridge, graduating with first-class honours in 1974. He then undertook doctoral research at the University of Oxford in the laboratory of David Roberts, studying larval serum proteins in Drosophila melanogaster.

From 1979 to 1981 he was a Damon Runyon Fellow at Stanford University, where he worked in the laboratory of David Hogness during the early molecular characterization of the bithorax complex and other developmental control genes later recognised as Hox genes.

== Research and career ==
Akam returned to Cambridge in 1982 and established his independent research programme in the Department of Genetics, where he worked alongside Michael Ashburner and others on developmental genetics in Drosophila. In 1989 he became a founding member of the Wellcome/CRC Institute for Cancer and Developmental Biology, later the Gurdon Institute.

In 1997 he was appointed Director of the University Museum of Zoology, Cambridge, combining museum leadership with laboratory research. He became Professor of Zoology in 1997, then succeeded to the historic 1866 Professorship of Zoology in 2010. From 2010 to 2016 he served as Head of the Department of Zoology. He is also a Fellow of Darwin College, Cambridge.

Akam's laboratory made important contributions to understanding how Hox genes specify segment identity along the anterior–posterior axis of animals. His early work demonstrated spatially restricted expression of bithorax-complex genes in Drosophila embryos, linking gene expression domains with homeotic transformations. He later extended comparative studies to crustaceans, insects, myriapods and annelids, helping establish evolutionary developmental biology as a distinct field.

Later research from his group examined the evolution of segmentation mechanisms in arthropods, especially centipedes and other non-model species, and the diversification of developmental gene networks outside Drosophila.

== Awards and honours ==
- Fellow of the American Association for the Advancement of Science (2006)
- Waddington Medal of the British Society for Developmental Biology (2005)
- Fellow of the Royal Society (2000)
- Fellow of the Linnean Society of London (1999)
- Alexander Kowalevsky Medal (2007 award; presented 2008)

== Selected publications ==
- Akam, M. (1998). "Hox genes, homeosis and the evolution of segment identity: no need for hopeless monsters." The International Journal of Developmental Biology 42(3): 445–451.
- Akam, M. (2000). "Arthropods: developmental diversity within a (super) phylum." Proceedings of the National Academy of Sciences of the United States of America 97(9): 4438–4441.
- Peel, A. D.; Chipman, A. D.; Akam, M. (2005). "Arthropod segmentation: beyond the Drosophila paradigm." Nature Reviews Genetics 6(12): 905–916.
- Pavlopoulos, A.; Akam, M. (2007). "Hox go omics: insights from Drosophila into Hox gene targets." Genome Biology 8(3): 208.
- Clark, E.; Peel, A. D.; Akam, M. (2019). "Arthropod segmentation." Development 146(18): dev170480.
