= Current Neurology and Neuroscience Reports =

- Discipline: Neuroscience, neurology
- Language: English
- Edited by: Stanley Fahn, John C. M. Brust

Publication details
- History: 2001-present
- Publisher: Springer Science+Business Media
- Frequency: Monthly
- Impact factor: 6.020 (2021)

Standard abbreviations
- ISO 4: Curr. Neurol. Neurosci. Rep.

Indexing
- CODEN: CNNRBS
- ISSN: 1528-4042 (print); 1534-6293 (web)
- LCCN: 00211514
- OCLC no.: 43379696

Links
- Journal homepage; Online archive

Current Neurology and Neuroscience Reports is a monthly peer-reviewed medical journal covering research in neurology and neuroscience. It is published by Springer Science+Business Media and the editors-in-chief are Stanley Fahn and John C. M. Brust (Columbia University College of Physicians and Surgeons).

== Abstracting an indexing ==
The journal is abstracted and indexed in:

- Science Citation Index Expanded
- PubMed/MEDLINE
- Scopus
- EMBASE
- Chemical Abstracts Service
- Academic OneFile

According to the Journal Citation Reports, the journal has a 2021 impact factor of 6.030.
