= North American Vascular Biology Organization =

American non-profit health organization

North American Vascular Biology Organization (NAVBO)
- Founded: 1994
- Type: Nonprofit
- Headquarters: 18501 Kingshill Rd. Germantown, MD; United States
- Location: United States
- Key people: Cynthia St. Hilaire (president)
- Website: navbo.org

The North American Vascular Biology Organization (NAVBO) is a scientific society promoting knowledge exchange in the area of vascular biology. The society organizes several international scientific meetings annually which broadly cover the areas of development of blood and lymphatic vasculature, cardiovascular and lymphatic disease, vascular matrix biology and vascular bioengineering.

== History ==
The North American Vascular Biology Organization was founded in 1994 as a non-profit scientific organization with voluntary membership. Since its inception, the organization has welcomed members from various disciplines interested in vascular biology.

The inaugural president was Michael Gimbrone from Brigham & Women's Hospital, Harvard Medical School, who served from 1994 to 1995. He was succeeded by Stephen Schwartz from the University of Washington, who held the position from 1995 to 1996 before his death.

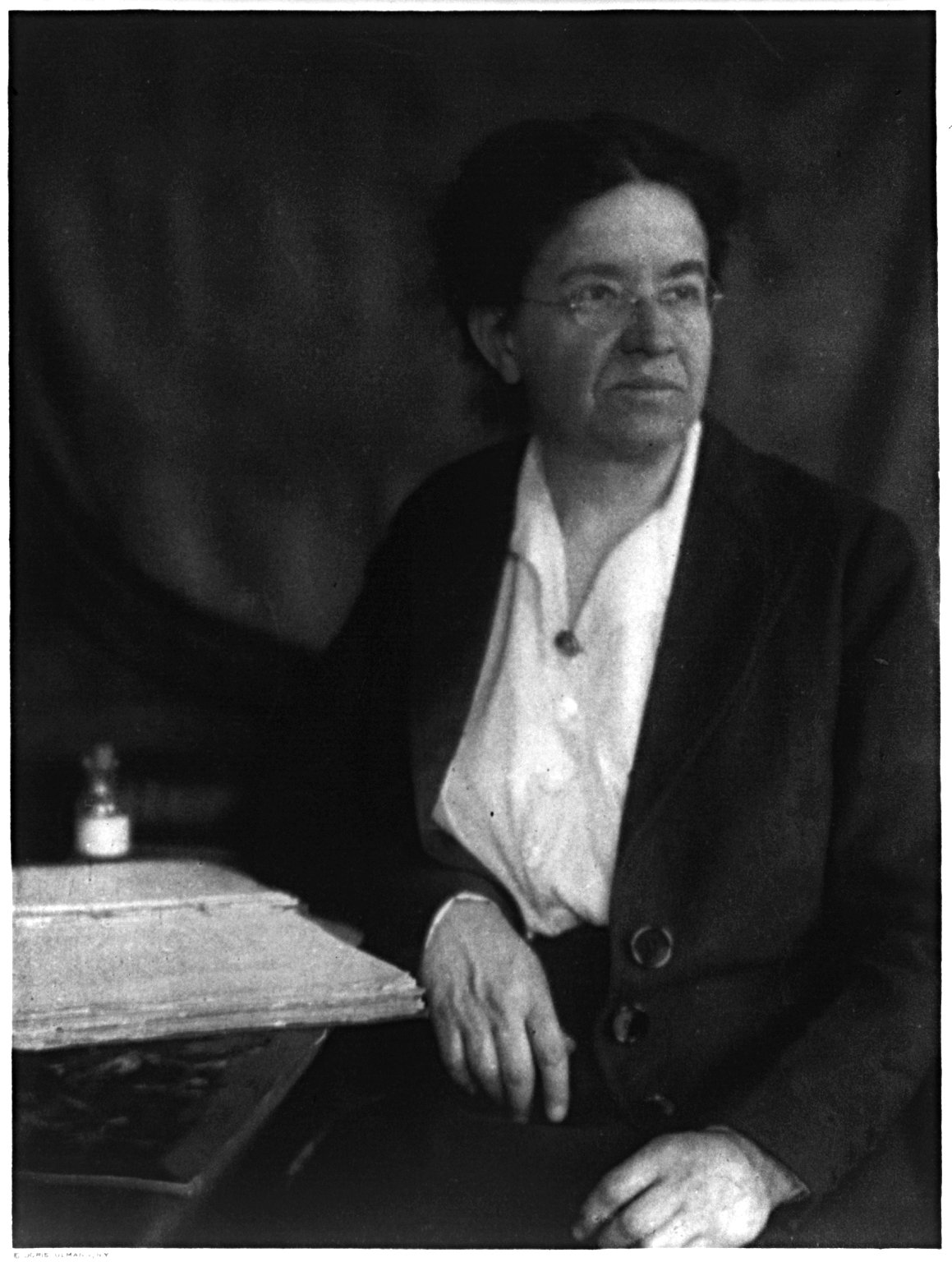
Florence R. Sabin

== Recognizing achievements in vascular biology ==
NAVBO offers several awards to recognize excellence and achievement in vascular biology, including awards for independent investigators as well as travel awards. These honors include the Stephen Schwartz Award, the Florence Sabin Award (named in honor of Dr. Florence Sabin), the Judah Folkman Award (in honor of Judah Folkman), the Earl P. Benditt Award (honoring Earl P. Benditt), and the Springer Junior Investigator Award.
