= Christine Holt =

British developmental neuroscientist

Christine Holt CBE FRS FMedSci
- Born: Christine Elizabeth Holt; 28 August 1954 (age 72)
- Education: BSc in biological sciences, University of Sussex; PhD in zoology, King's College, London University
- Spouse: W.A. Harris
- Awards: Elected Member of EMBO (2005), Fellow of the Academy of Medical Sciences (2007), Fellow of the Royal Society (2009), Remedios Caro Almela Prize in Developmental Neurobiology (2011), Champalimaud Foundation Vision Award (2016), Rosenstiel Award (2022), Kavli Prize (2026)
- Scientific career
- Fields: Neuroscience
- Workplaces: Professor of Developmental Neuroscience, University of Cambridge
- Website: http://www.pdn.cam.ac.uk/staff/holt/index.shtml

Christine Elizabeth Holt (born 28 August 1954) is a British developmental neuroscientist.

She has been Professor of Developmental Neuroscience, University of Cambridge, since 2003 and a Fellow of Gonville and Caius College, Cambridge University, since 1997.

Holt is best known for her work in understanding the "basic mechanisms that govern how the vertebrate brain becomes wired up in the highly specific and complex way that it does." In 2009, she was part of an international team that received a Human Frontiers Science Program grant to develop molecular probes that will help researchers better understand the "cellular GPS" system that guides neurons to create a properly wired nervous system." Her research provides leads for future therapies for nerve damage and neurodevelopmental disorders.

== Scientific career ==
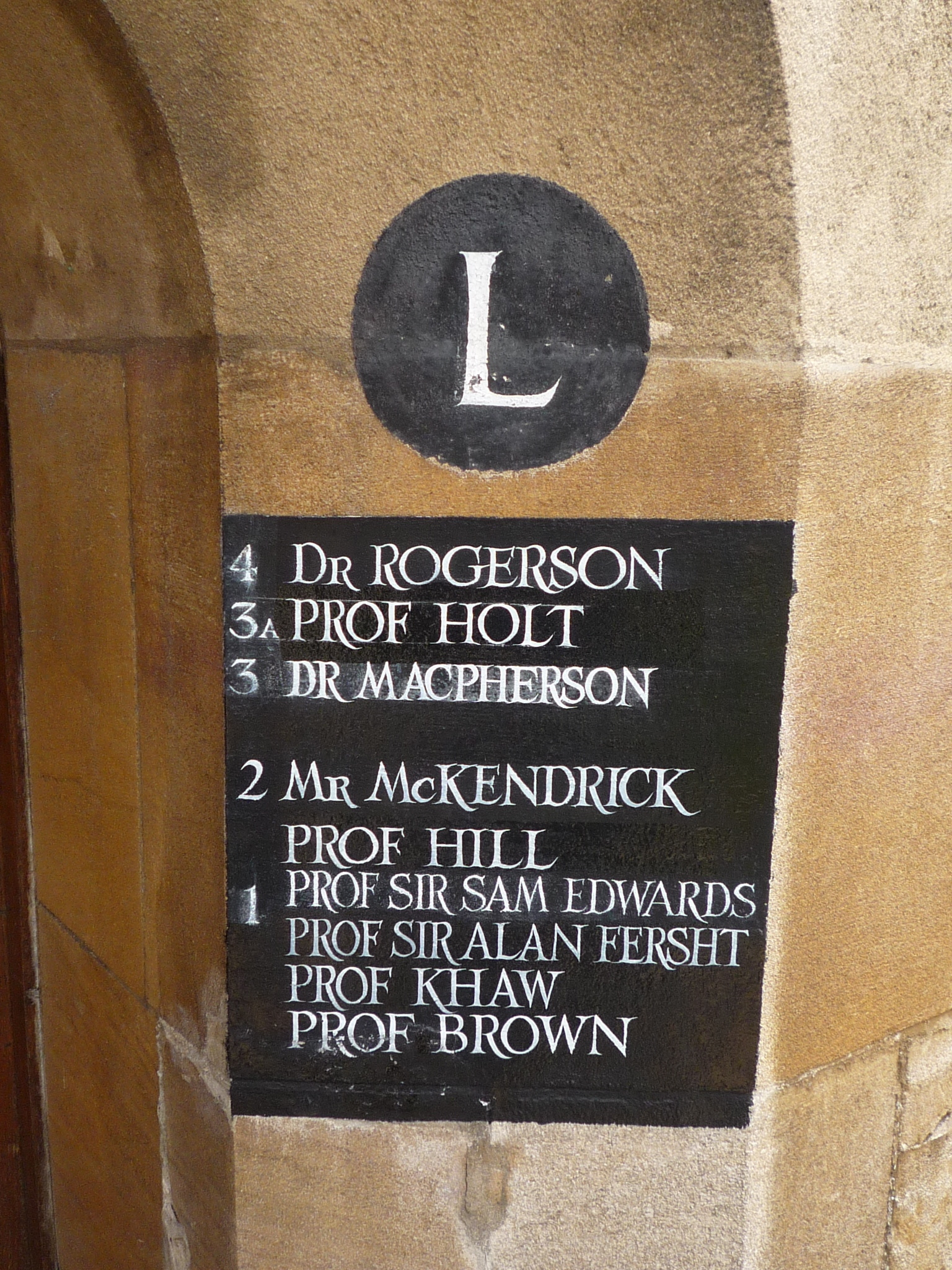
Holt's name on Staircase L at Gonville & Caius College, Cambridge, in 2010

In 1977, Holt received her Bachelor of Science (Honors) in biological sciences from the University of Sussex. She did her doctoral work under the mentorship of John Scholes at King's College London, receiving her Ph.D. in zoology in 1982.

From 1982 to 1986, she was a postdoctoral fellow in the Physiology Department at Oxford University and the Biology Department of the University of California San Diego (UCSD) under the mentorship W.A. Harris and Colin Blakemore. In 1986, she became an assistant research biologist and lecturer at UCSD, where she continued to study the frog visual system in its early embryonic period. She received a McKnight Scholar Award for this work in 1986 and an Alexander von Humboldt award in 1987.

She joined the faculty at UCSD in 1989. During this period, she studied the mechanism in which cells from the retina grow towards and make connections with specific brain cells, performing experiments to understand the role of adhesion molecules in axon guidance. Specifically, she assessed the loss of N-cadherin and integrins, two of the three types of adhesion molecules, on the embryonic brain. In 1991, she was named a Pew Scholar.

In 1997, she moved to Gonville & Caius College at the University of Cambridge. In 2003, she became a Professor of Developmental Neuroscience in the Department of Physiology, Development and Neuroscience, the position she still holds today. She was elected a member of the European Molecular Biology Organization in 2005, a fellow of the Academy of Medical Sciences in 2007, and fellow of the Royal Society in 2009. In 2011, she was awarded the Remedios Caro Almela Prize for Research in Developmental Neurobiology. In 2016, she was part of a team awarded the António Champalimaud Vision Award, along with John Flanagan of Harvard Medical School, Carol A. Mason of Columbia University, Carla Shatz of Stanford University. In 2017, Professor Holt was awarded the Ferrier Medal and Lecture by the Royal Society "for pioneering understanding of the key molecular mechanisms involved in nerve growth, guidance and targeting which has revolutionised our knowledge of growing axon tip." In 2022 she received the Rosenstiel Award, and in 2023 The Brain Prize. In 2026 she was awarded the Kavli Prize in the category of "Neurosciences".

Christine Holt was elected Member of the National Academy of Sciences in April 2020.

== Research ==
Holt's early career was spent studying cell movement during eye development in the frog visual system. Her seminal dissertation work was published in Nature 1980. Much of what we currently know about the cellular and molecular mechanisms involved in establishing and sculpting the patterns of retinal projections comes from the work of Holt and her colleagues.

Today, her research interests continue to lie in the mechanisms of axon guidance and synaptic specificity in the development of complex brain networks. Holt is credited as the pioneer of the idea that proteins synthesize and degenerate at a local level in an axon's cone of growth. This process is required for accuracy in brain cell growth proper orientation. In addition to studying N-cadherin and integrins, she has also investigated the role of ephrins in axon growth and the formation of the optic chiasm. In addition, her studies have found that netrin-1, DCC, and laminin-1 are key players in axon guidance from the retina. For example, netrin-1 is both a chemoattractant and a chemorepellent for many classes of axons, and Holt's 1997 study shows that the growth cone of spinal neurons is chemoattractive to netrin-1 yet chemorepulsive when cAMP is present. Currently, Holt collaborates with the lab of Giovanni Armenise at Harvard University, focusing on the role of microRNAs and non-coding RNAs in axon regrowth and wiring, and as a possible link to cancer of the nervous system.

== Personal life ==
Holt is married to W.A. Harris (FRS). Beyond teaching and research, she listed her other interests as “wildlife, walking, music, family”.
