= French flag model =

Biological model

Model of concentration gradient building up; fine yellow-orange outlines are cell boundaries.

The diffusion of a morphogen in an elongated compartment. The three colors blue, white and red represent three concentration ranges of the initial morphogen, which can then activate three genes in a differentiated manner, and thus be at the origin of three different parts of the organism.

The French flag model is a conceptual definition of a morphogen, described by Lewis Wolpert in the 1960s. A morphogen is defined as a signaling molecule that acts directly on cells (not through serial induction) to produce specific cellular responses dependent on morphogen concentration. During early development, morphogen gradients generate different cell types in distinct spatial order. French flag patterning is often found in combination with others: vertebrate limb development is one of the many phenotypes exhibiting French flag patterning overlapped with a complementary pattern (in this case Turing pattern).

== Overview ==
In the French flag model, the French flag is used to represent the effect of a morphogen on cell differentiation: a morphogen affects cell states based on concentration, these states are represented by the different colors of the French flag: high concentrations activate a "blue" gene, lower concentrations activate a "white" gene, with "red" serving as the default state in cells below the necessary concentration threshold.

The French flag model was championed by the leading Drosophila biologist, Peter Lawrence. Christiane Nüsslein-Volhard identified the first morphogen, Bicoid, one of the transcription factors present in a gradient in the Drosophila syncytial embryo. Two labs, that of Gary Struhl and that of Stephen Cohen, then demonstrated that a secreted signaling protein, Decapentaplegic (the Drosophila homologue of transforming growth factor beta), acted as a morphogen during later stages of Drosophila development. The substance governs the pattern of tissue development and, in particular, the positions of the various specialized cell types within a tissue. It spreads from a localized source and forms a concentration gradient across a developing tissue.

Well-known morphogens include: decapentaplegic/transforming growth factor beta, Hedgehog/Sonic hedgehog, Wingless/Wnt, epidermal growth factor, and fibroblast growth factor.

Some of the earliest and best-studied morphogens are transcription factors that diffuse within early Drosophila melanogaster (fruit fly) embryos. However, most morphogens are secreted proteins that signal between cells.

Morphogens are defined conceptually, not chemically, so simple chemicals such as retinoic acid may also act as morphogens.

== Difficulties ==
The basis of the French flag model is the idea that a morphogen autonomously forms a gradient with individual cells reading the concentration of the gradient. Cells then respond to a specific level of gradient with a specific differentiation to match the position the gradient indicates they are in. While widely accepted as an important model for understanding morphogenesis, it is not universally accepted by all developmental biologists. The difficulties with all gradient based models of morphogenesis were extensively reviewed by Natalie and Richard Gordon and include seven specific points:

1. In order to maintain a gradient at steady state there has to be a sink i.e. a way in which diffusing molecules are destroyed or removed along the way and/or at some boundaries. Sinks are rarely, if ever, even considered when the gradient model is invoked.
2. Diffusion must occur in a confined space if a gradient is to be established. However, many organisms such as the axolotl develop normally even if the vitelline membrane and jelly layers are removed and development occurs in flowing water.
3. Diffusion is temperature dependent yet development can proceed normally over a wide variety of temperatures in animals whose eggs develop external to the mother.
4. Diffusion gradients do not scale well yet embryos come in variety of sizes.
5. Diffusion gradients follow the superposition principle. This means that a gradient of one substance in one direction, and a gradient of the same substance in a perpendicular direction, result in a single one-dimensional gradient in the diagonal direction, not a two dimensional gradient. Developmental biologists frequently invoke a two dimensional gradient even though a two dimensional gradient system requires two morphogen gradients with two different sources and sinks placed approximately perpendicular to one another.
6. Fluctuations in gradients always occur, especially at the low concentrations commonly found during embryogenesis, making a specific response by an individual cell to particular concentration thresholds problematic.
7. Each cell has to be able to “read” the morphogen concentration accurately, otherwise boundaries between tissues become ragged. Yet such ragged boundaries are rare in development.
