= Earl P. Benditt =

American pathologist (1916–1996)

Earl Philip Benditt (April 15, 1916 – May 27, 1996) was an American pathologist, known for his research on hardening of the arteries. Benditt was a member of the National Academy of Sciences. Benditt published approximately 250 scientific papers. Benditt was a fellow of the American Association for the Advancement of Science and was a recipient of the Rous-Whipple Award as well as the Gold-Headed Cane from the American Association of Pathologists and Bacteriologists. Benditt was the Chair of the Department of Pathology at the University of Washington from 1957 to 1981. The National Academies Press called him "a preeminent twentieth-century experimental pathologist". The New York Times called him "a specialist in blood vessel and artery diseases".

== Life and career ==
Benditt was born in Philadelphia, Pennsylvania. He graduated from Swarthmore College in 1937, and then received M.D. from Harvard Medical School in 1941. He then worked in the faculty of the University of Chicago. In 1957 Benditt accepted a position of professor of pathology and the department chairman at the University of Washington.
