= Lewis Wolpert =

British biologist (1929–2021)

Lewis Wolpert CBE FRS FRSL FMedSci
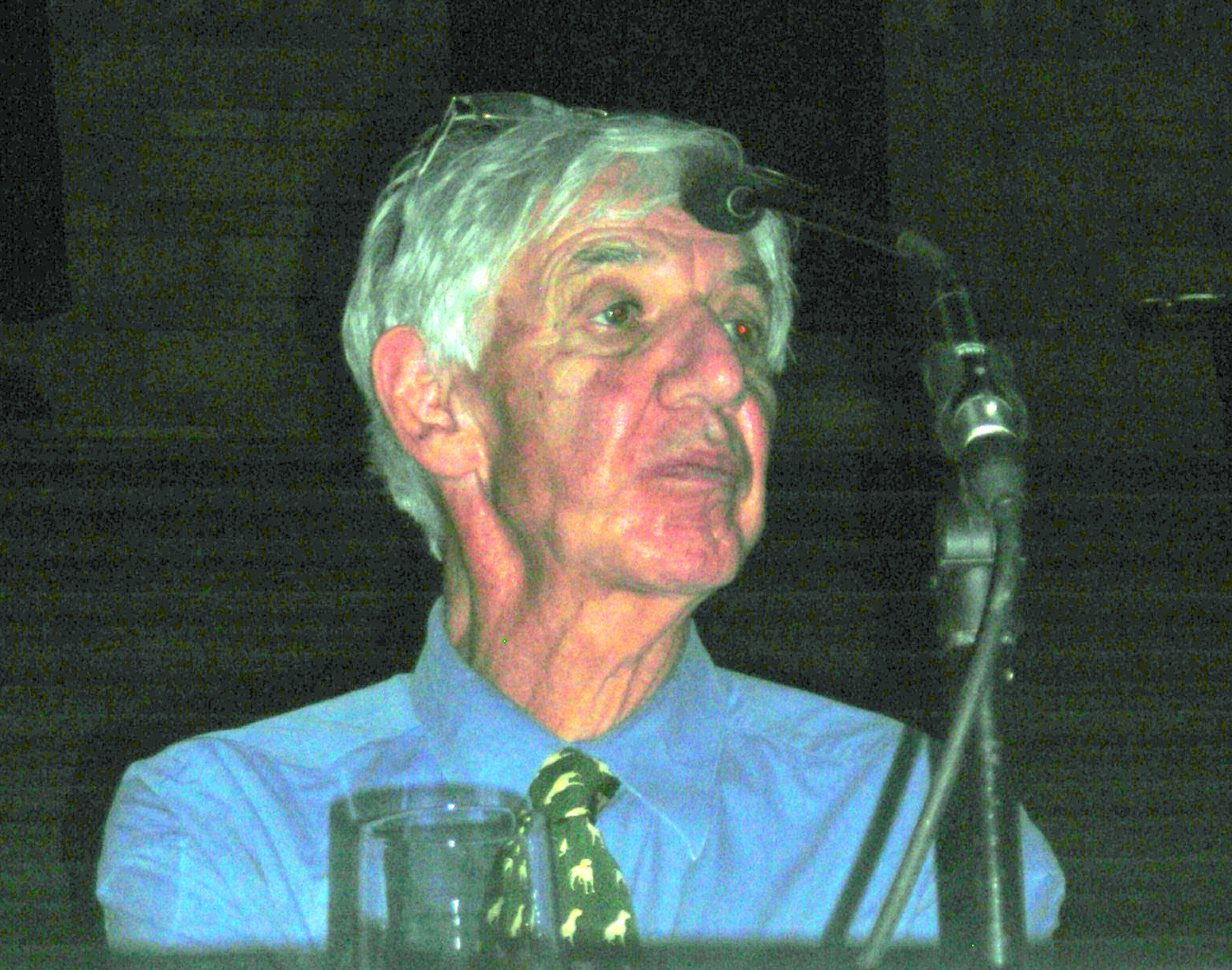
- Born: 19 October 1929; Johannesburg, South Africa
- Died: 28 January 2021 (aged 91); London, England
- Education: University of Witwatersrand (BSc); Imperial College London; King's College London (PhD)
- Known for: Positional-value concept in biological development French flag model
- Children: Daniel Mark Wolpert, Miranda Wolpert
- Relatives: Helen Suzman (aunt)
- Awards: Hamburger prize for education – American Soc.Dev.Biol. Michael Faraday Prize (2000); Royal Medal (2018)
- Scientific career
- Fields: Developmental biology
- Workplaces: University College London (Emeritus Professor of Cell and Developmental Biology)
- Doctoral advisor: James Danielli
- Doctoral students: Jim Smith
- Website: www.ucl.ac.uk/cdb/research/wolpert

Lewis Wolpert (19 October 1929 – 28 January 2021) was a South African-born British developmental biologist, author, and broadcaster. Wolpert popularized his French flag model of embryonic development, using the colours of the French flag as a visual aid to explain how embryonic cells interpret genetic code for expressing characteristics of living organisms and explaining how signalling between cells early in morphogenesis could inform cells with the same genetic regulatory network of their position and role.

He wrote several science books, including: Triumph of the Embryo (1991), Malignant Sadness (1999), Six Impossible Things Before Breakfast: the Evolutionary Origins of Belief (2006), and How We Live And Why We Die: The Secret Lives of Cells (2009).

== Early life ==
Wolpert was born on 19 October 1929, in Johannesburg to Sarah (née Suzman) and William Wolpert in a South African Jewish family of Lithuanian Jewish origin. His father was a bookshop manager and newsagent. His aunt, Helen Suzman, was a South African anti-apartheid activist and politician.

He completed his BSc in civil engineering at the University of Witwatersrand in Johannesburg where he was exposed to progressive politics and communist ideas, and met Nelson Mandela in 1952. He worked as an assistant to the director of Building Research Institute, Pretoria, before going to Israel and working for the Water Planning Board. He went on to study soil mechanics at Imperial College London and later completed his doctorate from King's College London under biophysicist James Danielli.

== Career and research ==
Wolpert shifted focus from applying his knowledge of soil mechanics to studying the science of dividing cells on the recommendation of a friend in South Africa. Partnering with Trygve Gustafson he worked toward measuring the mechanical forces in cellular division. He served as a lecturer and then a reader in King's College London. He went on to hold the position of Emeritus Professor of Biology as Applied to Medicine in the Department of Anatomy and Developmental Biology at University College London until his retirement at 74. Wolpert was elected to the American Philosophical Society in 2002.

=== French flag model ===
Wolpert was best known for the French flag model of embryonic development, which he put forward in a 1969 paper titled Positional Information and the Spatial Pattern of Cellular Differentiation in the Journal of Theoretical Biology. The model uses the French tricolor flag to visually depict how embryonic cells interpret genetic code to create the same patterns, even when some pieces of the embryo are removed. The model further explains how signalling between cells early in morphogenesis could be used to inform cells with the same genetic regulatory network of their position and role. The model was based on Wolpert's research on sea urchin eggs and provided a framework for research into gastrulation, the embryonic process during which a living organism's body plan is established. Wolpert is credited with the quote: "It is not birth, marriage, or death, but gastrulation which is truly the most important time in your life."

Biologists recognise Wolpert for elaborating and championing the ideas of positional information and positional value: molecular signals and internal cellular responses to them that enable cells to do the right thing in the right place during embryonic development. The essence of these concepts is that there is a dedicated set of molecules for spatial co-ordination of cells, identical across many species and across different developmental stages and tissues. The discovery of Hox gene codes in flies and vertebrates has largely vindicated Wolpert's positional-value concept, while identification of growth-factor morphogens in many species has supported the concept of positional information.

=== Ideas ===
In a 2005 article entitled "Spiked", The Guardian asked a series of scientists "What is the one thing everyone should learn about science?" Wolpert responded:

I would teach the world that science is the best way to understand the world, and that for any set of observations, there is only one correct explanation. Also, science is value-free, as it explains the world as it is. Ethical issues arise only when science is applied to technology – from medicine to industry.

Of his book How We Live & Why We Die: The Secret Lives of Cells, Wolpert said the intended audience of his book was the general public. He said he thought the general public needed to understand that people are a society of cells, particularly if they wanted to understand humans. Wolpert also believed that one very important, and so far unsolved, question in cellular research is the origins and evolution of the first cell, as well as the question of cell behaviour, which in his opinion would be useful for the study of illnesses such as cancer or Alzheimer's disease.

Wolpert debated with Christian philosopher William Lane Craig about the existence of God, Christian astrophysicist Hugh Ross on whether there is a case for a creator, and William Dembski on the topic of intelligent design. In a lecture entitled "Is Science Dangerous?" he expanded on this, saying: "I regard it as ethically unacceptable and impractical to censor any aspect of trying to understand the nature of our world."

On 25 May 1994, Wolpert conducted an hour-long interview with Francis Crick called "How the Brain 'sees'" for The Times Dillon Science Forum; Just Results Video Productions produced a video of the interview for The Times. On 15 January 2004, Wolpert and biologist/parapsychologist Rupert Sheldrake engaged in a live debate on the evidence for telepathy, held at the Royal Society of Arts in London. Wolpert disagreed with Sheldrake on the possibility of simulating a cell or an embryo on a computer, which Wolpert believed would be attainable within 20 years. He stated that he believed doing so would predict in detail how the cell will behave, although he also admitted to the difficulty of this task due to the complex networks of proteins, protein-to-protein interactions, and the vast amount of molecules in the cell.

In addition to his scientific and research publications, he wrote about his own experience of clinical depression in Malignant Sadness: The Anatomy of Depression (1999). He presented three television programmes based on that book and entitled A Living Hell on BBC2. He was made a Fellow of the Royal Society in 1980 and awarded the CBE in 1990. He became a Fellow of the Royal Society of Literature in 1999 and one of the first Fellows of the Academy of Medical Sciences in 1998. He served as a vice-president of Humanists UK. In 1986 Wolpert was invited to deliver the Royal Institution Christmas Lecture on Frankenstein's Quest: Development of Life. In 2015, Wolpert was awarded The Waddington Medal by the British Society for Developmental Biology for his major contributions to developmental biology. In 2018 he received the Royal Medal. Wolpert was chair of the Committee on the Public Understanding of Science between 1994 and 1998. He was the recipient of the Michael Faraday Medal and Prize for science communication from the Royal Society in 2000.

He dismissed bioethical concerns about human cloning and embryo research, though he had stated a position against human cloning saying, "the child would almost certainly be ill or be abnormal". He was an atheist and took part in public debates about science and religion, though he admitted that some people benefit from religious experiences. He was the vice-president of the British Humanist Association. He was also a lifelong friend of the fellow South African and author Jillian Becker, editor of the Atheist Conservative.

== Books and media ==
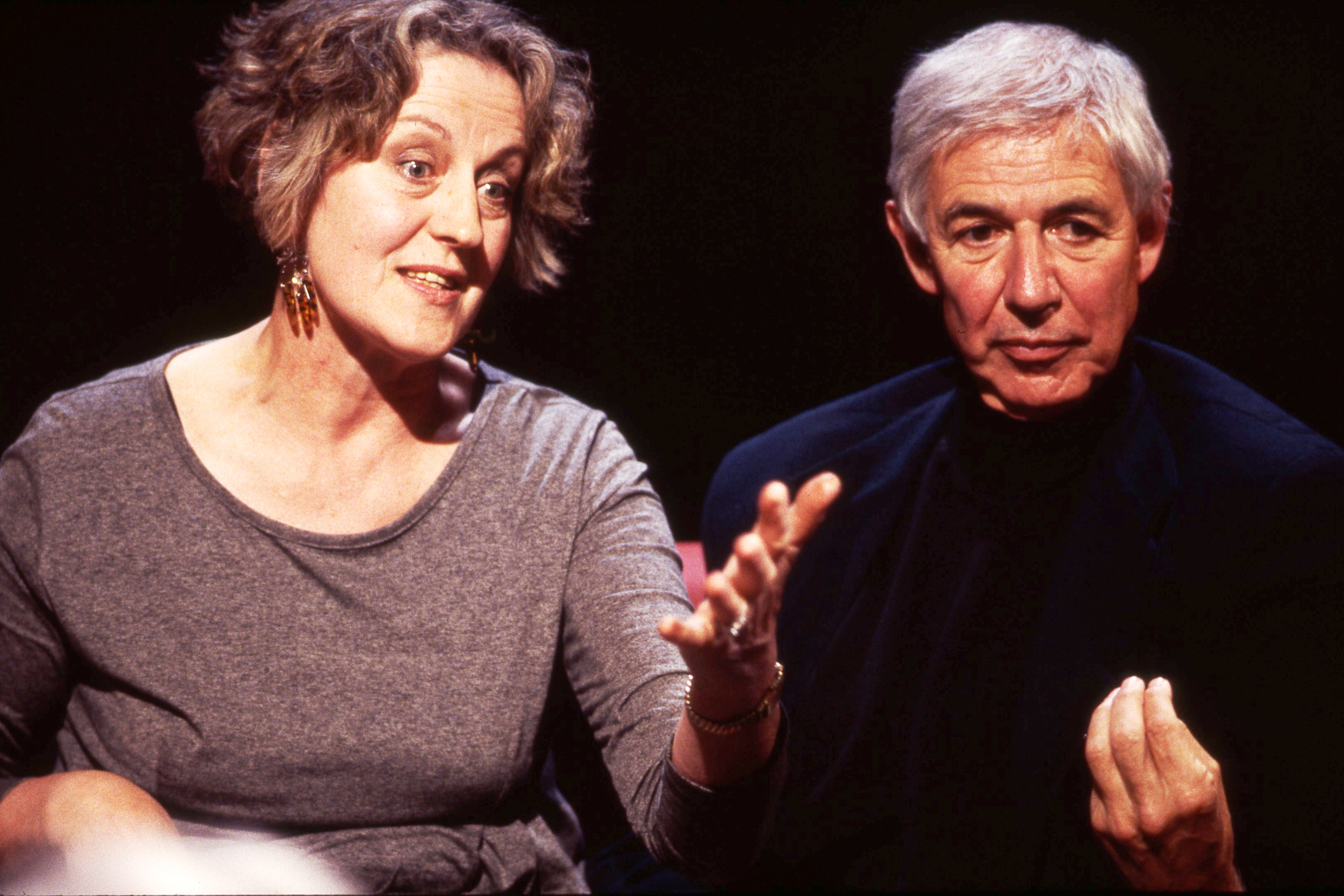
Appearing with Germaine Greer on After Dark in 1994

In the early 1980s, he began broadcasting on BBC Radio 3 and Radio 4 as a science commentator, with his broadcast conversations with scientists published as A Passion for Science (1988). He went on to write a number of popular science books, including The Unnatural Nature of Science (1994), Six Impossible Things Before Breakfast: The Evolutionary Origins of Belief (2006), Triumph of the Embryo (1991) and How We Live And Why We Die: The Secret Lives of Cells (2009). His book Malignant Sadness (1999) explored his own experiences with clinical depression at the age of 65.

In 2011, Wolpert published You're Looking Very Well, a book on the social and scientific aspects of aging. The book was withdrawn from sale by its publisher in 2014 after being found to contain numerous passages copied without attribution from the scientific literature and from various websites, including Wikipedia. Publication of Wolpert's upcoming book, Why Can't a Woman Be More Like a Man?, was also delayed after passages of that book were found to be copied without attribution. Wolpert apologised and took responsibility for the errors with the explanation "totally inadvertent and due to carelessness".

== Personal life ==
Wolpert married his first wife Elizabeth Brownstein in 1961 in a marriage that ended in divorce. He later married the Australian writer Jill Neville and they remained married until Neville's death from cancer in 1997. He married Alison Hawkes in 2016 and the couple remained married until his death. Wolpert had four children including Miranda Wolpert and Daniel Wolpert, professors in neuroscience and clinical psychology, from his first marriage, and two stepchildren.

On 28 January 2021, Wolpert died at University College Hospital in London from COVID-19-related complications, during the COVID-19 pandemic in England.

== Publications ==
- Wolpert, Lewis; Richards, Alison (1988). A Passion for Science. Oxford, U.K: Oxford University Press. ISBN 0-19-854213-5.
- Wolpert, Lewis (1991). The Triumph of the Embryo. Oxford, UK & New York: Oxford University Press. ISBN 0-19-854243-7.
- Wolpert, Lewis; Horton, Richard (1993). "The Unnatural Nature of Science". The Lancet. 341 (8840): 310. doi:10.1016/0140-6736(93)92665-G. PMID 8093949. S2CID 44724752.
- Wolpert, L. (1993). The unnatural nature of science. Cambridge, Mass: Harvard University Press. ISBN 0-674-92980-2.
- Wolpert, Lewis (1999). Malignant Sadness: The Anatomy of Depression. New York: Free Press. ISBN 0-684-87058-4.
- Wolpert, Lewis; Tickle, Cheryll (2011). Principles of development. Oxford New York: Oxford University Press. ISBN 978-0-19-955428-7.
- Wolpert, Lewis (2006). Six impossible things before breakfast, The evolutionary origins of belief. W.W. Norton. ISBN 0-393-06449-2.
- Wolpert, Lewis (2009). How We Live and Why We Die: The secret lives of cells, Norton. Faber & Faber. ISBN 978-0571239122.
- Wolpert, Lewis (2011). You're Looking Very Well: The Surprising Nature of Getting Old. Faber & Faber. ISBN 978-0571250653.

=== Other ===
- Flora McDonnell, ed., Threads of Hope: Learning to Live with Depression (Short Books, 2003, ISBN 978-1-904095-35-4), with contributions by Lewis Wolpert, Margaret Drabble, Wendy Cope, Andrew Solomon, Virginia Ironside, Alastair Campbell, and Kay Redfield Jamison.
