= Rüdiger Bieler =

German-American biologist

- Born: 1955 (age 70–71); Hamburg, Germany
- Education: PhD, University of Hamburg, 1985
- Occupation: Biologist
- Years active: 1978 - present
- Known for: Research on the evolution and systematics of invertebrate animals, especially mollusks

Rüdiger Bieler (born 1955 in Hamburg, Germany) is a German-American biologist whose primary scientific field of study is malacology, the study of mollusks.

== Training and career ==
Bieler studied biology, geography, and biology education at the University of Hamburg (Germany), where he held a scholarship of the Studienstiftung. After extensive field research in South Africa (with Richard Kilburn) he received a PhD (DSc) degree in Zoology in 1985 under Otto Kraus. Following several postdoctoral research fellowships under the mentorship of Richard S. Houbrick and Mary E. Rice (Smithsonian Institution) at the National Museum of Natural History (1985-1986), the Smithsonian Marine Station at Fort Pierce, Florida (1986-1987), and a NATO postdoctoral fellowship (1987-1988, also at the Smithsonian Marine Station), he became Curator of Malacology at the Delaware Museum of Natural History. Since 1990, he is a Curator of Invertebrate Zoology at the Field Museum of Natural History in Chicago (following predecessors Fritz Haas and Alan Solem). He also is a faculty member of the Committee of Evolutionary Biology of the University of Chicago.

== Research ==
Much of Bieler's taxonomic research work has focused on marine gastropods (sea snails), especially on sundials (Architectonicidae) and worm-snails (Vermetidae). His evolutionary studies first concentrated on Gastropoda and later extended to Bivalvia and included the earliest application of computer-assisted phylogenetic (cladistic) analyses in that group. He was the lead author on a revised classification for all bivalves, see Taxonomy of the Bivalvia (Bouchet, Rocroi, Bieler, Carter & Coan, 2010), and on major work providing a new hypotheses of the branching pattern in the Bivalve Tree of life (biology) based on both morphological-anatomical and molecular data. He serves as an editor for the phylum Mollusca on the World Register of Marine Species (WoRMS) and as a Chief Editor for MolluscaBase.

Bieler led collaborative efforts in molluscan systematics and evolutionary biology supported by the National Science Foundation (NSF) serving as Principal Investigator of Partnership for Enhancing Expertise in Taxonomy, PEET(PEET-Bivalves) and the Tree of Life project. He organized various international scientific symposia resulting in peer-reviewed symposium volumes on molluscan systematics and evolution.

He and collaborators developed a series of International Marine Bivalve Workshops that paired students and early-career faculty with leading scientists during intensive fieldwork experiences, resulting in jointly published peer-reviewed articles in scientific journals.

A regional focus of his work has been on the invertebrate animal diversity of South Florida and the Florida Keys. He is affiliated with The Elizabeth Moore International Center for Coral Reef Research and Restoration of Mote Marine Laboratory. The research concentrates on the development and documentation of baseline data of regional diversity, allowing the recognition of faunal changes due to human impact. Bieler's work in the Florida Keys encompasses an active participation in coral reef restoration efforts, and the survey and monitoring of shipwrecks off the Florida Keys for invasive marine species.

== Honorary appointments ==
Bieler held honorary appointments with various research institutions, including the Smithsonian Institution, Harvard University, and the American Museum of Natural History in New York. He was elected President of both the American Malacological Society (AMU/AMS, 1996) and the International Malacological Society "Unitas Malacologia" (1995-1998) and organized their congresses in Chicago in 1996 and Washington, DC. in 1998.

Bieler has served as President of the Institute of Malacology (publishers of Malacologia - International Journal of Malacology) and as editor or associated editor for numerous scientific serials, including the Zoological Journal of the Linnean Society. He is a Fellow of the Linnean Society of London. Actively involved in the administration of natural history museums, he served in various roles including Zoology Department Chair (Field Museum, 1998-2002) and Board Trustee of the Delaware Museum of Natural History (1991-1999).

== Exhibitions and publications ==
Bieler has been a key contributor to several major museum exhibitions, including Pearls, Evolution on the Half Shell and Specimens!. His own work has been featured in permanent museum exhibitions, such as Abbott Hall of Conservation - Restoring Earth, in a book about the curatorial profession, as well as PBS NewsHour and PBS Changing Seas episodes. He has published, alone or in collaboration with others, more than 100 books, monographs, and articles.

== Taxa of mollusks described and named ==
Bieler has described and named, alone or with collaborators, various taxa of mollusks new to science (compiled from MolluscaBase.org, there with full literature links

- Adelphotectonica Bieler, 1987
- Cupolaconcha Golding, Bieler, Rawlings & Collins, 2014
- Toulminella Bieler & Dockery III, 2007
- Ammonicera mexicana Sartori & Bieler, 2014
- Architectonica arcana Bieler, 1993
- Architectonica gualtierii Bieler, 1993
- Cornirostra floridana Bieler & Mikkelsen, 1998
- Ctenoides obliquus Mikkelsen & Bieler, 2003
- Cupolaconcha guana Golding, Bieler, Rawlings & Collins, 2014
- Cupolaconcha sinaiensis Golding, Bieler, Rawlings & Collins, 2014
- Divariscintilla cordiformis Mikkelsen & Bieler, 1992
- Divariscintilla octotentaculata Mikkelsen & Bieler, 1992
- Divariscintilla yoyo Mikkelsen & Bieler, 1989
- Granosolarium gemmiferum Bieler, 1993
- Heliacus hyperionis Bieler, 1993
- Heliacus oceanitis Bieler, 1993
- Heliacus turritus Bieler, 1987
- Imparidentia Bieler, Mikkelsen & Giribet, 2014
- Mathilda boucheti Bieler, 1995
- Mathilda maculosa Bieler, 1995
- Novastoa bahamensis Golding, Bieler, Rawlings & Collins, 2014
- Novastoa caboverdensis Golding, Bieler, Rawlings & Collins, 2014
- Pseudotorinia armillata Bieler, 1993
- Pseudotorinia sestertius Bieler, 1993
- Solatisonax kilburni Bieler, 1993
- Solatisonax propinqua Bieler, 1993
- Spirolaxis argonauta Bieler, 1993
- Spirolaxis exornatus Bieler, 1993
- Stephopoma levispinosum Bieler, 1997
- Tuba fuscocincta Bieler, 1995
- Ceraesignum Golding, Bieler, Rawlings & Collins, 2014
- Pyrgoheliacus Bieler, 1987
- Ammonicera mcleani Sartori & Bieler, 2014
- Ammonicera sleursi Sartori & Bieler, 2014
- Architectonica consobrina Bieler1993
- Ceraesignum robinsoncrusoei Golding, Bieler, Rawlings & Collins, 2014
- Ctenoides miamiensis Mikkelsen & Bieler, 2003
- Ctenoides vokesi Mikkelsen & Bieler, 2003
- Cupolaconcha maldivensis Golding, Bieler, Rawlings & Collins, 2014
- Dendropoma expolitum Golding, Bieler, Rawlings & Collins, 2014
- Divariscintilla luteocrinita Mikkelsen & Bieler, 1992
- Divariscintilla troglodytes Mikkelsen & Bieler, 1989
- Granosolarium excavatum Bieler, 1993
- Heliacus geminus Bieler, 1993
- Heliacus nereidis Bieler, 1993
- Heliacus proteus Bieler, 1993
- Heliacus verdensis Bieler, 1984
- Mathilda houbricki Bieler, 1995
- Mathilda richeri Bieler, 1995
- Novastoa batavia Golding, Bieler, Rawlings & Collins, 2014
- Novastoa pholetor Golding, Bieler, Rawlings & Collins, 2014
- Pseudotorinia bullisi Bieler, Merrill & Boss, 1985
- Pseudotorinia yaroni Bieler, 1993
- Solatisonax orba Bieler, 1993
- Solatisonax rehderi Bieler, 1993
- Spirolaxis cornuarietis Bieler, 1993
- Stephopoma abrolhosense Bieler, 1997
- Tenagodus barbadensis Bieler, 2004
- Thylacodes vandyensis Bieler, Rawlings & Collins, 2017

== Species named for Bieler ==
Several recent and fossil species were named in his honor, including:

- Architectonica bieleri Perrilliat, 2013 (Architectonicidae: Late Paleocene, Baja California, Mexico)
- Haplocochlias bieleri Rubio, Fernández-Garcés & Rolán, 2013 (Skeneidae: Recent, Florida)
- Mathilda bieleri Smiriglio & Mariottini, 2007 (Mathildidae: Recent, Mediterranean)
- Minidonta bieleri Sartori, Gargominy & Fontaine, 2013 (Endodontidae: Recent, presumed extinct, French Polynesia)
- Niveria bieleri Fehse, Greco & Bystrica, 2016 (Triviidae: Recent: Florida Keys)
- Rinaldoconchus bieleri Bandel, 1996 (Architectonicidae: Upper Triassic, Europe)
- Solatisonax bieleri Nielsen & Frassinetti, 2007 (Architectonicidae: Miocene, Chile)
- Solatisonax rudigerbieleri Tenório, Barros, Francisco & Silva, 2011 (Architectonicidae: Recent, Brazil)
- Stephopoma ruedigeri Landau, da Silva & Heitz, 2016 (Siliquariidae: Lower-Middle Miocene, Venezuela)
- Vermetus bieleri Scuderi, Swinnen & Templado, 2017 (Vermetidae: Recent, Eastern Atlantic)
