= John Jenkinson =

John Jenkinson may refer to:

- Sir John Jenkinson, 14th Baronet (b. 1945), of the Jenkinson baronets
- John Jenkinson (bishop) (1781–1840), English churchman, Bishop of St David's
- John Jenkinson (British politician) (died 1805), MP for Corfe Castle
- John Jenkinson (New Zealand politician) (1858–1937), member of the New Zealand Legislative Council
- John Jenkinson (rowing) (born 1941), Australian rower who competed at the 1956 Summer Olympics
- John Wilfred Jenkinson (1871–1915), namesake of the J. W. Jenkinson Memorial Lectureship
