= S. plicata =

S. plicata may refer to:

- Spathoglottis plicata, the large purple orchid, a terrestrial orchid species found from tropical and subtropical Asia to the western Pacific including Tonga and Samoa
- Styela plicata, a tropical to temperate tunicate species

== See also ==
- Plicata (disambiguation)
