= A.O. Kovalevsky Medal =

Award in biology

The A.O. Kovalevsky Medal, awarded annually by the St. Petersburg Society of Naturalists for extraordinary achievements in evolutionary developmental biology and comparative zoology, is named after the noted Russian embryologist Alexander Onufrievich Kovalevsky. Since 2002, only one medal has been awarded annually (excepting a joint award in 2014).{Mikhailov and Gilbert, 2002}

== Recipients ==
- 2024 Alessandro Minelli, Professor, Padua University, Padova, (Italy)
- 2023 Veronica Hinman, Distinguished Professor of Life Sciences, Carnegie Mellon University, Pittsburgh, Pennsylvania (USA)
- 2021 Nipam Patel, University of Chicago and Director of the Marine Biological Laboratory (USA)
- 2020 Edward M. De Robertis, (USA/ARGENTINA) Department of Biological Chemistry, University of California at Los Angeles
- 2019 Mary E. Rice, Director of the Smithsonian Marine Station at Fort Pierce Florida, (USA)
- 2018 Andreas Hejnol, Professor of Molecular Biology, University of Bergen (Norway)
- 2017 Vladimir Malakhov, Department of Invertebrate Zoology, Lomonosov Moscow State University, Moscow (Russia)
- 2016 Günter Wagner, Department of Ecology and Evolutionary Biology, Yale University, New Haven CT (USA)
- 2015 Frederik Nijhout, Department of Biology, Duke University, Durham NC (USA)
- 2014 Linda Zimmerman Holland and Nicholas Drew Holland (jointly), Marine Biology Research Division, Scripps Institution of Oceanography, University of California at San Diego (USA).
- 2013 Denis Duboule, École Polytechnique Fédérale de Lausanne (EPFL), University of Geneva (Switzerland)
- 2012 William R. Jeffery, Professor of Biology, University of Maryland (USA)
- 2011 Detlev Arendt, European Molecular Biology Laboratory, Heidelberg (Germany).
- 2010 Shigeru Kuratani from the Center for Developmental Biology, Kobe (Japan)
- 2009 Mark Q. Martindale, Professor of Organismal Biology and Director of Kewalo Marine Laboratory, University of Hawaii (USA)
- 2008 Sean B. Carroll, Professor of Molecular Biology and Genetics, University of Wisconsin (USA)
- 2007 Michael Edwin Akam, Professor of Zoology and Director, University Museum of Zoology, Cambridge (United Kingdom)
- 2006 Peter Holland, Department of Zoology, Oxford (United Kingdom)
- 2005 Noriyuki Satoh, Department of Zoology, Faculty of Science, Kyoto University (Japan)
- 2004 Scott Gilbert, Howard A. Schneiderman Professor of Biology, Swarthmore College (USA)
- 2003 Walter Jakob Gehring, Professor, Biozentrum, University of Basel (Switzerland)
- 2002 Eric H. Davidson, Norman Chandler Professor of Cell Biology. California Institute of Technology, Pasadena (USA)

The 2001 medal was awarded to

- Donald Thomas Anderson (Australia), comparative anatomy and embryology
- Gary Freeman (USA), Professor of Zoology University of Texas Austin, embryological grounds of animal evolution
- Brian Hall (Canada), Professor of Biology, Dalhousie University, Halifax, Canada; synthesis of embryology and evolution
- Olga Mikhailovna Ivanova-Kazas, Professor of St. Petersburg State University (Russia)
- Claus Nielsen (Denmark), development of comparative morphology and phylogeny of multi-celled organisms
- Rudolf Raff (USA), James H. Rudy Professor of Biology, at Indiana University, and the author of several books on embryology and evolution
- Rupert Riedl (Austria), Professor of Zoology at the Vienna University, Austria
- Klaus Sander (Germany), Professor of Zoology at Freiburg University, Germany

== See also ==
- List of biology awards
