= William Jeffery =

American professor of evolutionary developmental biology

William R. Jeffery
- Born: Chicago, Illinois
- Education: University of Illinois; University of Iowa
- Awards: A.O. Kovalevsky Medal (2012)
- Scientific career
- Fields: Evolutionary developmental biology
- Workplaces: Pennsylvania State University; University of Maryland University of California, Davis University of Texas at Austin

William R. Jeffery is an American professor of evolutionary developmental biology whose studies focus on the evolution of development, especially blind cavefish and tunicates. He is a fellow of the American Association for the Advancement of Science and the Linnean Society of London.

== Early life ==
Born in Chicago, Jeffery obtained his Bachelor of Science degree from University of Illinois in 1968 and his Ph.D. from University of Iowa three years later. In 1971, for a year, he worked as a teacher at the Children's School of Science, Woods Hole, MA. From 1971 to 1972 he was a postdoctoral fellow at the University of Wisconsin–Madison and the same years worked as postdoc at the McArdle Laboratory of University of Wisconsin–Madison. He continued his postdoctoral fellowship from 1972 to 1974 at the Tufts University School of Medicine for those two years.

== Career ==
After becoming a faculty member in zoology in the University of Texas at Austin, Jeffery published a study in Developmental Biology which suggested that Poly(A)-binding protein is present in oocyte and is responsible for oogenesis in the African clawed frog. In 1983 he along with Craig R. Tomlinson and Richard D. Brodeur studied Styela plicata's eggs and suggested that cytoplasmic regions also carry messenger RNA codes for actin isoform. In 1995 he, Billie J. Swalla and Noriyuki Satoh studied tailless tadpole larvae of the Ascidiacea species and discovered that the Manx gene may be responsible for tail control and development.

In 1990, Jeffery moved from the University of Texas to the University of California, Davis and was a researcher at the Bodega Marine Laboratory. Here he continued to work on evolutionary changes in development between tailess and tailed ascidian species and began research to develop the cave fish Astyanax mexicanus as a model system to study the evolutionary basis of eye and pigment degeneration in cave animals. In 1995-96 Jeffery was President of the Society for Developmental Biology. From 1996 to 1999 Jeffery was the head of the Department of Biology at the Pennsylvania State University and then from that year to 2004 was chairman of the same field at the University of Maryland. For a year after that he was a visiting scientist at the CNRS and then held the same position at the Ruđer Bošković Institute in Zagreb, Croatia from 2011 to 2012. Currently, Jeffery is a Distinguished Professor of Biology at the University of Maryland, College Park. He also conducts research at Marine Biological Laboratory Bell Center for Regenerative Biology and Tissue Engineering in Woods Hole, Massachusetts and the Stion Biologique, Roscoff, France.

== Honors and awards ==
- Jeffery is Distinguished University Professor at the University of Maryland.
- In 1992, he was elected as a fellow of the American Association for the Advancement of Science and then in 2008 became a fellow of the Linnean Society of London.
- In 2010, Jeffery received the Karst Waters Research Award for his studies in subterranean biology.
- In 2012 Jeffery was awarded the Alexander Kowalevsky Medal by the St. Petersburg Society of Naturalists for extraordinary achievements in evolutionary developmental biology and comparative zoology.
- In 2018, Jeffery received the Science Award from the National Speleological Society.
- In 2021 he received the Board of Visitors Distinguished Faculty Award from the University of Maryland College of Computer, Mathematical and Natural Sciences.
