= Clavanin B =

Names
- Other names VFQFLGRIIHHVGNFVHGFSHVF (peptide sequence)

Identifiers
3D model (JSmol)	Interactive image
ChEMBL	ChEMBL1240716
ChemSpider	26352851
PubChem CID	49777288
CompTox Dashboard (EPA)	DTXSID101045511
- InChI: InChI=1S/C131H184N36O27/c1-15-75(13)109(167-129(192)110(76(14)16-2)166-114(177)86(43-32-46-141-131(135)136)149-102(171)62-142-111(174)88(47-70(3)4)153-117(180)90(49-78-35-24-18-25-36-78)154-113(176)87(44-45-100(132)169)152-116(179)91(50-79-37-26-19-27-38-79)158-124(187)105(134)71(5)6)128(191)160-94(54-83-59-138-67-146-83)118(181)156-95(55-84-60-139-68-147-84)121(184)163-106(72(7)8)125(188)144-64-104(173)151-97(57-101(133)170)119(182)155-92(51-80-39-28-20-29-40-80)120(183)164-107(73(9)10)126(189)159-93(53-82-58-137-66-145-82)112(175)143-63-103(172)150-89(48-77-33-22-17-23-34-77)115(178)162-99(65-168)123(186)157-96(56-85-61-140-69-148-85)122(185)165-108(74(11)12)127(190)161-98(130(193)194)52-81-41-30-21-31-42-81/h17-31,33-42,58-61,66-76,86-99,105-110,168H,15-16,32,43-57,62-65,134H2,1-14H3,(H2,132,169)(H2,133,170)(H,137,145)(H,138,146)(H,139,147)(H,140,148)(H,142,174)(H,143,175)(H,144,188)(H,149,171)(H,150,172)(H,151,173)(H,152,179)(H,153,180)(H,154,176)(H,155,182)(H,156,181)(H,157,186)(H,158,187)(H,159,189)(H,160,191)(H,161,190)(H,162,178)(H,163,184)(H,164,183)(H,165,185)(H,166,177)(H,167,192)(H,193,194)(H4,135,136,141)/t75-,76-,86-,87-,88-,89-,90-,91-,92-,93-,94-,95-,96-,97-,98-,99-,105-,106-,107-,108-,109-,110-/m0/s1 Key: KENGXPKQZMFVCK-PWWQNGLPSA-N
- SMILES: CC[C@H](C)[C@@H](C(=O)N[C@@H]([C@@H](C)CC)C(=O)N[C@@H](CC1=CN=CN1)C(=O)N[C@@H](CC2=CN=CN2)C(=O)N[C@@H](C(C)C)C(=O)NCC(=O)N[C@@H](CC(=O)N)C(=O)N[C@@H](CC3=CC=CC=C3)C(=O)N[C@@H](C(C)C)C(=O)N[C@@H](CC4=CN=CN4)C(=O)NCC(=O)N[C@@H](CC5=CC=CC=C5)C(=O)N[C@@H](CO)C(=O)N[C@@H](CC6=CN=CN6)C(=O)N[C@@H](C(C)C)C(=O)N[C@@H](CC7=CC=CC=C7)C(=O)O)NC(=O)[C@H](CCCNC(=N)N)NC(=O)CNC(=O)[C@H](CC(C)C)NC(=O)[C@H](CC8=CC=CC=C8)NC(=O)[C@H](CCC(=O)N)NC(=O)[C@H](CC9=CC=CC=C9)NC(=O)[C@H](C(C)C)N

Properties
Chemical formula	C_{131}H_{184}N_{36}O_{27}
Molar mass	2695.138 g·mol^{−1}
- Except where otherwise noted, data are given for materials in their standard state (at 25 °C [77 °F], 100 kPa). Infobox references

Clavanin B is an alpha-helical antimicrobial peptide isolated from Styela clava.
