= Styelin A =

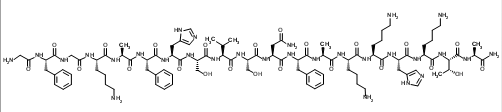

Identifiers
3D model (JSmol)	Interactive image
ChEMBL	ChEMBL1240718
ChemSpider	26349776
PubChem CID	49777289
CompTox Dashboard (EPA)	DTXSID301028414
- InChI: InChI=1S/C95H145N29O23/c1-52(2)77(123-93(145)73(49-126)121-90(142)70(42-61-46-104-51-107-61)119-88(140)68(40-59-28-14-9-15-29-59)116-81(133)55(5)109-83(135)62(30-16-20-34-96)111-76(130)47-105-82(134)66(112-75(129)44-100)38-57-24-10-7-11-25-57)94(146)122-72(48-125)92(144)120-71(43-74(101)128)91(143)117-67(39-58-26-12-8-13-27-58)87(139)110-54(4)80(132)113-63(31-17-21-35-97)84(136)114-64(32-18-22-36-98)85(137)118-69(41-60-45-103-50-106-60)89(141)115-65(33-19-23-37-99)86(138)124-78(56(6)127)95(147)108-53(3)79(102)131/h7-15,24-29,45-46,50-56,62-73,77-78,125-127H,16-23,30-44,47-49,96-100H2,1-6H3,(H2,101,128)(H2,102,131)(H,103,106)(H,104,107)(H,105,134)(H,108,147)(H,109,135)(H,110,139)(H,111,130)(H,112,129)(H,113,132)(H,114,136)(H,115,141)(H,116,133)(H,117,143)(H,118,137)(H,119,140)(H,120,144)(H,121,142)(H,122,146)(H,123,145)(H,124,138)/t53-,54-,55-,56+,62-,63-,64-,65-,66-,67-,68-,69-,70-,71-,72-,73-,77-,78-/m0/s1 Key: AFQLVRYQIBCPCA-RFTSVWPLSA-N
- SMILES: C[C@H]([C@@H](C(=O)N[C@@H](C)C(=O)N)NC(=O)[C@H](CCCCN)NC(=O)[C@H](CC1=CN=CN1)NC(=O)[C@H](CCCCN)NC(=O)[C@H](CCCCN)NC(=O)[C@H](C)NC(=O)[C@H](CC2=CC=CC=C2)NC(=O)[C@H](CC(=O)N)NC(=O)[C@H](CO)NC(=O)[C@H](C(C)C)NC(=O)[C@H](CO)NC(=O)[C@H](CC3=CN=CN3)NC(=O)[C@H](CC4=CC=CC=C4)NC(=O)[C@H](C)NC(=O)[C@H](CCCCN)NC(=O)CNC(=O)[C@H](CC5=CC=CC=C5)NC(=O)CN)O

Properties
Chemical formula	C_{95}H_{145}N_{29}O_{23}
Molar mass	2061.385 g·mol^{−1}
- Except where otherwise noted, data are given for materials in their standard state (at 25 °C [77 °F], 100 kPa). Infobox references

Styelin A is an antibiotic peptide (nonadecapeptide) isolated from Styela clava.
