= J. W. Jenkinson Memorial Lectureship =

J. W. Jenkinson, 1901.

John Wilfred Jenkinson (1871–1915) was a pioneer in the field of comparative developmental biology (the forerunner of evolutionary developmental biology) and one of the first to introduce experimental embryology to the UK at the start of the 20th century. He originally studied Classics as an undergraduate student at Oxford, before switching his attention to Zoology under the guidance of W. F. R. Weldon at University College London. He also travelled to Utrecht University in the Netherlands, to work with Ambrosius Hubrecht, and was exposed to new methods and approaches in embryology. In 1905, he was appointed the first lecturer in Embryology at the University of Oxford in England, and in 1909 published the first English textbook on experimental embryology in which he summarized recent work in the emerging scientific discipline and criticized neo-vitalist theories of Hans Driesch.

At the outbreak of war in 1914, Jenkinson joined the Oxford Volunteer Training Corps. In January 1915 he was assigned to the 12th Battalion of the Worcestershire Regiment and was soon promoted to the rank of captain. Jenkinson left England with his regiment in May, posted to the Dardanelles in Turkey. On 4 June 1915, just days after arriving on the Gallipoli peninsula, Jenkinson was killed. After Jenkinson's death at Gallipoli in June 1915, the University of Oxford established the John Wilfred Jenkinson Lectureship in his memory. The original statutes required the lecturer or lecturers, appointed annually, to deliver “one or more lectures or lecture demonstrations on comparative or experimental embryology”.

Each year, a Board of Electors selects one or two Jenkinson Lecturers who are invited to Oxford to present a lecture in the broad area of developmental biology. The list of Jenkinson Lecturers includes many distinguished names, including Nobel Laureates (marked with *).

== Holders of the J. W. Jenkinson Lectureship ==
- 1961 Michail Fischberg
- 1962 P. H. Tuft
- 1963 Wolfgang Beerman
- 1964 Jean Brachet
- 1965 Rupert E. Billingham,
- 1966 Jan Erik Edstrom
- 1966 Alberto Monroy
- 1967 *Bob Edwards
- 1968 Georg Klein
- 1969 R. M. Gaze
- 1969 H. Chantrenne
- 1970 *Sydney Brenner
- 1970 Niels Kaj Jerne
- 1971 Ernst Hadorn
- 1971 J. M. Mitchison
- 1972 Anne McLaren
- 1972 G. Gerisch
- 1973 Susumu Ohno
- 1974 Ruggero Ceppellini
- 1975 Andrzej Tarkowski
- 1976 No formal lecture was held
- 1977 Nils R. Ringertz
- 1978 Martin Luscher
- 1978 Armin C. Braun
- 1980 Pasko Rakic
- 1980 Walter Fiers
- 1980 Nicole Le Douarin
- 1981 Werner Reichardt
- 1981 Antonio García-Bellido
- 1982 Lionel Jaffe
- 1982 Maurice Sussmann
- 1983 Stanley M. Crain
- 1984 Rudolf Jaenisch
- 1984 *Robert G. Edwards
- 1985 G. S. Dawes
- 1985 *François Jacob
- 1985 Hans G. Schweiger
- 1986 W. Maxwell Cowan
- 1986 Marc Kirschner
- 1986 Peter A. Lawrence
- 1987 *Gerald Edelman
- 1988 Corey Goodman
- 1989 Josef Schell
- 1989 *John Gurdon
- 1989 Webster K. Cavenee
- 1990 Kai Simons
- 1991 Carla Shatz
- 1991 Harold Weintraub
- 1992 Manfred Schartl
- 1992 Noriyuki Satoh
- 1992 Bruce Cattanach
- 1993 Chuck B. Kimmell
- 1993 Andrew Lumsden
- 1994 Peter Gruss
- 1995 Brigid Hogan
- 1996 Ray Guillery
- 1996 Susan K McConnell
- 1997 James C Smith
- 1997 Cliff Tabin
- 1997 *Tim Hunt
- 1998 Peter J. Bryant
- 1999 Davor Solter
- 1999 Françoise Dieterlan-Lievre
- 2000 Peter Holland
- 2000 Max Bear
- 2000 Eduardo Boncinelli
- 2001 Marc Tessier-Lavigne
- 2002 *Roger Tsien
- 2002 Enrico Coen
- 2003 Mike Bate
- 2004 Cheryll Tickle
- 2004 Rudy Raff
- 2005 Gerd Jürgens
- 2005 David Weisblat
- 2006 Stephen Cohen
- 2006 Michael Akam
- 2007 Shigeru Kuratani
- 2007 Janet Rossant
- 2008 Richard Gardner
- 2008 Didier Stainier
- 2009 Sean B. Carroll
- 2009 Wendy Bickmore
- 2010 Nick Hastie
- 2010 Paul Sternberg
- 2010 David Kingsley
- 2011 Jurgen Knoblich
- 2012 Caroline Dean
- 2012 Hopi Hoekstra
- 2013 Olivier Pourquie
- 2013 Nipam Patel
- 2014 Gero Miesenböck
- 2014 Alex Schier
- 2015 *John Gurdon
- 2016 Detlef Weigel
- 2016 Linda Partridge
- 2017 *Jennifer Doudna
- 2018 Liqun Luo
- 2018 Elizabeth Robertson
- 2019 Andrea Brand
- 2019 *Shinya Yamanaka
- 2022 Nancy Papalopulu
- 2023 Denis Duboule
- 2024 Ben Lehner
- 2024 Elly Tanaka
- 2025 James Sharpe
- 2026 Irene Miguel-Aliaga
- 2026 Cassandra Extavour
- 2026 Nicole King
- 2027 Philip Ingham

== Lectureship management ==
The lecturers are elected by an electoral board consisting of: the vice-chancellor of the University of Oxford; the rector of Exeter College, Oxford; the Regius Professor of Medicine; the Linacre Professor of Zoology; the Waynflete Professor of Physiology; Dr. Lee's Professor of Anatomy; and a member of the Mathematical, Physical and Life Sciences Board elected by that board.
