= Ray Guillery =

British physiologist and neuroanatomist

Rainer Walter "Ray" Guillery FRS (28 August 1929 – 7 April 2017) was a British physiologist and neuroanatomist. He is best known for his discovery that in Siamese cats with certain genotypes of the albino gene, the wiring of the optic chiasm is disrupted, with less of the nerve-crossing than is normal.

== Early life and education ==
Guillery was born in Greifswald, Germany on 28 August 1929. He began his education as a medical student at University College London (UCL) in 1948. He obtained his BSc in 1951 and his PhD in 1954.

== Career ==
Guillery taught at UCL for 11 years. In 1964 he went to University of Wisconsin–Madison, where he helped to start the new graduate programme in neuroscience. In 1977, he moved to the University of Chicago to lead another new graduate neuroscience programme. In 1984, Guillery returned to the UK as head of the department of Human Anatomy and Dr. Lee's Professor of Anatomy at the University of Oxford, until 1996. He was then subsequently a professor emeritus of anatomy at the University of Wisconsin Medical School and, as of 2010, an honorary emeritus research fellow at the Anatomical Neuropharmacology Unit at Oxford.

In 1989, Guillery was the founding editor-in-chief of the European Journal of Neuroscience.

He died on 7 April 2017 at the age of 87.

== Honours ==
He was made a Fellow of the Royal Society in 1983, and a Fellow of University College London in 1987. In 1996, he delivered the J. W. Jenkinson Memorial Lectureship.
