= Hans Driesch =

German biologist and philosopher

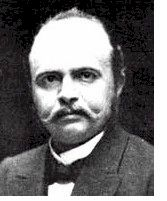
- Born: Hans Adolf Eduard Driesch; 28 October 1867; Bad Kreuznach, Kingdom of Prussia
- Died: 17 April 1941 (aged 73); Leipzig, Germany
- Known for: Developmental biology Neo-vitalist philosophy of entelechy Lebensphilosophie; Equifinality
- Scientific career
- Fields: Biology, philosophy
- Notable students: Roy Wood Sellars

Hans Adolf Eduard Driesch (28 October 1867 – 17 April 1941) was a German biologist and philosopher from Bad Kreuznach. He is most noted for his early experimental work in embryology and for his neo-vitalist philosophy of entelechy. He has also been credited with performing the first artificial 'cloning' of an animal in the 1880s, although this claim is dependent on how one defines cloning.

== Early years ==
Driesch was educated at the Gelehrtenschule des Johanneums. He began to study medicine in 1886 under August Weismann at the University of Freiburg. In 1887, he attended the University of Jena under Ernst Haeckel, Oscar Hertwig and Christian Ernst Stahl. In 1888, he studied physics and chemistry at the Ludwig-Maximilians-Universität München. He received his doctorate in 1889. He travelled widely on field and study trips and lecture-tours, visiting Plymouth, India, Zurich and Leipzig where, in 1894, he published his Analytische Theorie der organischen Entwicklung or Analytic Theory of Organic Development. His interests encompassed mathematics, philosophy and physics as well as biology. He married Margarete Relfferschneidt, and the couple had two children.

== Experiments in embryology ==
From 1891, Driesch worked in Naples at the Marine Biological Station, where until 1901, he continued to experiment and seek a theoretical formulation of his results. He inquired into classical and modern philosophy in his search for an adequate theoretical overview and ended by adopting an Aristotelian teleological theory of entelechy.

Under the influence of his teacher Haeckel, Driesch had tested the mechanistic embryological theories of another of Haeckel's students, Wilhelm Roux. Driesch studied sea urchin embryos, and found that when he separated the two cells of the embryo after the first cell-division, each developed into a complete sea urchin. This was contrary to his expectation that each cell would develop into the corresponding half of the animal, a prediction based on Wilhelm Roux's earlier work with frog embryos. This also happened at the four-cell stage: entire larvae ensued from each of the four cells, albeit smaller than usual. By 1885, Driesch's experiments on the sea urchin embryo showed that it was even possible to shuffle the blastomeres of the early embryo without affecting the resulting larva.

These findings suggested that any single cell in the early embryo was capable of forming any part of the developing larva. This seemed to be an important refutation of both early preformation ideas and the later mosaic theory of Wilhelm Roux, and was to be subject to much discussion in the ensuing years. The conclusion caused friction among Driesch, Roux and Haeckel. Driesch's findings brought about the adoption of the terms "totipotent" and "pluripotent" cell, referring respectively to a cell that can generate every cell in an organism and one that can generate nearly every cell.

Driesch's results were confirmed with greater precision, and the experiments extended, by Sven Hörstadius who showed that conclusions of equivalence between sea urchin embryonic cells were an over-simplification.

== The philosophy of entelechy ==
Driesch, believing that his results compromised contemporary mechanistic theories of ontogeny, instead proposed that the autonomy of life that he deduced from this persistence of embryological development despite interferences was due to what he called entelechy, a term borrowed from Aristotle's philosophy to indicate a life force which he conceived of as psychoid or "mind-like", that is; non-spatial, intensive, and qualitative rather than spatial, extensive, and quantitative.

Driesch was awarded the chair of natural theology at the University of Aberdeen, where he delivered the Gifford Lectures in 1906 and 1908 on The Science and Philosophy of the Organism – the first comprehensive presentation of his ideas. From 1909, determined to take up a career in academic philosophy, he taught natural philosophy at the Faculty of Natural Sciences at Heidelberg University. In the ensuing decade he published a complete system of philosophy in three volumes, including his fundamental Theory of Order (1912) in which he proposed a three-part "doctrine of order".

In 1919, he was the ordinary professor of systematic philosophy at the University of Cologne and in 1921 professor of philosophy at Leipzig University, though he was a visiting professor in Nanjing and Beijing during 1922 and 1923, and in 1923 he received honorable doctor's degree from National Southeastern University (later renamed National Central University and Nanjing University) where he taught for a semester. He taught at the University of Wisconsin (1926–27) and at the University of Buenos Aires (1928). In 1933, he was removed from his chair at Leipzig University and prematurely placed in emeritus status by the Nazi administration, the first non-Jewish academic to be thus expelled, because of his pacifism and open hostility to Nazism. He became interested in parapsychology and published on such phenomena as telepathy, clairvoyance, and telekinesis.

His concept of entelechy was criticized by the scientific community. Biologist J. W. Jenkinson wrote that Driesch was inventing new entities "beyond necessity and the progress of science would be better served by a simpler philosophy." Zoologist Herbert Spencer Jennings commented that the concept of entelechy "does not help in our understanding of matters in the least."

His vitalist writings were criticized by historian Ruth Brandon for being based on a religious rather than an objective scientific standpoint.

== Parapsychology ==
Driesch developed a deep interest in psychical research and parapsychology. In 1931, he published a methodology of parapsychological research (in German) and in 1933, he published a book on the topic titled Psychical Research: The Science of the Super-normal. From 1926 to 1927, he served as the president of the Society for Psychical Research.

== Selected works ==
=== In German ===
- Die Biologie als selbstständige Wissenschaft (1893)
- Die Lokalisation morphogenetischer Vorgänge Ein Beweis vitalistischen Geschehens (1899)
- Analytische Theorie der organischen Entwicklung (1894)
- Der Vitalismus als Geschichte und als Lehre (1905)
- Der Begriff der organischen Form (1919)
- Philosophie des Organischen (4th ed. 1928)

=== In English ===
- Driesch, H. (1908). The Science and Philosophy of the Organism: The Gifford Lectures delivered before the University of Aberdeen in the Year 1907 and 1908 (2 vols.). London: Adam and Charles Black. 2nd ed. London: A. & C. Black, 1929.
- Driesch, H. (1912). The Justification of Vitalism. Cambridge Magazine 1 (15): 397.
- Driesch, H. (1914). The Problem of Individuality: A Course of Four Lectures Delivered before the University of London in October 1913. London: Macmillan.
- Driesch, H. (1914). The History and Theory of Vitalism. (C. K. Ogden, trans.) London: Macmillan.
- Driesch, H. (1924). "The Biological Setting of Psychical Phenomena". The Quest 15 (July): 433–456.
- Driesch, H. (1925). The Crisis in Psychology. Princeton, NJ: Princeton University Press.
- Driesch, H. (1925). The Possibility of Metaphysics: The Course of Four Lectures Delivered before the University of London in March 1924. London: Faith Press.
- Driesch, H. (1926). "The Present Status of the Philosophy of Nature in Germany". The Monist 36 (2): 281–298.
- Driesch, H. (1926). "Psychical Research and Established Science". Presidential address. Proceedings of the Society for Psychical Research 36(99): 171–186.
- Driesch, H. (1927). "Psychical Research and Philosophy". In: Carl Murchison (ed.), The Case For and Against Psychical Belief. Worcester: Clark University, 163–178.
- Driesch, H. (1933). Psychical Research: The Science of the Super-Normal. (Theodore Besterman, trans.) London: G. Bell & Sons.
- Driesch, H. (1934). "Psychiatry and Mental Health". Ancient Philosophy 44: 152. [Book Review]

== See also ==
- Ernst Haeckel
- Wilhelm Roux
- Hans Spemann
- Alexander Gurwitsch
