= Styela adriatica =

Scientific classification
- Domain: Eukaryota
- Kingdom: Animalia
- Phylum: Chordata
- Subphylum: Tunicata
- Class: Ascidiacea
- Order: Stolidobranchia
- Family: Styelidae
- Genus: Styela
- Species: S. adriatica

Binomial name
- Styela adriatica (Monniot F. & Monniot C., 1976)

Species of Ascidiacea

Styela adriatica is a hermaphroditic ascidian tunicate that is found along the northern Atlantic and Mediterranean coast of Europe
