= H. Frederik Nijhout =

American evolutionary biologist

- Born: Herman Frederik Nijhout; November 25, 1947 (age 78)
- Education: University of Notre Dame; Harvard University
- Known for: Research on developmental biology of insects
- Awards: A.O. Kowalevsky Medal (2015)
- Scientific career
- Fields: Entomology; Evolutionary developmental biology
- Institutions: Duke University
- Thesis: The control of molting and metamorphosis in the tobacco hornworm (1974)
- Doctoral advisor: Carroll M. Williams
- Other academic advisors: George B. Craig

Herman Frederik Nijhout (born November 25, 1947) is a Dutch-born American evolutionary biologist and the John Franklin Crowell Professor of Biology at Duke University. His research is focused on evolutionary developmental biology and entomology, with a particular focus on the hormonal control of growth, molting and metamorphosis in insects, including the mechanisms that control the development of alternative phenotypes. Much of his work has also been concerned with understanding the development and evolution of the wing patterns of butterflies. He received the ESA Founders' Memorial Award from the Entomological Society of America in 2006. In 2015, he was awarded the A.O. Kowalevsky Medal, and in 2018, he was elected a fellow of the American Academy of Arts and Sciences. He was elected a Member of the National Academy of Sciences in 2025.
