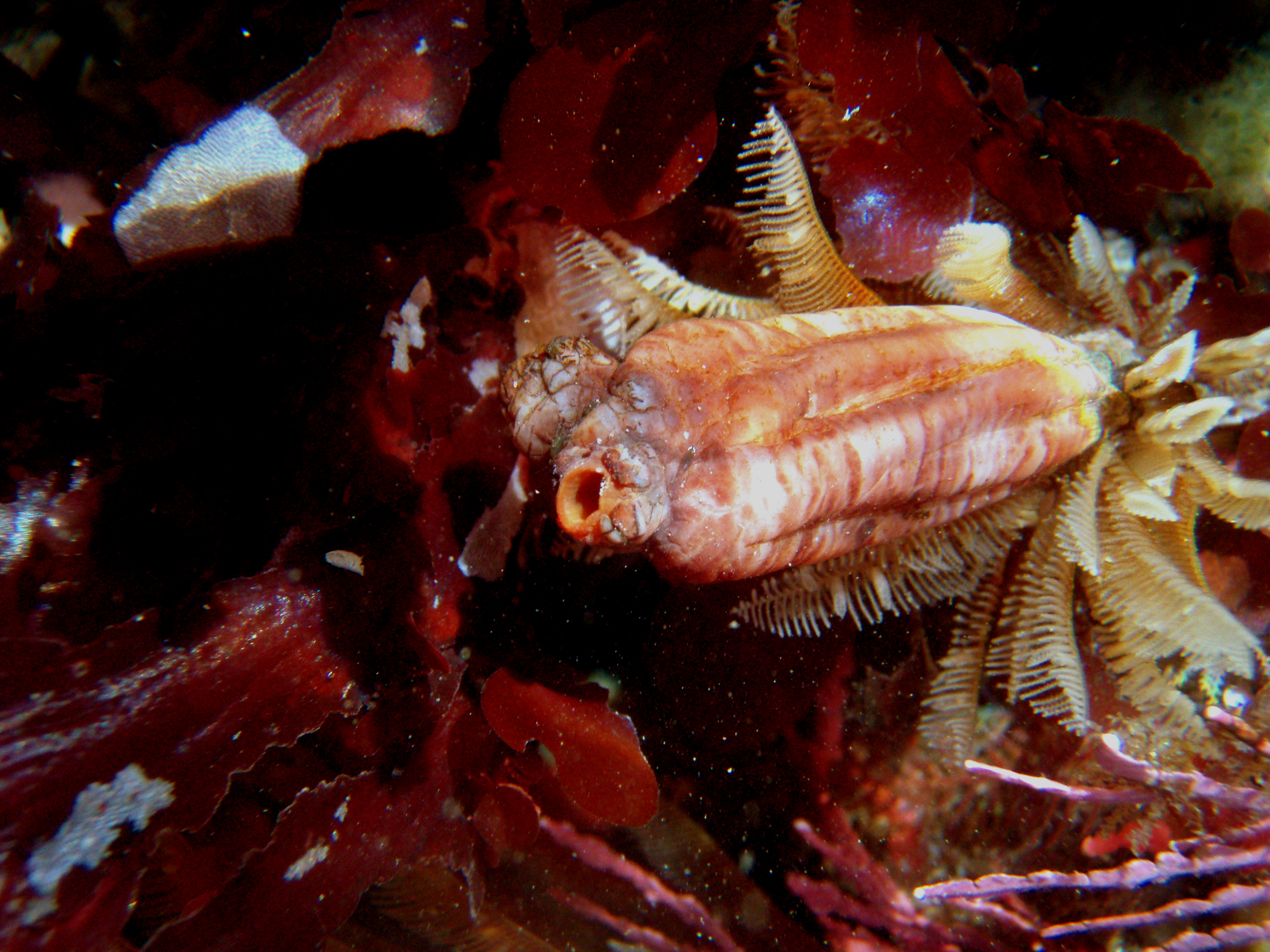
- Styela montereyensis

Scientific classification
- Domain: Eukaryota
- Kingdom: Animalia
- Phylum: Chordata
- Subphylum: Tunicata
- Class: Ascidiacea
- Order: Stolidobranchia
- Family: Styelidae
- Genus: Styela; Fleming, 1822

Species
- See text

= Styela =

Genus of tunicates

Styela is a genus of tunicates. Styela clava, an edible species, is known as an invasive species in some areas.

Species include:

- Styela adriatica F. & C. Monniot, 1976
- Styela aequatorialis Michaelsen, 1915
- Styela angularis (Stimpson, 1855)
- Styela aomori Oka, 1935
- Styela argillacea Sluiter, 1900
- Styela asterogama Millar, 1975
- Styela bathybia Bonnevie, 1896
- Styela brevigaster Millar, 1988
- Styela calva Monniot C., Monniot F. & Millar, 1976
- Styela canopus (Savigny, 1816)
- Styela chaini Monniot C. & Monniot F., 1970
- Styela changa Monniot & Andrade, 1983
- Styela charcoti Monniot C. & Monniot F., 1973
- Styela clava Herdman, 1881
- Styela clavata (Pallas, 1774)
- Styela complexa Kott, 1995
- Styela coriacea (Alder & Hancock, 1848)
- Styela crinita Monniot C. & Monniot F., 1973
- Styela eurygaster Millar, 1977
- Styela gagetyleri Young & Vazquez, 1997
- Styela gelatinosa (Traustedt, 1886)
- Styela gibbsii Stimpson, 1864
- Styela glans Herdman, 1881
- Styela glebosa Sluiter, 1904
- Styela hadalis Sanamyan & Sanamyan, 2006
- Styela herdmani Sluiter, 1885
- Styela izuana (Oka, 1934)
- Styela kottae Monniot & Monniot, 1991
- Styela loculosa Monniot C. & Monniot F., 1969
- Styela longiducta Monniot & Monniot, 1985
- Styela longipedata Tokioka, 1953
- Styela longitubis Traustedt & Weltner, 1894
- Styela macrenteron Ritter, 1913
- Styela maeandria Sluiter, 1904
- Styela magalhaensis Michaelsen, 1898
- Styela mallei Monniot, 1978
- Styela materna Monniot & Monniot, 1983
- Styela meteoris Monniot, 2002
- Styela minima Monniot, 1971
- Styela monogamica Oka, 1935
- Styela montereyensis (Dall, 1872)
- Styela multitentaculata Sanamyan & Sanamyan, 2006
- Styela natalis Hartmeyer, 1905
- Styela ordinaria Monniot & Monniot, 1985
- Styela paessleri (Michaelsen, 1898)
- Styela perforata Sluiter, 1890
- Styela pfefferi Michaelsen, 1898
- Styela plicata (Lesueur, 1823)
- Styela polypes Monniot, Monniot & Millar, 1976
- Styela profunda Sluiter, 1904
- Styela psammodes Sluiter, 1904
- Styela psoliformis Monniot & Monniot, 1989
- Styela rustica Linnaeus, 1767
- Styela schmitti Van Name, 1945
- Styela sericata Herdman, 1888
- Styela sigma Hartmeyer, 1912
- Styela similis Monniot C., 1970
- Styela squamosa Herdman, 1881
- Styela subpinguis Herdman, 1923
- Styela suluensis Monniot & Monniot, 2003
- Styela talpina Monniot, 1978
- Styela tenuibranchia Monniot, Monniot & Millar, 1976
- Styela tesseris Lambert, 1993
- Styela thalassae Monniot C., 1969
- Styela theeli Ärnbäck, 1922
- Styela tholiformis (Sluiter, 1912)
- Styela tokiokai Nishikawa, 1991
- Styela truncata Ritter, 1901
- Styela uniplicata Bonnevie, 1896
- Styela wandeli (Sluiter, 1911)
- Styela yakutatensis Ritter, 1901

Species names currently considered to be synonyms:

- Styela aggregata Traustedt, 1880: synonym of Styela coriacea (Alder & Hancock, 1848)
- Styela albomarginata Sluiter, 1904: synonym of Polycarpa obscura Heller, 1878
- Styela ambonensis Sluiter, 1904: synonym of Polycarpa ambonensis (Sluiter, 1904)
- Styela anguinea Sluiter, 1898: synonym of Polycarpa anguinea (Sluiter, 1898)
- Styela apalina Alder & Hancock, 1907: synonym of Polycarpa pomaria (Savigny, 1816)
- Styela appropinquata Sluiter, 1898: synonym of Polycarpa appropinquata (Sluiter, 1898)
- Styela arctica Swederus, 1887: synonym of Dendrodoa aggregata Müller, 1776
- Styela areolata Heller, 1878: synonym of Cnemidocarpa areolata (Heller, 1878)
- Styela argentata Sluiter, 1890: synonym of Polycarpa argentata (Sluiter, 1890)
- Styela armata Lacaze-Duthiers & Delage, 1892: synonym of Styela coriacea (Alder & Hancock, 1848)
- Styela ascidioides Herdman, 1906: synonym of Polycarpa olitoria (Sluiter, 1890)
- Styela asiphonica Sluiter, 1898: synonym of Polycarpa insulsa (Sluiter, 1898)
- Styela asymmetra (Hartmeyer, 1912): synonym of Asterocarpa humilis (Heller, 1878)
- Styela atlantica (Van Name, 1912): synonym of Styela sigma Hartmeyer, 1912
- Styela aurata (Quoy & Gaimard, 1834): synonym of Polycarpa aurata (Quoy & Gaimard, 1834)
- Styela aurita Sluiter, 1890: synonym of Polycarpa aurita (Sluiter, 1890)
- Styela barbaris Kott, 1952: synonym of Styela canopus (Savigny, 1816)
- Styela barnharti Ritter & Forsyth, 1917: synonym of Styela clava Herdman, 1881
- Styela bathyphila (Millar, 1955): synonym of Cnemidocarpa bathyphila Millar, 1955
- Styela bermudensis Van Name, 1902: synonym of Styela canopus (Savigny, 1816)
- Styela bicolor (Sluiter, 1887): synonym of Styela canopus (Savigny, 1816)
- Styela bicornuta Sluiter, 1900: synonym of Cnemidocarpa bicornuta (Sluiter, 1900)
- Styela biforis Sluiter, 1904: synonym of Polycarpa biforis (Sluiter, 1904)
- Styela brevipedunculata Sluiter, 1898: synonym of Polycarpa spongiabilis Traustedt, 1883
- Styela bythia Herdman, 1881: synonym of Cnemidocarpa bythia (Herdman, 1881)
- Styela canopoides Heller, 1877: synonym of Styela canopus (Savigny, 1816)
- Styela captiosa Sluiter, 1885: synonym of Polycarpa papillata Sluiter, 1885
- Styela cartilaginea Sluiter, 1898: synonym of Polycarpa cartilaginea (Sluiter, 1898)
- Styela cerea Sluiter, 1900: synonym of Asterocarpa humilis (Heller, 1878)
- Styela circumarata Sluiter, 1904: synonym of Polycarpa aurita (Sluiter, 1890)
- Styela clara Hartmeyer, 1906: synonym of Cnemidocarpa clara (Hartmeyer, 1906)
- Styela coerulea (Quoy & Gaimard, 1834): synonym of Asterocarpa coerulea (Quoy & Gaimard, 1834)
- Styela comata (Alder, 1863): synonym of Polycarpa comata (Alder, 1863)
- Styela conica Swederus, 1887: synonym of Styela coriacea (Alder & Hancock, 1848)
- Styela contecta Sluiter, 1904: synonym of Polycarpa contecta (Sluiter, 1904)
- Styela convexa Herdman, 1881: synonym of Cnemidocarpa drygalskii (Hartmeyer, 1911)
- Styela costata (Hartmeyer, 1911): synonym of Styela angularis (Stimpson, 1855)
- Styela cryptocarpa Sluiter, 1885: synonym of Polycarpa obscura Heller, 1878
- Styela curtzei Michaelsen, 1900: synonym of Cnemidocarpa nordenskjöldi (Michaelsen, 1898)
- Styela cylindrica Bonnevie, 1896: synonym of Styela coriacea (Alder & Hancock, 1848)
- Styela cylindriformis Bonnevie, 1896: synonym of Styela coriacea (Alder & Hancock, 1848)
- Styela depressa Alder & Hancock, 1907: synonym of Polycarpa tenera Lacaze-Duthiers & Delage, 1892
- Styela doliolum Bjerkan, 1905: synonym of Styela gelatinosa (Traustedt, 1886)
- Styela drygalskii (Hartmeyer, 1911): synonym of Cnemidocarpa drygalskii (Hartmeyer, 1911)
- Styela elata (Heller, 1878): synonym of Polycarpa papillata Sluiter, 1885
- Styela elsa Hartmeyer, 1906: synonym of Cnemidocarpa clara (Hartmeyer, 1906)
- Styela esther Hartmeyer, 1906: synonym of Cnemidocarpa irene (Hartmeyer, 1906)
- Styela etheridgii Herdman, 1899: synonym of Cnemidocarpa radicosa (Herdman, 1882)
- Styela fertilis Hartmeyer, 1906: synonym of Cnemidocarpa fertilis (Hartmeyer, 1906)
- Styela fibrillata Alder & Hancock, 1907: synonym of Polycarpa comata (Alder, 1863)
- Styela finmarkiensis (Kiaer, 1893): synonym of Cnemidocarpa finmarkiensis (Kiaer, 1893)
- Styela flava Herdman, 1881: synonym of Styela squamosa Herdman, 1881
- Styela flexibilis Sluiter, 1905: synonym of Cnemidocarpa verrucosa (Lesson, 1830)
- Styela floccosa Sluiter, 1904: synonym of Cnemidocarpa floccosa (Sluiter, 1904)
- Styela friabilis Sluiter, 1898: synonym of Polycarpa spongiabilis Traustedt, 1883
- Styela fuliginea Sluiter, 1898: synonym of Polycarpa spongiabilis Traustedt, 1883
- Styela gracilocarpa Millar, 1982: synonym of Styela squamosa Herdman, 1881
- Styela grahami Sluiter, 1905: synonym of Dicarpa insinuosa (Sluiter, 1912)
- Styela grandis Herdman, 1881: synonym of Cnemidocarpa verrucosa (Lesson, 1830)
- Styela granulata (Alder, 1863): synonym of Polycarpa pomaria (Savigny, 1816)
- Styela greeleyi (Ritter, 1899): synonym of Styela clavata (Pallas, 1774)
- Styela grossularia (Beneden, 1846): synonym of Dendrodoa grossularia (Van Beneden, 1846)
- Styela gyrosa Heller, 1877: synonym of Styela plicata (Lesueur, 1823)
- Styela hemicaespitosa Ritter, 1913: synonym of Styela coriacea (Alder & Hancock, 1848)
- Styela humilis Heller, 1878: synonym of Asterocarpa humilis (Heller, 1878)
- Styela hupferi (Michaelsen, 1904): synonym of Distomus hupferi (Michaelsen, 1904)
- Styela incubita Sluiter, 1904: synonym of Cnemidocarpa incubita (Sluiter, 1904)
- Styela informis Forbes, 1848: synonym of Polycarpa pomaria (Savigny, 1816)
- Styela insinuosa (Sluiter, 1912): synonym of Dicarpa insinuosa (Sluiter, 1912)
- Styela insulsa Sluiter, 1898: synonym of Polycarpa insulsa (Sluiter, 1898)
- Styela irene Hartmeyer, 1906: synonym of Cnemidocarpa irene (Hartmeyer, 1906)
- Styela irma (Hartmeyer, 1927): synonym of Cnemidocarpa irene (Hartmeyer, 1906)
- Styela joannae Herdman, 1898: synonym of Cnemidocarpa clara (Hartmeyer, 1906)
- Styela kroboja Oka, 1906: synonym of Polycarpa obscura Heller, 1878
- Styela lactea Herdman, 1881: synonym of Cnemidocarpa verrucosa (Lesson, 1830)
- Styela lapidosa (Herdman, 1891): synonym of Polyandrocarpa lapidosa (Herdman, 1891)
- Styela lineata Traustedt, 1880: synonym of Dendrodoa lineata (Traustedt, 1880)
- Styela lobata Kott, 1952: synonym of Cnemidocarpa lobata (Kott, 1952)
- Styela longata Kott, 1954: synonym of Cnemidocarpa longata (Kott, 1954)
- Styela loveni (Sars, 1851): synonym of Styela coriacea (Alder & Hancock, 1848)
- Styela lovenii (Sars, 1851): synonym of Styela coriacea (Alder & Hancock, 1848)
- Styela macrogastra Oka, 1935: synonym of Styela coriacea (Alder & Hancock, 1848)
- Styela maculata Sanamyan, 1992: synonym of Styela squamosa Herdman, 1881
- Styela maendria Sluiter, 1904: synonym of Styela maendria Sluiter, 1904
- Styela maendria Sluiter, 1904: synonym of Styela maeandria Sluiter, 1904
- Styela mammiculata Carlisle, 1954: synonym of Styela clava Herdman, 1881
- Styela maroccana Sluiter, 1927: synonym of Cnemidocarpa irene (Hartmeyer, 1906)
- Styela marquesana Michaelsen, 1918: synonym of Styela canopus (Savigny, 1816)
- Styela melincae Ärnbäck, 1929: synonym of Styela magalhaensis Michaelsen, 1898
- Styela milleri Ritter, 1907: synonym of Styela squamosa Herdman, 1881
- Styela miniata Sluiter, 1905: synonym of Eusynstyela miniata (Sluiter, 1905)
- Styela mollis (Stimpson, 1852): synonym of Cnemidocarpa mollis (Stimpson, 1852)
- Styela monoceros (Moeller, 1842): synonym of Styela rustica Linnaeus, 1767
- Styela natalensis Sluiter, 1898: synonym of Polycarpa natalensis (Sluiter, 1898)
- Styela nidrosiensis Ärnbäck, 1926: synonym of Styela coriacea (Alder & Hancock, 1848)
- Styela nisiotis Sluiter, 1900: synonym of Cnemidocarpa nisiotis (Sluiter, 1900)
- Styela nivosa Sluiter, 1898: synonym of Polycarpa anguinea (Sluiter, 1898)
- Styela nordenskjöldi Michaelsen, 1898: synonym of Cnemidocarpa nordenskjöldi (Michaelsen, 1898)
- Styela northumbrica Alder & Hancock, 1907: synonym of Styela coriacea (Alder & Hancock, 1848)
- Styela nutrix Sluiter, 1904: synonym of Polycarpa argentata (Sluiter, 1890)
- Styela oblonga Herdman, 1881: synonym of Styela squamosa Herdman, 1881
- Styela obscura Alder & Hancock, 1907: synonym of Polycarpa tenera Lacaze-Duthiers & Delage, 1892
- Styela obtecta (Traustedt, 1883): synonym of Polycarpa spongiabilis Traustedt, 1883
- Styela ohlini Michaelsen, 1898: synonym of Cnemidocarpa ohlini (Michaelsen, 1898)
- Styela oligocarpa Sluiter, 1885: synonym of Cnemidocarpa oligocarpa (Sluiter, 1885)
- Styela olitoria Sluiter, 1890: synonym of Polycarpa olitoria (Sluiter, 1890)
- Styela opalina Alder, 1863: synonym of Polycarpa pomaria (Savigny, 1816)
- Styela orbicularis Sluiter, 1904: synonym of Styela canopus (Savigny, 1816)
- Styela palinorsa Sluiter, 1895: synonym of Polycarpa palinorsa (Sluiter, 1895)
- Styela papillata Kott, 1954: synonym of Polycarpa papillata Sluiter, 1885
- Styela papillata Sluiter, 1885: synonym of Polycarpa papillata Sluiter, 1885
- Styela partita (Stimpson, 1852): synonym of Styela canopus (Savigny, 1816)
- Styela partito (Stimpson, 1852): synonym of Styela canopus (Savigny, 1816)
- Styela patens Sluiter, 1885: synonym of Polycarpa patens (Sluiter, 1885)
- Styela pavementis Kott, 1952: synonym of Cnemidocarpa irene (Hartmeyer, 1906)
- Styela pedata (Herdman, 1881): synonym of Cnemidocarpa pedata (Herdman, 1881)
- Styela personata Herdman, 1899: synonym of Cnemidocarpa personata (Herdman, 1899)
- Styela phaula Sluiter, 1895: synonym of Polycarpa papillata Sluiter, 1885
- Styela pigmentata Herdman, 1906: synonym of Polycarpa pigmentata (Herdman, 1906)
- Styela pinguis Herdman, 1899: synonym of Styela plicata (Lesueur, 1823)
- Styela plata Oka, 1930: synonym of Styela coriacea (Alder & Hancock, 1848)
- Styela pneumonodes Sluiter, 1895: synonym of Polycarpa aurata (Quoy & Gaimard, 1834)
- Styela procera Sluiter, 1885: synonym of Polycarpa procera (Sluiter, 1885)
- Styela prolifera Sluiter, 1905: synonym of Stolonica prolifera Sluiter, 1905
- Styela psoloessa Sluiter, 1890: synonym of Polycarpa aurata (Quoy & Gaimard, 1834)
- Styela pupa Heller, 1878: synonym of Styela canopus (Savigny, 1816)
- Styela pustulosa Sluiter, 1904: synonym of Polycarpa pustulosa (Sluiter, 1904)
- Styela quadrangularis Forbes, 1848: synonym of Polycarpa pomaria (Savigny, 1816)
- Styela quadrata (Herdman, 1882): synonym of Polycarpa quadrata Herdman, 1881
- Styela quidni (Sluiter, 1912): synonym of Styela wandeli (Sluiter, 1911)
- Styela radicata Millar, 1962: synonym of Cnemidocarpa radicata (Millar, 1962)
- Styela radicosa Herdman, 1882: synonym of Cnemidocarpa radicosa (Herdman, 1882)
- Styela ramificata Kott, 1952: synonym of Polycarpa aurita (Sluiter, 1890)
- Styela rectangularis Kott, 1952: synonym of Styela canopus (Savigny, 1816)
- Styela reducta Sluiter, 1904: synonym of Stolonica reducta (Sluiter, 1904)
- Styela reniformis Sluiter, 1904: synonym of Polycarpa reniformis (Sluiter, 1904)
- Styela rhizopus Redikorzev, 1907: synonym of Cnemidocarpa rhizopus (Redikorzev, 1907)
- Styela robusta Sluiter, 1904: synonym of Polycarpa aurita (Sluiter, 1890)
- Styela rotunda Herdman, 1910: synonym of Cnemidocarpa drygalskii (Hartmeyer, 1911)
- Styela rubida Sluiter, 1898: synonym of Polycarpa rubida (Sluiter, 1898)
- Styela rubra (Fewkes, 1889): synonym of Styela montereyensis (Dall, 1872)
- Styela sabulifera Ritter, 1913: synonym of Cnemidocarpa rhizopus (Redikorzev, 1907)
- Styela salebrosa Beniaminson, 1971: synonym of Styela coriacea (Alder & Hancock, 1848)
- Styela sedata Sluiter, 1904: synonym of Cnemidocarpa sedata (Sluiter, 1904)
- Styela seminuda Sluiter, 1898: synonym of Polycarpa spongiabilis Traustedt, 1883
- Styela serpentina (Sluiter, 1912): synonym of Cnemidocarpa pfefferi (Michaelsen, 1898)
- Styela sobria Sluiter, 1904: synonym of Polycarpa sobria (Sluiter, 1904)
- Styela solvens Sluiter, 1895: synonym of Polycarpa olitoria (Sluiter, 1890)
- Styela spectabilis Herdman, 1910: synonym of Cnemidocarpa verrucosa (Lesson, 1830)
- Styela spiralis Sluiter, 1885: synonym of Polycarpa spiralis (Sluiter, 1885)
- Styela spirifera (Herdman, 1899): synonym of Cnemidocarpa verrucosa (Lesson, 1830)
- Styela steineni Michaelsen, 1898: synonym of Cnemidocarpa verrucosa (Lesson, 1830)
- Styela stephensoni Michaelsen, 1934: synonym of Styela canopus (Savigny, 1816)
- Styela stimpsoni Ritter, 1900: synonym of Cnemidocarpa finmarkiensis (Kiaer, 1893)
- Styela stolonifera Herdman, 1899: synonym of Cnemidocarpa stolonifera (Herdman, 1899)
- Styela sulcatula (Alder, 1863): synonym of Polycarpa pomaria (Savigny, 1816)
- Styela thelyphanes Sluiter, 1904: synonym of Polycarpa thelyphanes (Sluiter, 1904)
- Styela tinaktae Van Name, 1918: synonym of Cnemidocarpa tinaktae (Van Name, 1918)
- Styela traustedti Sluiter, 1890: synonym of Cnemidocarpa traustedti (Sluiter, 1890)
- Styela tuberosa (MacGillivray, 1844): synonym of Polycarpa pomaria (Savigny, 1816)
- Styela variabilis Hancock, 1868: synonym of Styela canopus (Savigny, 1816)
- Styela verrucosa (Lesson, 1830): synonym of Cnemidocarpa verrucosa (Lesson, 1830)
- Styela vestita (Alder, 1860): synonym of Cnemidocarpa mollis (Stimpson, 1852)
- Styela violacea (Alder, 1863): synonym of Polycarpa violacea (Alder, 1863)
- Styela whiteleggei (Herdman, 1899): synonym of Cnemidocarpa pedata (Herdman, 1881)
- Styela whiteleggii Herdman, 1899: synonym of Cnemidocarpa pedata (Herdman, 1881)
