= Linacre Professor of Zoology =

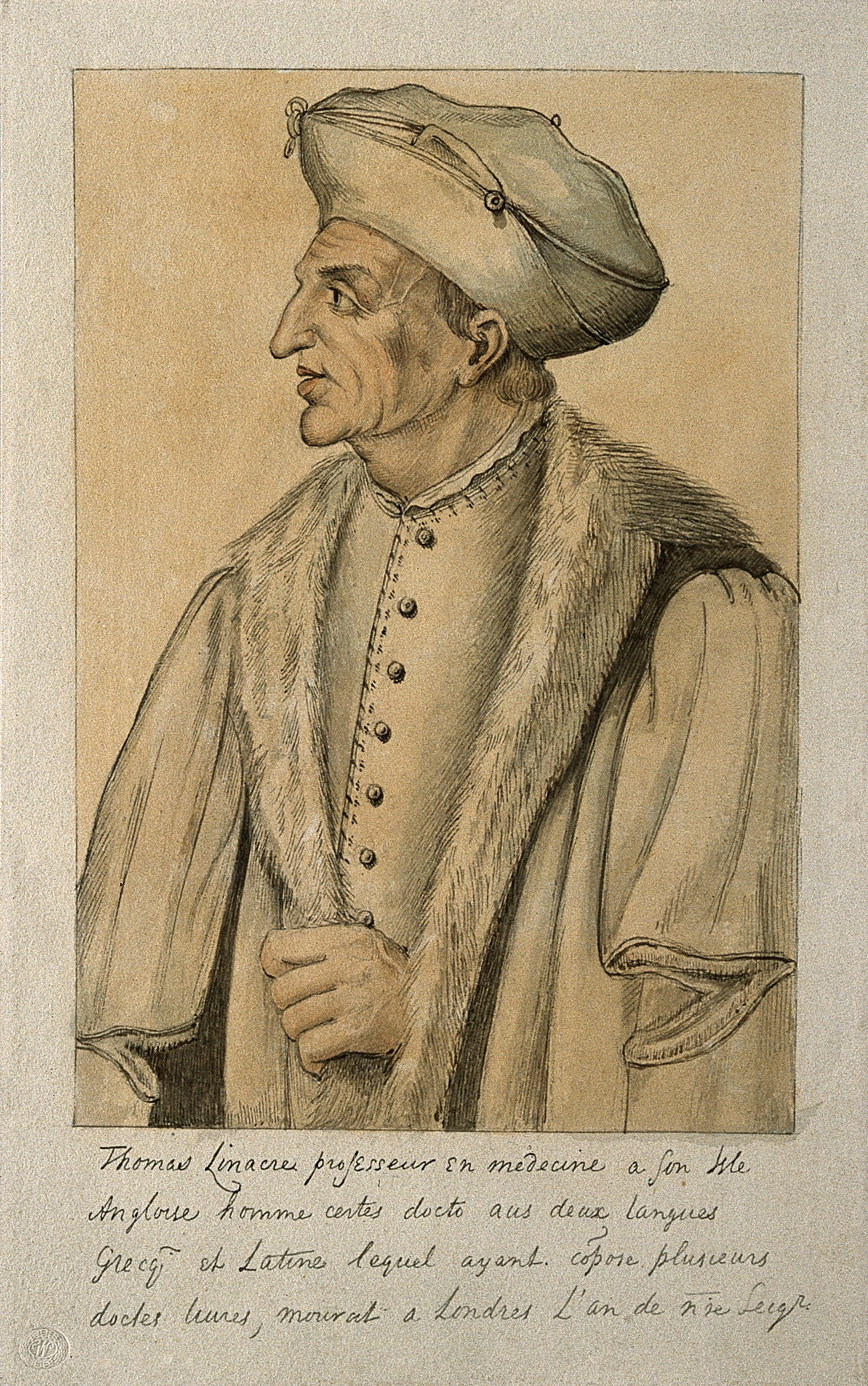
Thomas Linacre. Ink drawing with wash.

The position of Linacre Professor of Zoology at the University of Oxford was founded in 1860, initially as the Linacre Professorship of Physiology and then as the chair of Human and Comparative Anatomy, although its origins can be traced back a further 300 years, to the Linacre Lectureships at Merton College. The post is attached to a fellowship at Merton.

It is named in honour of Thomas Linacre (1460–1524), Physician to Henry VIII and founder of the Royal College of Physicians.

The Linacre Professor is on the Board of Management for the J.W.Jenkinson Memorial Lectureship.

== List of Linacre professors ==
- 1860–1881 George Rolleston
- 1881–1891 Henry Nottidge Moseley
- 1891–1898 Sir Edwin Ray Lankester
- 1899–1906 Walter F.R. Weldon
- 1906–1921 Gilbert C. Bourne
- 1921–1946 Edwin Stephen Goodrich
- 1946–1961 Sir Alister Hardy
- 1961–1979 John William Sutton Pringle
- 1979–1993 Sir Richard Southwood
- 1993–2000 Sir Roy Anderson
- 2002– Peter W. H. Holland
