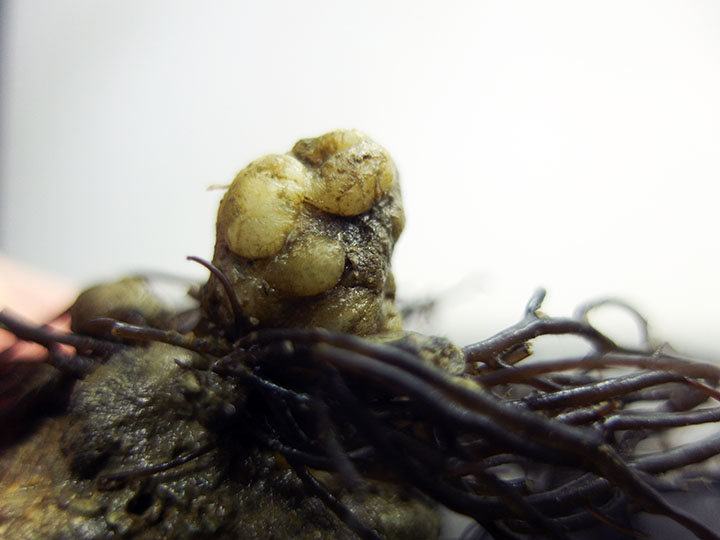

Scientific classification
- Kingdom: Animalia
- Phylum: Chordata
- Subphylum: Tunicata
- Class: Ascidiacea
- Order: Stolidobranchia
- Family: Styelidae
- Genus: Styela
- Species: S. plicata

Binomial name
- Styela plicata Lesuer, 1823

= Styela plicata =

Species of sea squirt

Styela plicata, commonly known as the pleated sea squirt, is a species of tunicate in the family Styelidae. This sessile filter feeder can expel water when threatened.

== Description and life cycle ==
Styela plicata is a solitary tunicate. Tadpole larvae measure around 1.3 millimetres (0.051 in). Adults become sexually mature at around 40 millimetres (1.6 in), and were observed to reach this stage in laboratory after around two months in summer and five months in winter. Individuals live for three to four months after sexual maturity, independently of seasonal variations, and grow to a maximum size of 60 to 80 millimetres (2.4 to 3.1 in). The adults are a grayish or tannish-white color with red or purple stripes on the siphon. Unlike the similar species in the genus, such as Styela clava and Styela montereyensis, S. plicata does not have a stalk in its adult form.

== Distribution ==
In spite of Styela plicata's broad geographical distribution, its native range is still unclear. In 2021, an analysis of 368 individuals for the COI marker genes and 315 for the ANT marker gene from 17 worldwide locations revealed that S. plicata has been present in all studied oceans for a long time. Recurrent colonization events and occasional shuffling among populations have determined the actual genetic structure of this species.

Though the native range of S. plicata is unclear, the prevailing hypothesis is that they originated in the Northwest of the Pacific Ocean and then spread to other warm-water and tropical water bodies by ship fouling. As of 2021, genetic analyses remained inconclusive to either support or refute this hypothesis.

The range of Styela plicata has greatly expanded due to its ability to hitch a ride on ships' hulls. Long-distance dispersal of S. plicata most likely takes place through international shipping, while short-distance local dispersals take place through recreational boating and local traffic.

Preventative measures include anti-fouling paints, wood preservation, and slime control containing tributyltin.

== Habitat ==
This species can live in a wide range of conditions, in waters from 10° to 30 °C and salinities between 22%-34%. They also tolerate pollution and brackish water. The different life cycle stages of Styela plicata have different habitat requirements for survival. The larval and juvenile stages of Styela plicata live on marinas and docks, oyster reefs, rocks and coarse woody debris; adults prefer marinas, docks and hard rocky substrates. Styela plicata can also live in coral reef habitats, and is found from the low intertidal zone to depths of 30 metres.
