= Linda Holland =

Evolutionary biologist

Linda Z. Holland
- Education: University of California, San Diego
- Scientific career
- Thesis: Evolution of the chordate body plan : amphioxus (Branchiostoma floridae) as a stand-in for the ancestral vertebrate (2001)

Linda Zimmerman Holland is a research biologist at Scripps Institution of Oceanography known for her work examining the evolution of vertebrates.

== Education and career ==
Holland has a B.A. (1962) and an M.A. (1964) from Stanford University. She worked as a research associate at the University of California, San Diego, Scripps Clinic, and Scripps Institution of Oceanography in the period from 1970 until 1998. She earned her Ph.D. from the University of California, San Diego in 2001. She started as a research biologist at Scripps in 1998, and is emeritus as of 2022. Linda Holland has described in detail some of the early obstacles she faced as a woman scientist starting out in academe in the 1960s and 1970s,

== Research ==
Holland's early research examined anatomical structures in purple sea urchins (Strongylocentrotus purpuratus), and a protein involved in clotting, Von Willebrand factor. She went on to examine reproduction in sea urchins, salps, and amphioxus, known as lancelet. Holland began collecting amphioxus in Tampa, Florida in 1988, which enabled her to use them as a model system to study evolutionary biology. Holland was the lead scientist on the project analyzing the genome of amphioxus, and her work revealed reuse and copying of genes by amphioxus. Her research also addressed the evolution of bilaterian animals as in her 2013 Holland et al. publication (see image). In 2017 she wrote a history of the use of amphioxus in biological research.

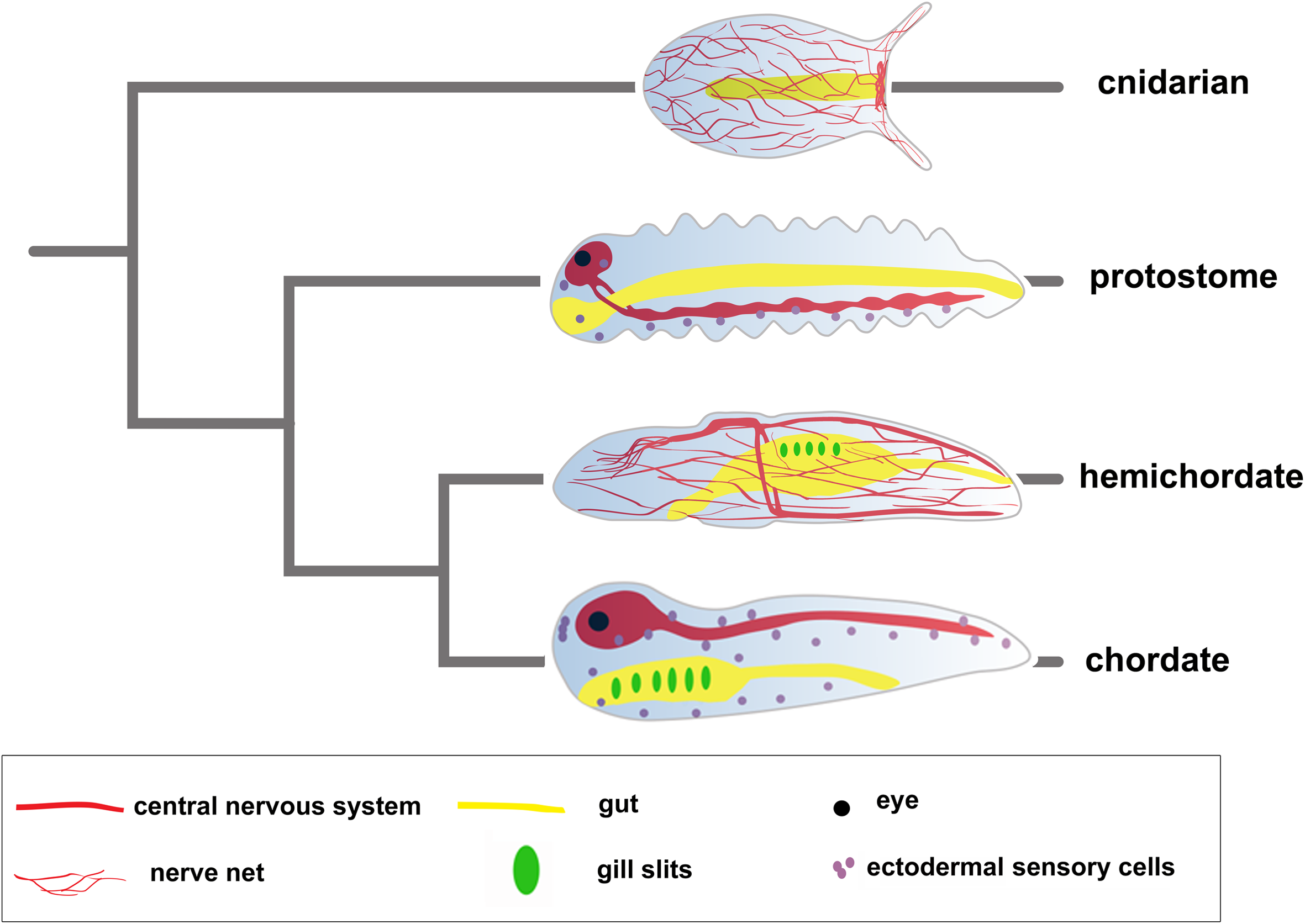
A typical cnidarian polyp, a generalized protostome, hemichordate and chordate and their phylogenetic relations are shown. Special attention is given to nervous systems and neural structures of the respective animals (Holland et al. 2013)

== Selected publications ==
- Putnam, Nicholas H.; Butts, Thomas; Ferrier, David E. K.; Furlong, Rebecca F.; Hellsten, Uffe; Kawashima, Takeshi; Robinson-Rechavi, Marc; Shoguchi, Eiichi; Terry, Astrid; Yu, Jr-Kai; Benito-Gutiérrez, E`lia (2008). "The amphioxus genome and the evolution of the chordate karyotype". Nature. 453 (7198): 1064–1071. Bibcode:2008Natur.453.1064P. doi:10.1038/nature06967. ISSN 0028-0836. PMID 18563158. S2CID 4418548.
- Holland, Linda Z.; Albalat, Ricard; Azumi, Kaoru; Benito-Gutiérrez, Èlia; Blow, Matthew J.; Bronner-Fraser, Marianne; Brunet, Frederic; Butts, Thomas; Candiani, Simona; Dishaw, Larry J.; Ferrier, David E. K. (2008-07-01). "The amphioxus genome illuminates vertebrate origins and cephalochordate biology". Genome Research. 18 (7): 1100–1111. doi:10.1101/gr.073676.107. ISSN 1088-9051. PMC 2493399. PMID 18562680.
- Holland, L.Z.; Kene, M.; Williams, N.A.; Holland, N.D. (1997-05-01). "Sequence and embryonic expression of the amphioxus engrailed gene (AmphiEn): the metameric pattern of transcription resembles that of its segment-polarity homolog in Drosophila". Development. 124 (9): 1723–1732. doi:10.1242/dev.124.9.1723. ISSN 0950-1991. PMID 9165120.
- Yu, Jr-Kai; Satou, Yutaka; Holland, Nicholas D.; Shin-I, Tadasu; Kohara, Yuji; Satoh, Noriyuki; Bronner-Fraser, Marianne; Holland, Linda Z. (2007). "Axial patterning in cephalochordates and the evolution of the organizer". Nature. 445 (7128): 613–617. doi:10.1038/nature05472. ISSN 0028-0836. PMID 17237766. S2CID 4337940.

== Awards and honors ==
In 2014 Holland, and her husband Nick Holland, received the A.O. Kovalevsky Medal for their work on amphioxus. This award also includes being named an honorary member of the Saint Petersburg Society of Naturalists.
