= Wilhelm Roux =

German zoologist (1850–1924)

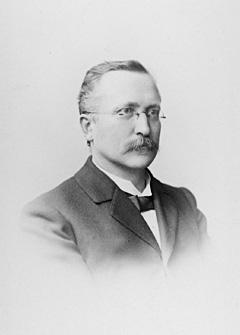
- Wilhelm Roux
- Born: 9 June 1850; Jena, German Confederation
- Died: 15 September 1924 (aged 74)
- Education: Jena, Strasbourg, Berlin
- Known for: Mosaic theory of ontogeny
- Scientific career
- Fields: Zoology, anatomy embryology, cell biology

Wilhelm Roux (9 June 1850 – 15 September 1924) was a German zoologist and pioneer of experimental embryology.

== Early life ==
Roux was born and educated in Jena, German Confederation where he attended university and studied under Ernst Haeckel. He also attended university in Berlin and Strasbourg and studied under Gustav Albert Schwalbe, Friedrich Daniel von Recklinghausen, and Rudolf Virchow. Although he was trained as a clinical doctor, he spent his career in experimental biology. His doctoral thesis on the embryological development of blood vessels was a seminal early study in biophysical modelling, a milestone in the study of the cardiovascular system.

== Career and research ==
For ten years Roux worked in Breslau (now Wrocław), becoming director of his own Institute of Embryology in 1879. He was professor at Innsbruck, Austria from 1889 to 1895, then accepted a professorial chair at the Anatomical Institute of the University of Halle, a post he retained until 1921.

Roux's research was based upon the notion of Entwicklungsmechanik or developmental mechanics: he investigated the mechanisms of functional adaptations of bones, cartilage, and tendons to malformation and disease. His methodology was to interfere with developing embryos and observe the outcome. Roux's investigations were performed mainly on frogs' eggs to research the earliest structures in amphibian development. His goal was to show Darwinian processes at work on the cellular level.

Combined with the rediscovery of Gregor Mendel's 1866 paper on heritable elements in peas, these results highlighted the central role of the chromosomes in carrying heritable material. In cell division the cell divides into two halves with equal number of chromosomes which are similar to parent cell and are diploid in nature.

In 1885 Roux removed a section of the medullary plate of an embryonic chicken and tamed it in a warm saline solution for 13 days, establishing the principle of tissue culture which would later be taken up by Ross Granville Harrison and Paul Alfred Weiss.

In 1888, Roux published the results of a series of defect experiments in which he took 2 and 4 cell frog embryos and killed half of the cells of each embryo with a hot needle. He reported that they grew into half-embryos and surmised that the separate function of the two cells had already been determined. This led him to propose his "Mosaic" theory of epigenesis: after a few cell divisions the embryo would be like a mosaic, each cell playing its own unique part in the entire design.

After a few years Roux's theory was refuted by the studies of his colleague Hans Driesch and later, with more precision, Hans Spemann showed that, as a rule, Driesch's conclusions were correct, but that results like Roux's may be obtained after intervention in certain planes. Despite this early lapse into a fallacy of reductionism, Roux's pioneering mechanical methodology was to prove most fruitful in 20th century biology.

In 1913, Roux was named an honorary member of the American Association for Anatomy.

== Works ==
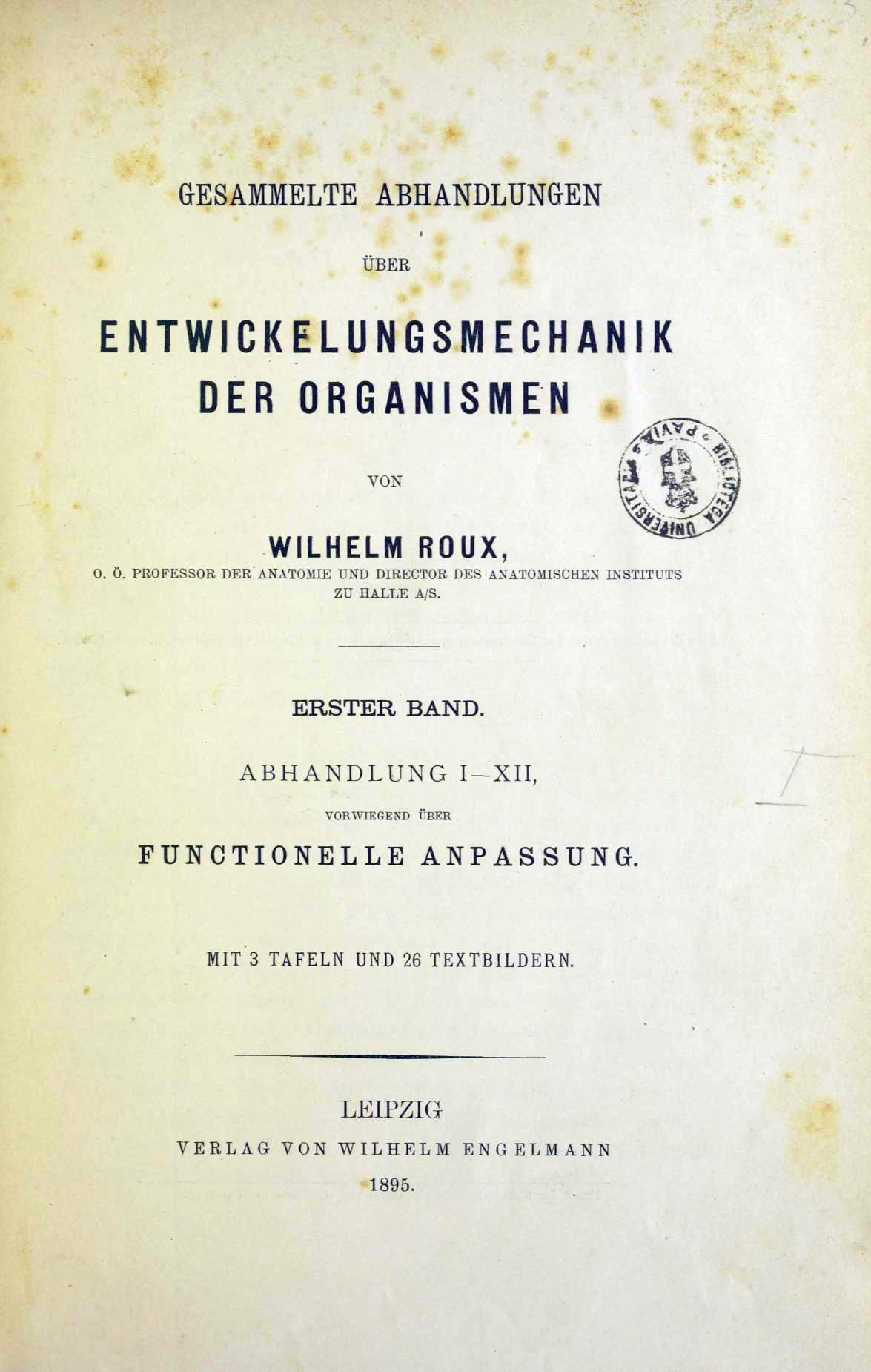
Gesammelte Abhandlungen über Entwickelungsmechanik der Organismen, 1895

- Der Kampf der Teile im Organismus (1881)
- Beiträge zur Entwinckelungsmechanik des Embryo (1885)
- Über die Entwicklungsmechanik der Organismen (1890)
- Geschichtliche Abhandlung über Entwicklungsmechanik (two volumes, 1895)
- Gesammelte Abhandlungen über Entwickelungsmechanik der Organismen (in German). Leipzig: Wilhelm Engelmann. 1895.
- Über die Bedeutung geringer Verschiedenheiten der relativen Grösse der Furchungszellen für den Charakter des Furchungsschemas (in German). Halle: Carl August Schwetschke. 1896.
- Die Entwicklungsmechanik (1905)
- Terminologie der Entwicklungsmechanik (1912).

== See also ==
- Cell culture

== Literature ==
- Kurz, H; Sandau, K; Christ, B (1997), "On the bifurcation of blood vessels—Wilhelm Roux's doctoral thesis (Jena 1878)--a seminal work for biophysical modelling in developmental biology.", Ann. Anat., vol. 179, no. 1 (published Feb 1997), pp. 33–6, doi:10.1016/s0940-9602(97)80132-x, PMID 9059737
- Hamburger, V (1997), "Wilhelm Roux: visionary with a blind spot.", Journal of the History of Biology, vol. 30, no. 2, pp. 229–38, doi:10.1023/A:1004231618837, PMID 11619471, S2CID 35621734
- Ribatti, Domenico (2002), "A milestone in the study of the vascular system: Wilhelm Roux's doctoral thesis on the bifurcation of blood vessels.", Haematologica, vol. 87, no. 7 (published Jul 2002), pp. 677–8, PMID 12091116
- Kirschner, Stefan (2003), "[Wilhelm Roux's concept of 'developmental mechanics']", Würzburger medizinhistorische Mitteilungen / Im Auftrage der Würzburger medizinhistorischen Gesellschaft und in Verbindung mit dem Institut für Geschichte der Medizin der Universität Würzburg, vol. 22, pp. 67–80, PMID 15637801
