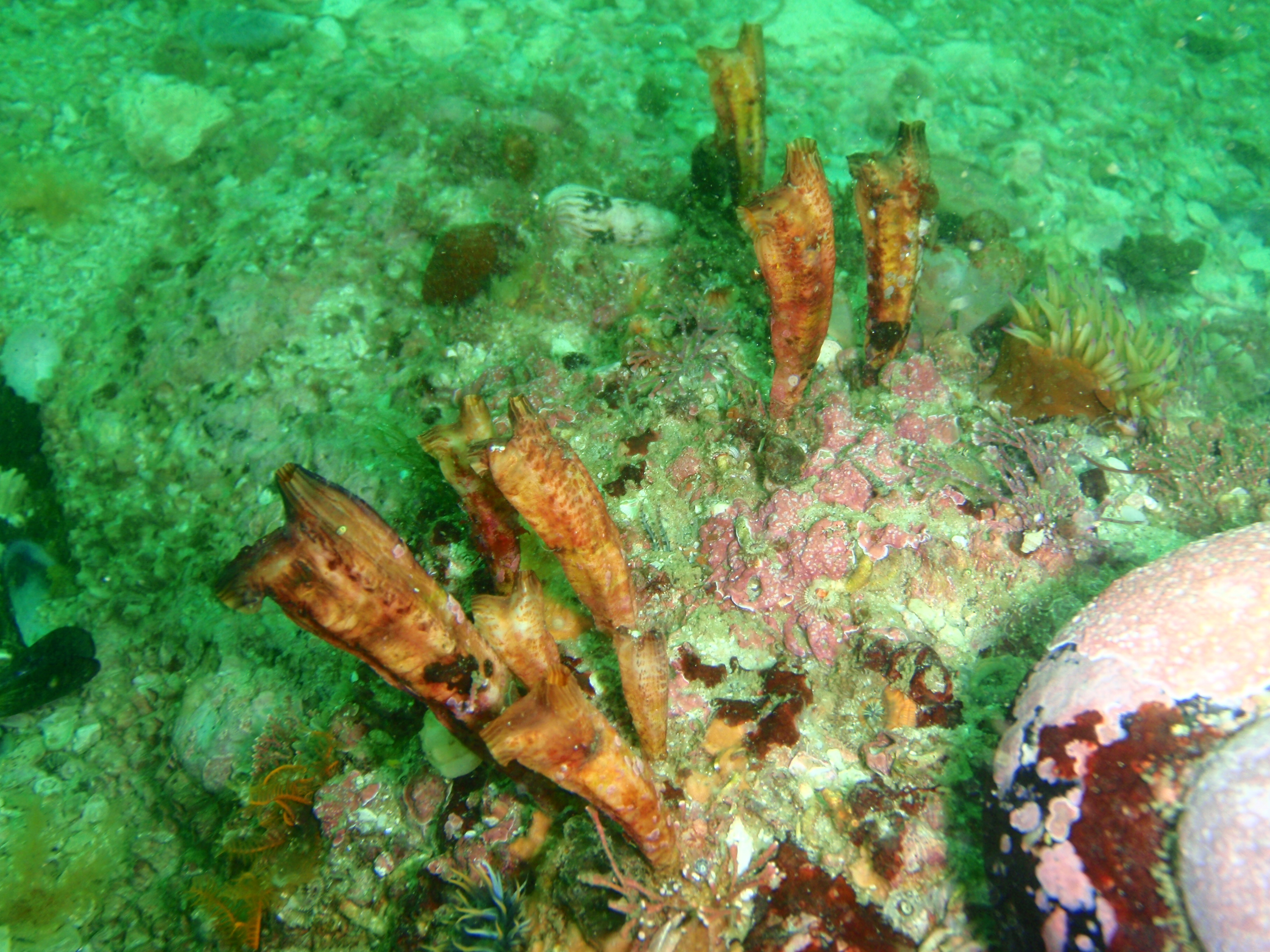

Scientific classification
- Domain: Eukaryota
- Kingdom: Animalia
- Phylum: Chordata
- Subphylum: Tunicata
- Class: Ascidiacea
- Order: Stolidobranchia
- Family: Styelidae
- Genus: Styela
- Species: S. angularis

Binomial name
- Styela angularis (Stimpson, 1855)

Synonyms
- Cynthia angularis Stimpson, 1855; Tethyum costatum Hartmeyer, 1911; Styela costata (Hartmeyer, 1911)

= Styela angularis =

Species of sea squirt

Styela angularis (angular sea squirt) is a solitary, hermaphroditic ascidian tunicate that is found along the coast of Southern Africa from Lüderitz Bay in Namibia to the Eastern Cape.

== Description ==
Order of 100 millimetres (3.9 in) tall, with a tough flexible opaque hexagonal test tapering down to a narrow base peduncle. Stands upright on the substrate. Cloacal siphon terminal, and oral siphon slightly ventral and posterior.

== Behaviour ==
Occurs singly on rocks or other hard surfaces where water is clean and fairly fast moving. Often covered by epibionts.
