= Mary E. Rice =

American invertebrate zoologist (1926–2021)

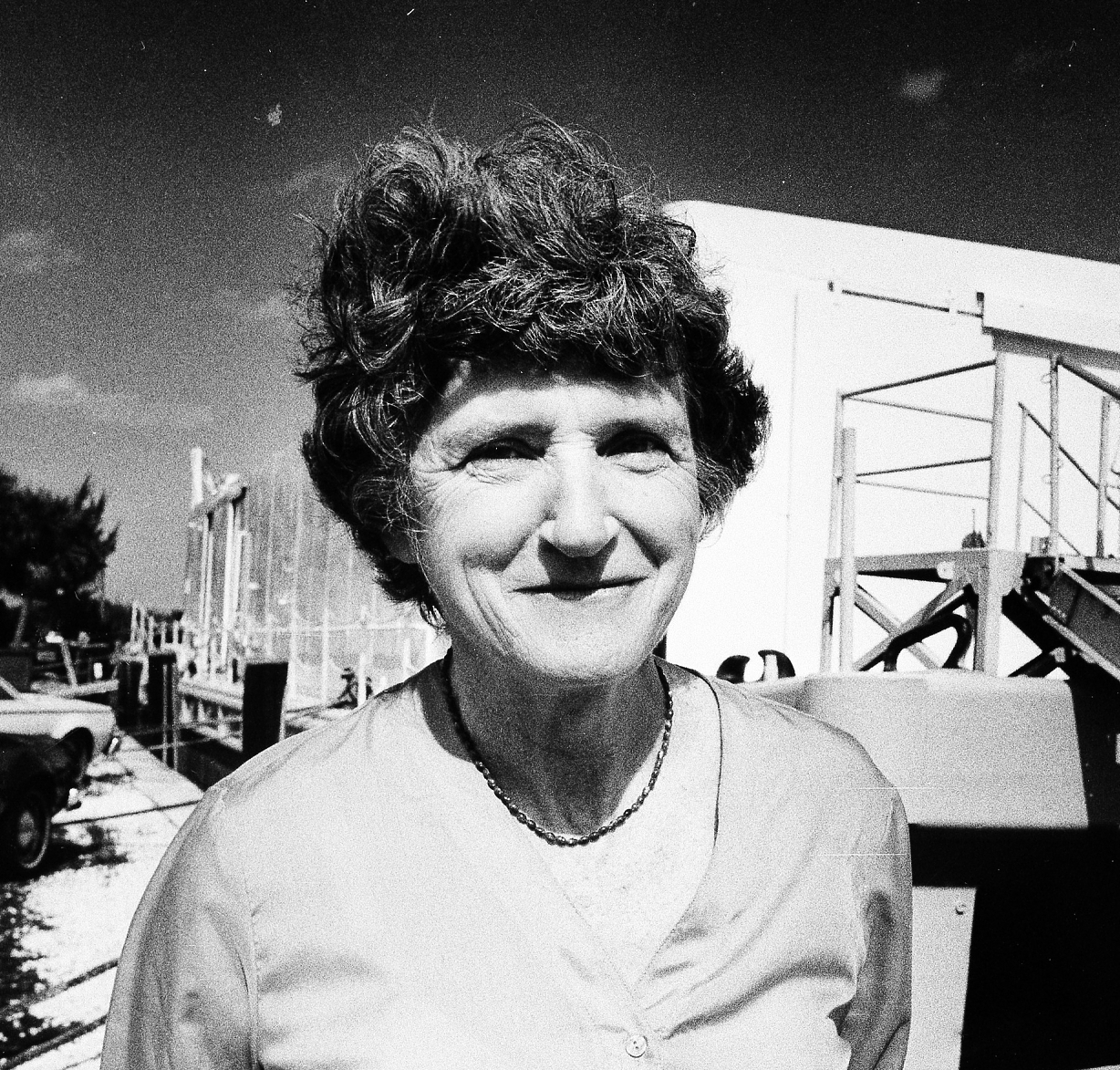
- Rice in 1984 at Smithsonian Marine Station floating lab
- Born: August 3, 1926
- Died: April 29, 2021 (aged 94)
- Education: Drew University; Oberlin College; University of Washington
- Awards: 2019 St. Petersburg Society of Naturalists, A.O. Kovalevsky Medal for Extraordinary Achievements in Evolutionary Developmental Biology and Comparative Zoology
- Scientific career
- Fields: Invertebrate Zoology
- Workplaces: Columbia University; University of Washington; National Museum of Natural History; Smithsonian Marine Station

Mary Esther Rice (August 3, 1926 – April 29, 2021) was an American invertebrate zoologist specializing in systematics, evolution and the development of marine invertebrates. She worked at the Smithsonian Institution as a curator, educator, research advisor, and administrator from 1966 until her retirement in 2002. She is known for her work on the life histories of Sipuncula, as well as for serving as the first director of the Smithsonian Marine Station at Fort Pierce.

== Biography and education ==
Mary E. Rice was born in Washington, D.C., on August 3, 1926, to Daniel Gibbons Rice and Florence Catherine Pyles Rice. She grew up on a farm in southern Maryland and attended school in Oxon Hill.

In 1947, Rice graduated from Drew University in Madison, New Jersey, with an A.B. in Biology. She first attended graduate school at Oberlin College in Ohio, earning an M.A. in zoology in 1949. Rice then returned to New Jersey to teach biology at Drew.

In 1950, Rice began working as a research associate at Columbia University's Department of Radiology. She left Columbia in 1953 to accept an appointment as a general physiologist at the National Institutes of Health's National Institute of Arthritis and Metabolic Diseases. In 1955, she advanced to the position of biologist at the National Cancer Institute.

Rice decided in 1961 to pursue a PhD in zoology at the University of Washington, Seattle, studying the development and phylogeny of sipunculan worms.

Upon completion of her PhD in 1966, Rice was appointed curator and research zoologist in the National Museum of Natural History's Department of Invertebrate Zoology. In charge of curating the sipunculan and echiuran collections, Rice devoted her career to the study of Sipuncula, focusing her research on their evolution and development.

In 1981, Rice became director of the Smithsonian Marine Station at Fort Pierce, Florida. When she retired in 2002 after thirty-six years at the Smithsonian Institution, Rice was named senior research scientist emeritus at the Smithsonian Marine Station. She continued researching sipunculan worms in her retirement.

== Administrative career ==
As the founding director of the Smithsonian Institution Marine Station at Link Port, Mary E. Rice guided its growth into a major research center by developing research laboratories and programs and securing support for research fellowships. In 1999, the facility was moved to an eight-acre campus at Seaway Drive. The expanded facility was renamed the Smithsonian Marine Station at Fort Pierce.

== Educational career ==
Over the course of her career, Mary E. Rice was affiliated with several universities. She served as an adjunct associate professor at the University of Miami (1968–1974) and the George Washington University (1970–1975). She was also an affiliate professor of biology at George Mason University (1994–2000) and a member of the graduate faculty at the Florida Institute of Technology (1996–2000). Rice mentored many students, including those developing the Evo-Devo approach, and advised over thirty postdoctoral fellows and eight short-term graduate fellows. She served as a committee member for thirteen doctoral candidates.

Rice was also responsible for the creation of the Smithsonian Marine Ecosystem Exhibit. Working with nearby officials, she developed the St. Lucie County Marine Center, a county-run facility where the exhibit is housed. Located opposite the Smithsonian Marine Station, the focal point of the exhibit is an enormous 3,300-gallon coral reef aquarium that was previously displayed at the National Museum of Natural History in Washington.

== Publications ==
Rice's first publication, “The influence of glycolytic factors on the potassium and sodium content of Saccaromyces cerevisiae”, was co-written in 1951 with G. T. Scott and M. A. Jacobson. It concerned the physiological effects of sodium on yeast.

Rice's first sipunculan paper appeared in 1967, and was entitled “A comparative study of the development of Phascolosoma agassizii, Golfingia pligettensis, and Themiste pyroides with a discussion of developmental patterns in the Sipuncula”.

Rice wrote or co-wrote over eighty papers in total, most on the classification, development and evolution of the class Sipuncula.

== Honors and awards ==
Rice served as president of the American Society of Zoologists and the American Microscopical Society. She was also an elected fellow of the American Association for the Advancement of Science. In 2019 she was awarded the A.O. Kovalevsky Medal for extraordinary achievements in evolutionary developmental biology and comparative zoology by the St. Petersburg Society of Naturalists.
