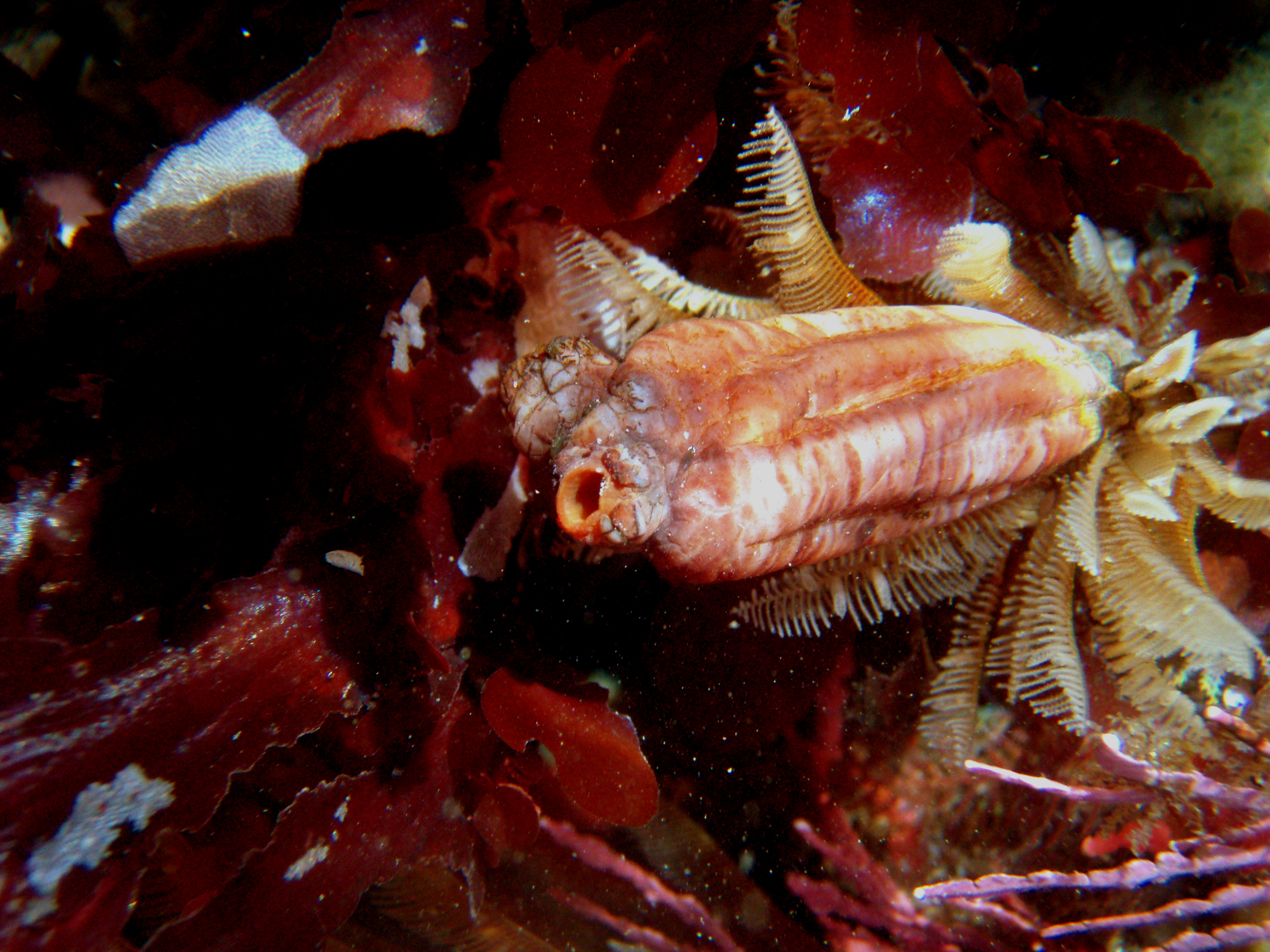
- Styela montereyensis in a California tide pool

Scientific classification
- Kingdom: Animalia
- Phylum: Chordata
- Subphylum: Tunicata
- Class: Ascidiacea
- Order: Stolidobranchia
- Family: Styelidae
- Genus: Styela
- Species: S. montereyensis

Binomial name
- Styela montereyensis (Dall, 1872)

Synonyms
- Clavelinopsis rubra Fewkes, 1889; Cynthia montereyensis Dall, 1872; Styela rubra (Fewkes, 1889); Tethyum montereyense (Dall, 1872); Tethyum montereyensis

= Styela montereyensis =

Species of tunicate

Styela montereyensis, also called the stalked tunicate, Monterey stalked tunicate, and the long-stalked sea squirt is a solitary ascidian tunicate. It has a cylindrical, yellow to dark reddish-brown body and a thin trunk that anchors it to rocks. It is found in subtidal areas of the western coast of North America from Vancouver Island to Baja California.

== Taxonomy ==
The species was first described by American malacologist William Healey Dall in 1871 as Cynthia montereyensis, and later (1889) by Jesse Walter Fewkes as Clavelinopsis rubra. William E. Ritter placed it in Styela in 1893.

== Description ==
Styela montereyensis is yellow to dark red brown in colour. It is a solitary species, growing, often in loose groups. It normally grows to about 8–15 cm (3–6 in) in exposed sites. However, in the more rare, calm habitats, it can grow up to about 25 cm (10 in). The body of Styela montereyensis is elongate and cylindrical, and is attached to a thinner stalk approximately the same length as the body. Its siphons are close together at the distal end, with its oral siphon pointing to the side or downward. The atrial siphon points straight upward. It has a leathery tunic displaying noticeable longitudinal grooves and ridges that extend down the entire length of the body.

This species is commonly fouled with foreign matter and small organisms such as algae and hydroids when occurring in harbors, but remains clean in wave-swept habitats. The feeding mechanism of S. montereyensis uses the force generated from underwater current to push water through a feeding apparatus. The flexible stem allows the organism to have its position adjusted passively and the orientation of the siphons optimized by the current, and so foraging is a relatively low-energy activity. Styela montereyensis typically conforms osmotically to their environment due to its limited hyperosmotic capacity, which allows it to adapt to varying salinities in their environment. Their maximum lifespan is not known with certainty, but one individual was known to have lived for three years and attained a length of 23 cm (9.1 in).

== Distribution ==
This species occurs from Vancouver Island and Hope Island south to Baja California.

== Habitat ==
Styela montereyensis lives in the low intertidal zone up to approximately 30 m (100 ft) in depth. It is a fairly common species within its range, and can be found firmly attached to substrata, pilings, jetties, and on subtidal reefs in waters ranging from calm to extremely rough.

Specimens in the Pacific Northwest rarely occur in inland waters, but are normally found in the outer straits and open coast. Populations on the west coasts of Vancouver Island and Washington harbour the crustacean copepod species Pygodelphys aquilonaris in their branchial sacs.
