= Peter Holland (zoologist) =

Zoologist

- Born: August 17, 1963 (age 63)
- Citizenship: British
- Education: Marple Hall School; MA, The Queen's College, Oxford; PhD, National Institute for Medical Research, London, 1987
- Spouse: Amanda Susan Horsfall (married 1996)
- Awards: ZSL Scientific Medal, 1996; De Snoo van ’t Hoogerhuijs Medal, 1999; FRS, 2003; Genetics Society Medal, 2004; Blaise Pascal Medal, 2005; A.O. Kovalevsky Medal, 2006; Linnean Medal, 2012; ZSL Frink Medal, 2015; Darwin Medal, 2019
- Scientific career
- Fields: Zoology
- Workplaces: University of Oxford, University of Reading
- Website: zoo-pholland.zoo.ox.ac.uk/people/holland

Peter William Harold Holland FRS (born 17 August 1963) is a zoologist whose research focuses on how the evolution of animal diversity can be explained through evolution of the genome. He is the current Linacre Professor of Zoology at the University of Oxford, and a Fellow of Merton College, Oxford.

== Life and career ==
After graduating in Zoology from The Queen's College, University of Oxford, in 1984 and obtaining a doctorate in genetics at the National Institute for Medical Research in 1987, Peter Holland held a series of research posts including a Royal Society University Research Fellowship. He became professor of zoology at the University of Reading in 1994 at the age of 30. In 2002 he was elected as a Fellow of Merton College and appointed as the 11th Linacre Professor of Zoology at the University of Oxford, where he was head of the Department of Zoology from 2011 to 2016. He was elected to Fellowship of the Royal Society (FRS) in 2003.

Peter Holland was a Trustee of the Marine Biological Association from 1998 to 2018, and Research Committee Chair. He became a Trustee of the Earlham Institute in 2019 and became chair of the board of trustees in 2022.

== Publications ==
- Essential Developmental Biology, 1993 (as co-editor)
- The Evolution of Developmental Mechanisms, 1994 (as joint editor)
- Swifter than the Arrow: Wilfred Bartrop, football and war, 2009
- The Animal Kingdom: A Very Short Introduction, 2011. Also published in Japanese in 2014 under the title 動物たちの世界六億年の進化をたどる (The world of animals: tracing 600 million years of evolution), and in Arabic in 2016 as المملكة الحيوانية: مقدمة قصيرة جدًّا.
