= Rudolf Raff =

American biologist (1941–2019)

Rudy Raff
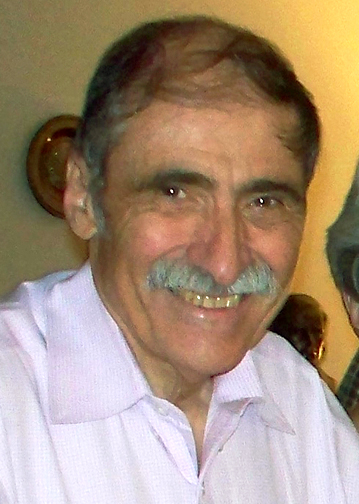
- Raff in 2011
- Born: November 10, 1941; Shawinigan, Québec, Canada
- Died: January 5, 2019 (aged 77); Bloomington, Indiana, United States
- Education: Pennsylvania State University; Duke University
- Awards: A.O. Kovalevsky Medal (2001); Fellow of the American Association for the Advancement of Science (2010); Fellow of the American Academy of Arts and Sciences (2000); Guggenheim Fellowship (1987)
- Scientific career
- Fields: Evolutionary developmental biology
- Workplaces: Indiana University, National Naval Medical Center, Massachusetts Institute of Technology

Rudolf Albert Raff (November 10, 1941 – January 5, 2019) was an American biologist, and the James H. Rudy Professor of Biology at Indiana University. He was renowned for his research in, and promotion of, evolutionary developmental biology. Additionally, he served as the director of the Indiana Molecular Biology Institute.

== Life ==
Raff was born in Shawnigan, Quebec in 1941 to a family of Jewish immigrants from Eastern Europe. He graduated from Pennsylvania State University with a B.S. in 1963, and from Duke University with a Ph.D. in 1967. He died in 2019 in Bloomington Hospital, Indiana, at the age of 77.

== Awards ==
Raff was a 1987 Guggenheim Fellow. He won the 2004 Sewall Wright Award, and won the A.O. Kovalevsky Medal in 2001. He was a Fellow of the American Association for the Advancement of Science.

== Works ==
- with Thomas C. Kaufman, Illustrated by E.C. Raff, Embryos, Genes, and Evolution: The Developmental-Genetic Basis of Evolutionary Change, Macmillan 1983, ISBN 0-02-397500-8
- The shape of life: genes, development, and the evolution of animal form, University of Chicago Press, 1996, ISBN 978-0-226-70266-7
- William R. Jeffery, Rudolf A. Raff (eds), Time, space, and pattern in embryonic development, A.R. Liss, 1983, ISBN 978-0-8451-2201-3
- Rudolf A. Raff, Once We All Had Gills, Growing Up Evolutionist in an Evolving World, Indiana University Press 2012, ISBN 978-0-253-00235-8
