= Smithsonian Marine Station at Fort Pierce =

The Smithsonian Marine Station at Fort Pierce is a research center that specializes in Floridian marine ecosystems and lifeforms. The research is focused mostly on the Indian River Lagoon and also on the offshore waters of Florida's central and east coast. The first director of the station was Mary Rice, who was also instrumental in its founding.

The station is a part of the National Museum of Natural History, which is part of the Smithsonian Institution of Washington, D.C. Its purpose is to be a field station which will draw scientists and students from the Smithsonian and other institutions from around the world, in which they will investigate animals, plants, and physical processes of oceans and rivers. The information obtained at the station will be published in forms and scientific journals.

It also provides administrative and logistical management of the Caribbean Coral Reef Ecosystems Program, that is based at the Carrie Bow Cay Field Station. Both stations are important to the Smithsonian Marine Science Network.

== Smithsonian Marine Ecosystems Exhibit ==
One of the key features of the SMS is the Smithsonian Marine Ecosystems Exhibit. Their focus is on displaying ecosystems as complex communities of organisms interacting in their environment. At the Marine Ecosystems Exhibit, visitors can explore six different Florida marine habitats and learn about the complexity and importance of marine ecosystems. The largest aquarium is a model of a Caribbean coral reef. Other displays include living models of seagrass, mangrove, estuarine and nearshore habitats, as well as a deepwater Oculina coral reef. There are several smaller aquarium displays and a touch tank where you can meet some local sea creatures.
