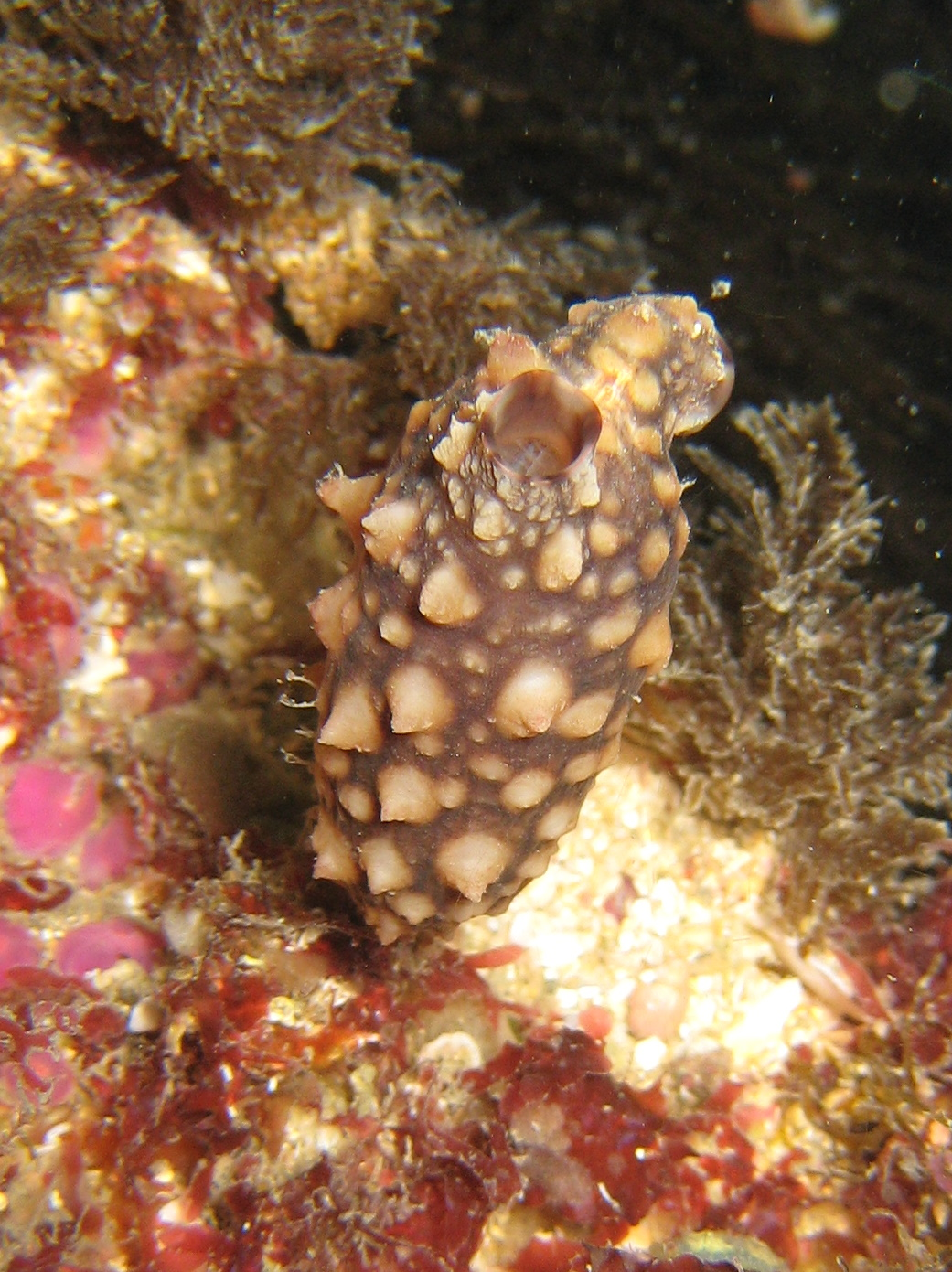

Scientific classification
- Kingdom: Animalia
- Phylum: Chordata
- Subphylum: Tunicata
- Class: Ascidiacea
- Order: Stolidobranchia
- Family: Styelidae
- Genus: Styela
- Species: S. clava

Binomial name
- Styela clava Herdman, 1881

= Styela clava =

Species of sea squirt

Styela clava is a solitary, subtidal ascidian tunicate. It has a variety of common names such as the stalked sea squirt, clubbed tunicate, Asian tunicate, leathery sea squirt, or rough sea squirt. As its common names suggest, S. clava is club-shaped with an elongated oval body and a long peduncle for attaching to a substrate. Although native to the northwestern waters of the Pacific Ocean, S. clava has become an increasingly successful invasive species outside of its native range since the 1900s. It is edible.

== Morphology ==
S. clava is a solitary tunicate. Including both the club-shaped body and peduncle, larger specimens of S. clava can have a maximum length of around 130 mm (5.1 in) while smaller specimens only reach 30 mm (1.2 in) in length. Smaller specimens tend to lack a distinct peduncle. As described by some of its common names, S. clava has a tough, wrinkled or irregularly grooved skin and comes in two variations of color dependent on size. Larger specimens have a light brown body and a darker brown peduncle while smaller specimen are yellow-brown.

== Habitat ==
S. clava is a marine invertebrate animal. Adults are entirely sessile, growing attached to hard subtidal substrata as deep as 25 meters (82 ft). They can be found on virtually any hard surface such as rocks, buoys, pilings and shells of mussels. S. clava is predominant in the littoral zone, preferring sheltered localities free of strong wave action and floating objects, making artificial surfaces in harbors and marinas exceptional habitats.

It is a hardy species that can live in a wide range of temperatures from -2 °C to 27 °C and can tolerate high salinity waters (26% - 28% salinity) that would be lethal to other tunicate species.

== Reproduction ==
Like most tunicates, S. clava is hermaphroditic and produces short-lived pelagic lecithotrophic larvae. They reproduce externally via broadcast spawning, and the reproductive period is highly dependent on sea surface temperatures reaching a critical temperature threshold, between 16 °C and 20°C. The reproductive period can vary from 4 to 10 months depending on location. Along the Californian coast in the United States, the reproduction period occurs for 4 months from June to September, while in Denmark and England, the reproduction period is also 4 months but occurs from July to October.

== Native Range ==
S. clava is native to the northwestern waters of the Pacific, particularly the seas and coasts of Japan and Korea, to Siberia, and as far south as the coast off Shanghai, China.

== Invasions ==
Outside of its native range, S. clava has proven to be an increasingly successful invasive species due to its physiological adaptations and environmental tolerances. S. clava's thick tunic, relative to native tunicates, provides better protection from potential predators and helps prevent desiccation. It can withstand subzero to 23 °C sea temperatures and high salinity water, giving it strong tolerance to environmental changes in water. The lack of a natural predator already gives S. clava an advantage over native tunicates, but their large size also allows them to outcompete other filter-feeding species such as oysters or mussels for food and substrate space.

=== Range ===
Since the mid-1900s, S. clava has been unintentionally introduced globally to temperate coastal waters outside of its native range. It has successfully established stable populations on both coasts of North America, Europe, New Zealand, Australia, and Argentina.

The earliest sighting of S. clava outside of its natural range was on the United States’ west coast in Californian coastal waters in the early-1900s. Since then, the invasive tunicate has spread as far south as Baja, Mexico and as far north as Vancouver Island, Canada. S. clava populations in North America’s Atlantic waters is believed to have been introduced around the 1970s.

In the mid-1900s, the next sighting of S. clava was recorded in European waters in Britain. In the span of 25 years, S. clava populations have expanded their range in the coastal waters of the United Kingdom and to mainland Europe. The current European countries with established S. clava populations are England, Ireland, Belgium, Netherlands, Denmark, France, Portugal and Spain.

=== Vectors ===
For each region there are multiple pathways by which S. clava could have been introduced. Although not definitive, S. clava's new population distribution is most likely due to anthropogenic vectors. The introduction of S. clava was most likely the result of direct introduction from Japan through shellfish transfers or ship fouling. In Europe, the source of introduction is believed to be from the hulls of military ships returning from the Korean War. As waters are becoming warmer due to climate change, there is concern of habitat expansion into previously unoccupied waters.

=== Effects ===
Successful introduction and establishment of populations outside of its natural range can cause dramatic changes in the structure and composition of benthic communities. It is dominating fouling communities, leading to population declines in other filter-feeding species, leading to lower biodiversity. S. clava is a solitary species, but with optimal conditions can reach high densities, up to 500 - 1,000 individuals, fouling man-made substrates resulting in boat and fishing gear difficulties.

They also pose a threat to aquaculture, which is being seen in European waters. In Bassin de Thau, France (Étang de Thau), S. clava is becoming a management problem as they pose a threat to oyster and mussel farming by outcompeting the shellfish for food and substrate space.
