= Homeobox =

DNA pattern affecting anatomy development

Homeodomain
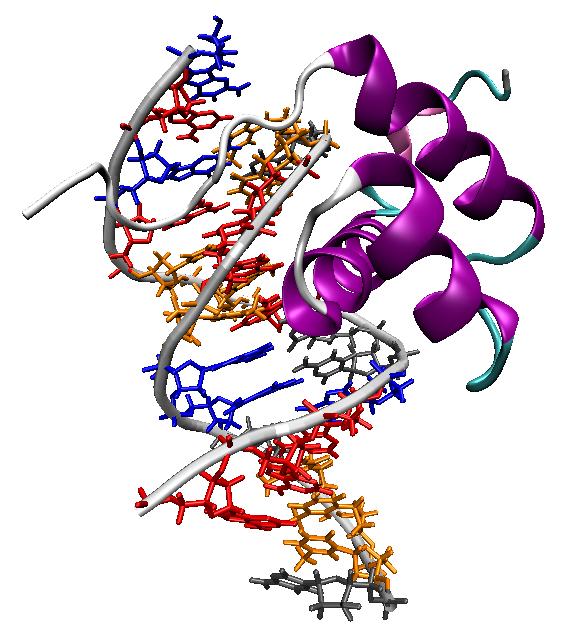
- The Antennapedia homeodomain protein from Drosophila melanogaster bound to a fragment of DNA. The recognition helix and unstructured N-terminus are bound in the major and minor grooves respectively.

Identifiers
- Symbol: Homeodomain
- Pfam: PF00046
- Pfam clan: CL0123
- InterPro: IPR001356
- SMART: SM00389
- PROSITE: PDOC00027
- SCOP2: 1ahd / SCOPe / SUPFAM
Available protein structures:
- PDB: 1ahd, 1akh, 1apl, 1au7, 1b72, 1b8i, 1bw5, 1cqt, 1du0, 1du6, 1e3o, 1enh, 1f43, 1fjl, 1ftt, 1ftz, 1gt0, 1hdd, 1hdp, 1hf0, 1hom, 1ic8, 1ig7, 1jgg, 1k61, 1kz2, 1le8, 1lfb, 1lfu, 1mh3, 1mh4, 1mnm, 1nk2, 1nk3, 1o4x, 1ocp, 1oct, 1p7i, 1p7j, 1pog, 1puf, 1qry, 1s7e, 1san, 1uhs, 1vnd, 1wi3, 1x2m, 1x2n, 1yrn, 1yz8, 1zq3, 1ztr, 2cqx, 2cra, 2cue, 2cuf, 2dmq, 2e1o, 2ecb, 2ecc, 2h8r, 2hdd, 2hi3, 2hoa, 2jwt, 2lfb, 2p81, 2r5y, 2r5z, 3hdd, 9ant IPR001356 PF00046 (ECOD; PDBsum)
- AlphaFold: IPR001356; PF00046

A homeobox is a DNA sequence, around 180 base pairs long, that regulates large-scale anatomical features in the early stages of embryonic development. Mutations in a homeobox may change large-scale anatomical features of the full-grown organism.

Homeoboxes are found within genes that are involved in the regulation of patterns of anatomical development (morphogenesis) in animals, fungi, plants, and numerous single cell eukaryotes. Homeobox genes encode homeodomain protein products that are transcription factors sharing a characteristic protein fold structure that binds DNA to regulate expression of target genes. Homeodomain proteins regulate gene expression and cell differentiation during early embryonic development, thus mutations in homeobox genes can cause developmental disorders.

Homeosis is a term coined by William Bateson to describe the outright replacement of a discrete body part with another body part, e.g. antennapedia—replacement of the antenna on the head of a fruit fly with legs. The "homeo-" prefix in the words "homeobox" and "homeodomain" stems from this mutational phenotype, which is observed when some of these genes are mutated in animals. The homeobox domain was first identified in a number of Drosophila homeotic and segmentation proteins, but is now known to be well-conserved in many other animals, including vertebrates.

== Discovery ==
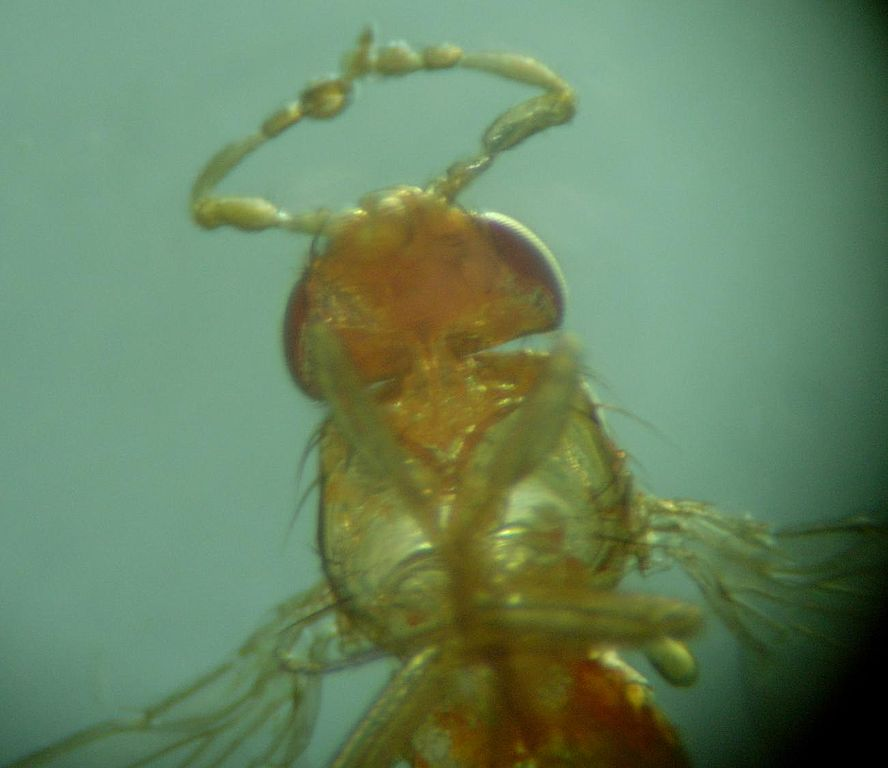
Drosophila with the antennapedia mutant phenotype exhibit homeotic transformation of the antennae into leg-like structures on the head.

The existence of homeobox genes was first discovered in Drosophila by isolating the gene responsible for a homeotic transformation where legs grow from the head instead of the expected antennae. Walter Gehring identified a gene called antennapedia that caused this homeotic phenotype. Analysis of antennapedia revealed that this gene contained a 180 base pair sequence that encoded a DNA binding domain, which William McGinnis termed the "homeobox". The existence of additional Drosophila genes containing the antennapedia homeobox sequence was independently reported by Ernst Hafen, Michael Levine, William McGinnis, and Walter Jakob Gehring of the University of Basel in Switzerland and Matthew P. Scott and Amy Weiner of Indiana University in Bloomington in 1984. Isolation of homologous genes by Edward de Robertis and William McGinnis revealed that numerous genes from a variety of species contained the homeobox. Subsequent phylogenetic studies detailing the evolutionary relationship between homeobox-containing genes showed that these genes are present in all bilaterian animals.

== Homeodomain structure ==
The characteristic homeodomain protein fold consists of a 60-amino acid long domain composed of three alpha helices. The following shows the consensus homeodomain (~60 amino acid chain):

            Helix 1          Helix 2         Helix 3/4
         ______________    __________    _________________
RRRKRTAYTRYQLLELEKEFHFNRYLTRRRRIELAHSLNLTERHIKIWFQNRRMKWKKEN
....|....|....|....|....|....|....|....|....|....|....|....|
         10        20        30        40        50        60

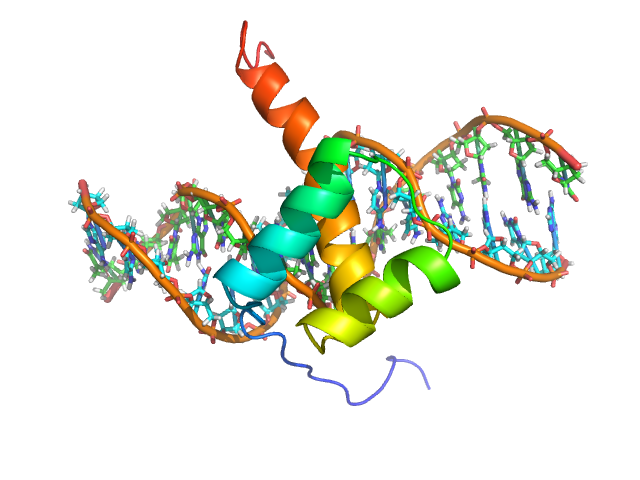
The vnd/NK-2 homeodomain-DNA complex. Helix 3 of the homeodomain binds in the major groove of the DNA and the N-terminal arm binds in the minor groove, in analogy with other homeodomain-DNA complexes.

Helix 2 and helix 3 form a so-called helix-turn-helix (HTH) structure, where the two alpha helices are connected by a short loop region. The N-terminal two helices of the homeodomain are antiparallel and the longer C-terminal helix is roughly perpendicular to the axes of the first two. It is this third helix that interacts directly with DNA via a number of hydrogen bonds and hydrophobic interactions, as well as indirect interactions via water molecules, which occur between specific side chains and the exposed bases within the major groove of the DNA.

Homeodomain proteins are found in eukaryotes. Through the HTH motif, they share limited sequence similarity and structural similarity to prokaryotic transcription factors, such as lambda phage proteins that alter the expression of genes in prokaryotes. The HTH motif shows some sequence similarity but a similar structure in a wide range of DNA-binding proteins (e.g., cro and repressor proteins, homeodomain proteins, etc.). One of the principal differences between HTH motifs in these different proteins arises from the stereochemical requirement for glycine in the turn which is needed to avoid steric interference of the beta-carbon with the main chain: for cro and repressor proteins the glycine appears to be mandatory, whereas for many of the homeotic and other DNA-binding proteins the requirement is relaxed.

=== Sequence specificity ===
Homeodomains can bind both specifically and nonspecifically to B-DNA with the C-terminal recognition helix aligning in the DNA's major groove and the unstructured peptide "tail" at the N-terminus aligning in the minor groove. The recognition helix and the inter-helix loops are rich in arginine and lysine residues, which form hydrogen bonds to the DNA backbone. Conserved hydrophobic residues in the center of the recognition helix aid in stabilizing the helix packing. Homeodomain proteins show a preference for the DNA sequence 5'-TAAT-3'; sequence-independent binding occurs with significantly lower affinity. The specificity of a single homeodomain protein is usually not enough to recognize specific target gene promoters, making cofactor binding an important mechanism for controlling binding sequence specificity and target gene expression. To achieve higher target specificity, homeodomain proteins form complexes with other transcription factors to recognize the promoter region of a specific target gene.

== Biological function ==
Homeodomain proteins function as transcription factors due to the DNA binding properties of the conserved HTH motif. Homeodomain proteins are considered to be master control genes, meaning that a single protein can regulate expression of many target genes. Homeodomain proteins direct the formation of the body axes and body structures during early embryonic development. Many homeodomain proteins induce cellular differentiation by initiating the cascades of coregulated genes required to produce individual tissues and organs. Other proteins in the family, such as NANOG are involved in maintaining pluripotency and preventing cell differentiation.

== Regulation ==
Hox genes and their associated microRNAs are highly conserved developmental master regulators with tight tissue-specific, spatiotemporal control. These genes are known to be dysregulated in several cancers and are often controlled by DNA methylation. The regulation of Hox genes is highly complex and involves reciprocal interactions, mostly inhibitory. Drosophila is known to use the polycomb and trithorax complexes to maintain the expression of Hox genes after the down-regulation of the pair-rule and gap genes that occurs during larval development. Polycomb-group proteins can silence the Hox genes by modulation of chromatin structure.

== Mutations ==
Mutations to homeobox genes can produce easily visible phenotypic changes in body segment identity, such as the Antennapedia and Bithorax mutant phenotypes in Drosophila. Duplication of homeobox genes can produce new body segments, and such duplications are likely to have been important in the evolution of segmented animals.

== Evolution ==
Phylogenetic analysis of homeobox gene sequences and homeodomain protein structures suggests that the last common ancestor of plants, fungi, and animals had at least two homeobox genes. Molecular evidence shows that some limited number of Hox genes have existed in the Cnidaria since before the earliest true Bilatera, making these genes pre-Paleozoic. It is accepted that the three major animal ANTP-class clusters, Hox, ParaHox, and NK (MetaHox), are the result of segmental duplications. A first duplication created MetaHox and ProtoHox, the latter of which later duplicated into Hox and ParaHox. The clusters themselves were created by tandem duplications of a single ANTP-class homeobox gene. Gene duplication followed by neofunctionalization is responsible for the many homeobox genes found in eukaryotes. Comparison of homeobox genes and gene clusters has been used to understand the evolution of genome structure and body morphology throughout metazoans.

== Types of homeobox genes ==
=== Hox genes ===
Hox gene expression in Drosophila melanogaster.

Hox genes are the most commonly known subset of homeobox genes. They are essential metazoan genes that determine the identity of embryonic regions along the anterior-posterior axis. The first vertebrate Hox gene was isolated in Xenopus by Edward De Robertis and colleagues in 1984. The main interest in this set of genes stems from their unique behavior and arrangement in the genome. Hox genes are typically found in an organized cluster. The linear order of Hox genes within a cluster is directly correlated to the order in which they are expressed in both time and space during development. This phenomenon is called colinearity.

Mutations in these homeotic genes cause displacement of body segments during embryonic development. This is called ectopia. For example, when one gene is lost the segment develops into a more anterior one, while a mutation that leads to a gain of function causes a segment to develop into a more posterior one. Famous examples are Antennapedia and bithorax in Drosophila, which can cause the development of legs instead of antennae and the development of a duplicated thorax, respectively.

In vertebrates, the four paralog clusters are partially redundant in function, but have also acquired several derived functions. For example, HoxA and HoxD specify segment identity along the limb axis. Specific members of the Hox family have been implicated in vascular remodeling, angiogenesis, and disease by orchestrating changes in matrix degradation, integrins, and components of the ECM. HoxA5 is implicated in atherosclerosis. HoxD3 and HoxB3 are proinvasive, angiogenic genes that upregulate b3 and a5 integrins and Efna1 in ECs, respectively. HoxA3 induces endothelial cell (EC) migration by upregulating MMP14 and uPAR. Conversely, HoxD10 and HoxA5 have the opposite effect of suppressing EC migration and angiogenesis, and stabilizing adherens junctions by upregulating TIMP1/downregulating uPAR and MMP14, and by upregulating Tsp2/downregulating VEGFR2, Efna1, Hif1alpha and COX-2, respectively. HoxA5 also upregulates the tumor suppressor p53 and Akt1 by downregulation of PTEN. Suppression of HoxA5 has been shown to attenuate hemangioma growth. HoxA5 has far-reaching effects on gene expression, causing ~300 genes to become upregulated upon its induction in breast cancer cell lines. HoxA5 protein transduction domain overexpression prevents inflammation shown by inhibition of TNFalpha-inducible monocyte binding to HUVECs.

=== LIM genes ===
LIM genes (named after the initial letters of the names of three proteins where the characteristic domain was first identified) encode two 60 amino acid cysteine and histidine-rich LIM domains and a homeodomain. The LIM domains function in protein-protein interactions and can bind zinc molecules. LIM domain proteins are found in both the cytosol and the nucleus. They function in cytoskeletal remodeling, at focal adhesion sites, as scaffolds for protein complexes, and as transcription factors.

=== Pax genes ===
Domain structure of the human Paired box protein Pax7 (Uniprot P23759-1). Of the 9 Pax protein encoded by the human genome, four also contain a Hox domain.

Most Pax genes contain a homeobox and a paired domain that also binds DNA to increase binding specificity, though some Pax genes have lost all or part of the homeobox sequence. Pax genes function in embryo segmentation, nervous system development, generation of the frontal eye fields, skeletal development, and formation of face structures. Pax 6 is a master regulator of eye development, such that the gene is necessary for development of the optic vesicle and subsequent eye structures.

=== POU genes ===
Proteins containing a POU region consist of a homeodomain and a separate, structurally homologous POU domain that contains two helix-turn-helix motifs and also binds DNA. The two domains are linked by a flexible loop that is long enough to stretch around the DNA helix, allowing the two domains to bind on opposite sides of the target DNA, collectively covering an eight-base segment with consensus sequence 5'-ATGCAAAT-3'. The individual domains of POU proteins bind DNA only weakly, but have strong sequence-specific affinity when linked. The POU domain itself has significant structural similarity with repressors expressed in bacteriophages, particularly lambda phage.

== Plant homeobox genes ==
As in animals, the plant homeobox genes code for the typical 60 amino acid long DNA-binding homeodomain or in case of the TALE (three amino acid loop extension) homeobox genes for an atypical homeodomain consisting of 63 amino acids. According to their conserved intron–exon structure and to unique codomain architectures they have been grouped into 14 distinct classes: HD-ZIP I to IV, BEL, KNOX, PLINC, WOX, PHD, DDT, NDX, LD, SAWADEE and PINTOX. Conservation of codomains suggests a common eukaryotic ancestry for TALE and non-TALE homeodomain proteins.

== Human homeobox genes ==
The Hox genes in humans are organized in four chromosomal clusters:

name	chromosome	gene
HOXA (or sometimes HOX1) - HOXA@	chromosome 7	HOXA1, HOXA2, HOXA3, HOXA4, HOXA5, HOXA6, HOXA7, HOXA9, HOXA10, HOXA11, HOXA13
HOXB - HOXB@	chromosome 17	HOXB1, HOXB2, HOXB3, HOXB4, HOXB5, HOXB6, HOXB7, HOXB8, HOXB9, HOXB13
HOXC - HOXC@	chromosome 12	HOXC4, HOXC5, HOXC6, HOXC8, HOXC9, HOXC10, HOXC11, HOXC12, HOXC13
HOXD - HOXD@	chromosome 2	HOXD1, HOXD3, HOXD4, HOXD8, HOXD9, HOXD10, HOXD11, HOXD12, HOXD13

ParaHox genes are analogously found in four areas. They include CDX1, CDX2, CDX4; GSX1, GSX2; and PDX1. Other genes considered Hox-like include EVX1, EVX2; GBX1, GBX2; MEOX1, MEOX2; and MNX1. The NK-like (NKL) genes, some of which are considered "MetaHox", are grouped with Hox-like genes into a large ANTP-like group.

Humans have a "distal-less homeobox" family: DLX1, DLX2, DLX3, DLX4, DLX5, and DLX6. Dlx genes are involved in the development of the nervous system and of limbs. They are considered a subset of the NK-like genes.

Human TALE (Three Amino acid Loop Extension) homeobox genes for an "atypical" homeodomain consist of 63 rather than 60 amino acids: IRX1, IRX2, IRX3, IRX4, IRX5, IRX6; MEIS1, MEIS2, MEIS3; MKX; PBX1, PBX2, PBX3, PBX4; PKNOX1, PKNOX2; TGIF1, TGIF2, TGIF2LX, TGIF2LY.

In addition, humans have the following homeobox genes and proteins:

- LIM-class: ISL1, ISL2; LHX1, LHX2, LHX3, LHX4, LHX5, LHX6, LHX8, LHX9; (Note: Grouped as Lmx 1/5, 2/9, 3/4, and 6/8.) LMX1A, LMX1B
- POU-class: HDX; POU1F1; POU2F1; POU2F2; POU2F3; POU3F1; POU3F2; POU3F3; POU3F4; POU4F1; POU4F2; POU4F3; POU5F1; POU5F1P1; POU5F1P4; POU5F2; POU6F1; and POU6F2
- CERS-class: LASS2, LASS3, LASS4, LASS5, LASS6;
- HNF-class: HMBOX1; HNF1A, HNF1B;
- SINE-class: SIX1, SIX2, SIX3, SIX4, SIX5, SIX6 (Note: Grouped as Six 1/2, 3/6, and 4/5.)
- CUT-class: ONECUT1, ONECUT2, ONECUT3; CUX1, CUX2; SATB1, SATB2;
- ZF-class: ADNP, ADNP2; TSHZ1, TSHZ2, TSHZ3; ZEB1, ZEB2; ZFHX2, ZFHX3, ZFHX4; ZHX1, HOMEZ;
- PRD-class: ALX1 (CART1), ALX3, ALX4; ARGFX; ARX; DMBX1; DPRX; DRGX; DUXA, DUXB, DUX (1, 2, 3, 4, 4c, 5); (Note: Questionable, per) ESX1; GSC, GSC2; HESX1; HOPX; ISX; LEUTX; MIXL1; NOBOX; OTP; OTX1, OTX2, CRX; PAX2, PAX3, PAX4, PAX5, PAX6, PAX7, PAX8; (Note: The Pax genes. Grouped as Pax2/5/8, Pax3/7, and Pax4/6.) PHOX2A, PHOX2B; PITX1, PITX2, PITX3; PROP1; PRRX1, PRRX2; RAX, RAX2; RHOXF1, RHOXF2/2B; SEBOX; SHOX, SHOX2; TPRX1; UNCX; VSX1, VSX2
- NKL-class: BARHL1, BARHL2; BARX1, BARX2; BSX; DBX1, DBX2; EMX1, EMX2; EN1, EN2; HHEX; HLX1; LBX1, LBX2; MSX1, MSX2; NANOG; NOTO; TLX1, TLX2, TLX3; TSHZ1, TSHZ2, TSHZ3; VAX1, VAX2, VENTX;
  - Nkx: NKX2-1, NKX2-4; NKX2-2, NKX2-8; NKX3-1, NKX3-2; NKX2-3, NKX2-5, NKX2-6; (Note: Nk4.) HMX1, HMX2, HMX3; (Note: Nk5.) NKX6-1; NKX6-2; NKX6-3;

== See also ==
- Body plan
- Evolutionary developmental biology
