= DBX2 =

Protein-coding gene in humans

Identifiers
- Aliases: DBX2, developing brain homeobox 2
- External IDs: MGI: 107445; GeneCards: DBX2

Gene location (Human)
Chr.	Chromosome 12 (human)
Band	12q12	Start	45,014,672 bp
Band	12q12	End	45,051,099 bp

Gene location (Mouse)
Chr.	Chromosome 15 (mouse)
Band	15 E3|15 50.47 cM	Start	95,521,444 bp
Band	15 E3|15 50.47 cM	End	95,553,841 bp
RNA expression pattern
Bgee	Human / Mouse (ortholog); Top expressed in: testicle; gonad; substantia nigra; hypothalamus; C1 segment; amygdala; anterior cingulate cortex; prefrontal cortex; putamen; hippocampus proper / Top expressed in: dentate gyrus of hippocampal formation granule cell; lumbar subsegment of spinal cord; phalanx of foot; hallux; visual cortex; embryo; phalanx of big toe; primary visual cortex; phalanx of second toe; embryo; More reference expression data
BioGPS	n/a
Gene ontology
Molecular function	sequence-specific DNA binding; DNA binding; DNA-binding transcription factor activity, RNA polymerase II-specific
Cellular component	nucleus
Biological process	regulation of transcription, DNA-templated; regulation of transcription by RNA polymerase II
Sources:Amigo / QuickGO
Orthologs
Databases	NCBI: entry; OMA: entry
Species	Human	Mouse
Entrez	440097	223843
Ensembl	ENSG00000185610	ENSMUSG00000045608
UniProt	Q6ZNG2	n/a
RefSeq (mRNA)	NM_001004329	NM_207533
RefSeq (protein)	NP_001004329	n/a
Location (UCSC)	Chr 12: 45.01 – 45.05 Mb	Chr 15: 95.52 – 95.55 Mb
PubMed search
- Wikidata
View/Edit Human	View/Edit Mouse

Homeobox protein DBX2, also known as developing brain homeobox protein 2, is a protein that in humans is encoded by the DBX2 gene. DBX2, a homeodomain-containing protein, plays an important role in the development of the central nervous system, specifically in the development of the neural tube and brain. The gene DBX2 is located on chromosome 12 and is approximately 36,000 base pairs long. DBX2 is predicted to enable DNA-binding transcription activity as well as being involved in the regulation of transcription by RNA polymerase II.

== Identification ==
Dbx (developing brain homeobox) was first isolated from a gestational day 13.5 mouse in 1992. There are two Dbx genes (DBX1 and DBX2) which are both important for development of the central nervous system. DBX2 shows conserved expression patterns in the developing brain and spinal cord and plays an important role in neural patterning and differentiation.

== Associated diseases ==
DBX2 has been found to play an important role in the development of glioblastoma which is a lethal brain cancer with poor prognosis. A high expression of DBX2 has been linked to large tumor size in hepatocellular carcinoma while downregulated expression of DBX2 has been associated with endometrial cancer.
