= HOTAIRM1 =

Non-coding RNA in the species Homo sapiens

Identifiers
- Aliases: HOTAIRM1, HOXA-AS1, HOXA1-AS1, NCRNA00179, HOXA transcript antisense RNA, myeloid-specific 1
- External IDs: GeneCards: HOTAIRM1

Gene location (Human)
Chr.	Chromosome 7 (human)
Band	7p15.2	Start	27,095,647 bp
Band	7p15.2	End	27,100,265 bp
RNA expression pattern
Bgee	Human / Mouse (ortholog); Top expressed in: right uterine tube; gastric mucosa; spleen; Descending thoracic aorta; mucosa of transverse colon; monocyte; ascending aorta; right lung; C1 segment; lactiferous gland / n/a; More reference expression data
BioGPS	n/a
Orthologs
Databases	NCBI: entry; OMA: entry
Species	Human	Mouse
Entrez	100506311	n/a
Ensembl	ENSG00000233429	n/a
UniProt	n a	n/a
RefSeq (mRNA)	n/a	n/a
RefSeq (protein)	n/a	n/a
Location (UCSC)	Chr 7: 27.1 – 27.1 Mb	n/a
PubMed search		n/a
- Wikidata
View/Edit Human

HOTAIRM1 (HOX antisense intergenic RNA myeloid 1) is a long non-coding RNA gene. In humans, it is located between the HOXA1 and HOXA2 genes. HOTAIRM1 is expressed in cells of a myeloid lineage, and may play a role in myeloid transcriptional regulation.

== See also ==
- Long noncoding RNA
