= ZFHX3 =

Protein-coding gene in humans

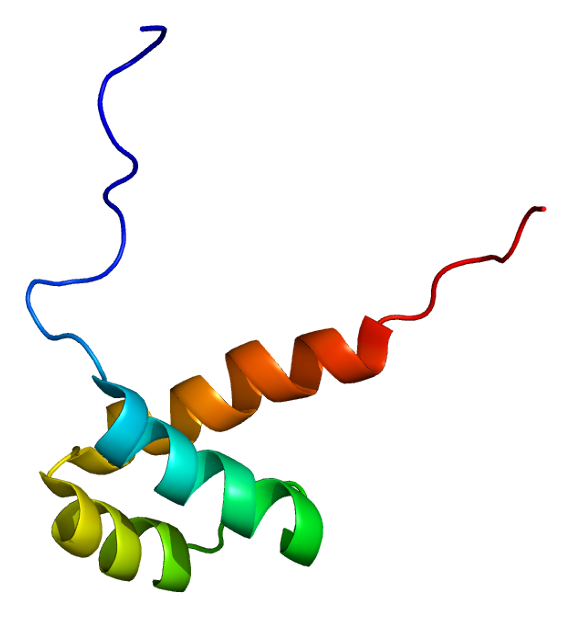

Identifiers
- Aliases: ZFHX3, ATBF1, ATBT, ZNF927, zinc finger homeobox 3
- External IDs: OMIM: 104155; MGI: 99948; GeneCards: ZFHX3
Available structures
PDB	Ortholog search: PDBe RCSB
PDB	List of PDB id codes 2DA1, 2DA2, 2DA3

Gene location (Human)
Chr.	Chromosome 16 (human)
Band	16q22.2-q22.3	Start	72,782,885 bp
Band	16q22.2-q22.3	End	73,891,871 bp

Gene location (Mouse)
Chr.	Chromosome 8 (mouse)
Band	8|8 D3	Start	108,669,276 bp
Band	8|8 D3	End	109,688,262 bp
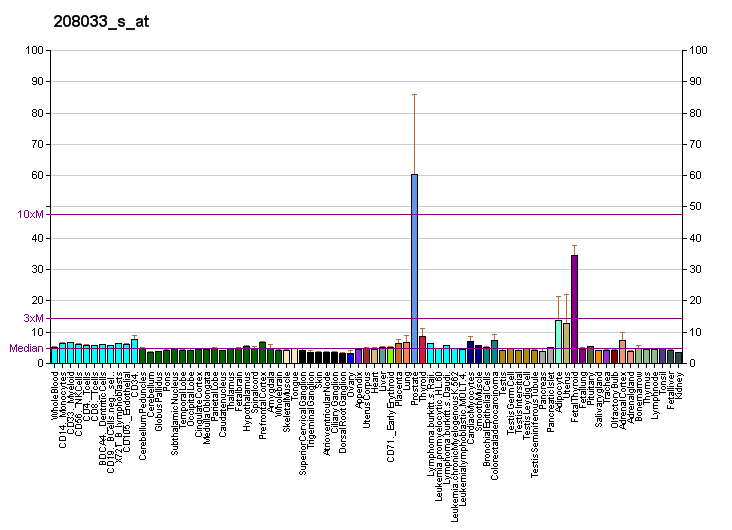
RNA expression pattern
Bgee	Human / Mouse (ortholog); Top expressed in: saphenous vein; buccal mucosa cell; synovial joint; tendon of biceps brachii; lateral nuclear group of thalamus; pericardium; urethra; mucosa of paranasal sinus; trigeminal ganglion; spinal ganglia / Top expressed in: ascending aorta; aortic valve; external carotid artery; lacrimal gland; internal carotid artery; tunica media of zone of aorta; vestibular membrane of cochlear duct; ciliary body; superior cervical ganglion; lumbar spinal ganglion; More reference expression data
BioGPS	More reference expression data
Gene ontology
Molecular function	DNA binding; sequence-specific DNA binding; DNA-binding transcription factor activity; zinc ion binding; metal ion binding; core promoter sequence-specific DNA binding; protein binding; nucleic acid binding; enzyme binding; transcription factor activity, RNA polymerase II distal enhancer sequence-specific binding; RNA polymerase II cis-regulatory region sequence-specific DNA binding; DNA-binding transcription repressor activity, RNA polymerase II-specific; DNA-binding transcription factor activity, RNA polymerase II-specific
Cellular component	cytoplasm; nuclear body; transcription regulator complex; nucleus; nucleoplasm
Biological process	negative regulation of myoblast differentiation; regulation of transcription, DNA-templated; regulation of locomotor rhythm; muscle organ development; transcription by RNA polymerase II; circadian regulation of gene expression; transcription, DNA-templated; positive regulation of transcription, DNA-templated; positive regulation of myoblast differentiation; negative regulation of transcription, DNA-templated; response to transforming growth factor beta; negative regulation of transcription by RNA polymerase II; brain development; regulation of neuron differentiation; positive regulation of cell adhesion; positive regulation of transcription by RNA polymerase II
Sources:Amigo / QuickGO
Orthologs
Databases	NCBI: entry; OMA: entry
Species	Human	Mouse
Entrez	463	11906
Ensembl	ENSG00000140836	ENSMUSG00000038872
UniProt	Q15911	Q61329
RefSeq (mRNA)	NM_001164766; NM_006885	NM_007496
RefSeq (protein)	NP_001158238; NP_008816	n/a
Location (UCSC)	Chr 16: 72.78 – 73.89 Mb	Chr 8: 108.67 – 109.69 Mb
PubMed search
- Wikidata
View/Edit Human	View/Edit Mouse

Zinc finger homeobox protein 3 is a protein that in humans is encoded by the ZFHX3 gene.

== Function ==
This protein is a transcription factor with multiple homeodomains and zinc finger motifs, and regulates myogenic and neuronal differentiation. It suppresses expression of the alpha-fetoprotein gene by binding to an AT-rich enhancer motif. The protein has also been shown to negatively regulate c-Myb, and transactivate the cell cycle inhibitor cyclin-dependent kinase inhibitor 1A. The gene ZFHX3 is reported to function as a tumor suppressor in several cancers, and sequence variants of this gene are also associated with atrial fibrillation.
