= PRRX2 =

Protein-coding gene in the species Homo sapiens

Identifiers
- Aliases: PRRX2, PMX2, PRX2, paired related homeobox 2
- External IDs: OMIM: 604675; MGI: 98218; GeneCards: PRRX2

Gene location (Human)
Chr.	Chromosome 9 (human)
Band	9q34.11	Start	129,665,647 bp
Band	9q34.11	End	129,722,674 bp

Gene location (Mouse)
Chr.	Chromosome 2 (mouse)
Band	2 B|2 21.74 cM	Start	30,724,984 bp
Band	2 B|2 21.74 cM	End	30,771,263 bp
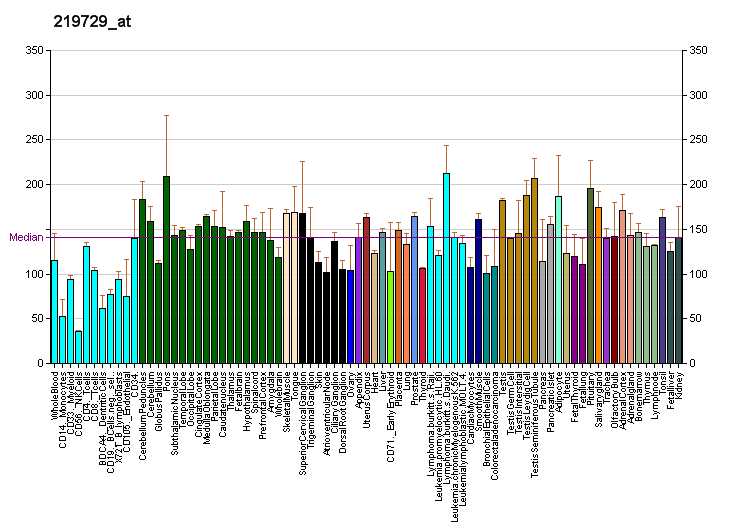
RNA expression pattern
Bgee	Human / Mouse (ortholog); Top expressed in: ascending aorta; periodontal fiber; Descending thoracic aorta; gingival epithelium; tibial arteries; vena cava; gonad; skin of leg; canal of the cervix; cartilage tissue / Top expressed in: hand; calvaria; maxillary prominence; mandibular prominence; external carotid artery; nasal septum; upper jaw; dermis; foot; abdominal wall; More reference expression data
BioGPS	More reference expression data
Gene ontology
Molecular function	DNA-binding transcription factor activity; sequence-specific DNA binding; DNA binding; DNA-binding transcription factor activity, RNA polymerase II-specific
Cellular component	nucleus
Biological process	multicellular organism development; regulation of transcription, DNA-templated; regulation of transcription by RNA polymerase II
Sources:Amigo / QuickGO
Orthologs
Databases	NCBI: entry; OMA: entry
Species	Human	Mouse
Entrez	51450	20204
Ensembl	ENSG00000167157	ENSMUSG00000039476
UniProt	Q99811	Q06348
RefSeq (mRNA)	NM_016307	NM_009116
RefSeq (protein)	NP_057391	NP_033142
Location (UCSC)	Chr 9: 129.67 – 129.72 Mb	Chr 2: 30.72 – 30.77 Mb
PubMed search
- Wikidata
View/Edit Human	View/Edit Mouse

Paired mesoderm homeobox protein 2 is a protein that in humans is encoded by the PRRX2 gene.

== Function ==
The DNA-associated protein encoded by this gene is a member of the paired family of homeobox proteins. Expression is localized to proliferating fetal fibroblasts and the developing dermal layer, with downregulated expression in adult skin. Increases in expression of this gene during fetal but not adult wound healing suggest a possible role in mechanisms that control mammalian dermal regeneration and prevent formation of scar response to wounding. The expression patterns provide evidence consistent with a role in fetal skin development and a possible role in cellular proliferation.
