= HOXD4 =

Protein-coding gene

Identifiers
- Aliases: HOXD4, HHO.C13, HOX-5.1, HOX4, HOX4B, Hox-4.2, homeobox D4
- External IDs: OMIM: 142981; MGI: 96208; GeneCards: HOXD4

Gene location (Human)
Chr.	Chromosome 2 (human)
Band	2q31.1	Start	176,151,550 bp
Band	2q31.1	End	176,153,226 bp

Gene location (Mouse)
Chr.	Chromosome 2 (mouse)
Band	2 C3|2 44.13 cM	Start	74,542,273 bp
Band	2 C3|2 44.13 cM	End	74,559,504 bp
RNA expression pattern
Bgee	Human / Mouse (ortholog); Top expressed in: body of uterus; right uterine tube; corpus epididymis; testicle; right ovary; left ovary; left uterine tube; tail of epididymis; human kidney; left adrenal cortex / Top expressed in: cervical vertebral column; thoracic vertebral column; tail of embryo; lumbar subsegment of spinal cord; enteric nervous system; lactiferous gland; genital tubercle; embryo; transitional epithelium of urinary bladder; uterus; More reference expression data
BioGPS	n/a
Gene ontology
Molecular function	DNA-binding transcription factor activity; sequence-specific DNA binding; DNA binding; RNA polymerase II transcription regulatory region sequence-specific DNA binding; DNA-binding transcription activator activity, RNA polymerase II-specific; DNA-binding transcription factor activity, RNA polymerase II-specific
Cellular component	nucleus; nucleoplasm; cell junction
Biological process	transcription, DNA-templated; regulation of transcription, DNA-templated; multicellular organism development; transcription by RNA polymerase II; positive regulation of transcription by RNA polymerase II; skeletal system development; anterior/posterior pattern specification; embryonic skeletal system morphogenesis
Sources:Amigo / QuickGO
Orthologs
Databases	NCBI: entry; OMA: entry
Species	Human	Mouse
Entrez	3233	15436
Ensembl	ENSG00000170166	ENSMUSG00000101174
UniProt	P09016	P10628
RefSeq (mRNA)	NM_014621	NM_010469
RefSeq (protein)	NP_055436	NP_034599
Location (UCSC)	Chr 2: 176.15 – 176.15 Mb	Chr 2: 74.54 – 74.56 Mb
PubMed search
- Wikidata
View/Edit Human	View/Edit Mouse

Homeobox protein Hox-D4 is a protein that in humans is encoded by the HOXD4 gene.

== Function ==
This gene belongs to the homeobox family of genes. The homeobox genes encode a highly conserved family of transcription factors that play an important role in morphogenesis in all multicellular organisms. Mammals possess four similar homeobox gene clusters, HOXA, HOXB, HOXC and HOXD, located on different chromosomes, consisting of 9 to 11 genes arranged in tandem. This gene is one of several homeobox HOXD genes located at 2q31-2q37 chromosome regions. Deletions that removed the entire HOXD gene cluster or 5' end of this cluster have been associated with severe limb and genital abnormalities. The protein encoded by this gene may play a role in determining positional values in developing limb buds. Alternatively spliced variants have been described but their full length nature has not been determined.

== See also ==
- Homeobox
