= RHOXF2 =

Mammalian protein found in Homo sapiens

Identifiers
- Aliases: RHOXF2, CT107, PEPP-2, PEPP2, THG1, Rhox homeobox family member 2
- External IDs: OMIM: 300447; GeneCards: RHOXF2

Gene location (Human)
Chr.	X chromosome (human)
Band	Xq24	Start	120,158,613 bp
Band	Xq24	End	120,165,630 bp
RNA expression pattern
Bgee	Human / Mouse (ortholog); Top expressed in: testicle; gonad; right testis; left testis; right uterine tube; blood; primary visual cortex; human kidney; human musculoskeletal system; intestine / n/a; More reference expression data
BioGPS	n/a
Gene ontology
Molecular function	protein binding; sequence-specific DNA binding; DNA binding; DNA-binding transcription factor activity, RNA polymerase II-specific; identical protein binding
Cellular component	nucleus
Biological process	regulation of transcription, DNA-templated; positive regulation of gene expression; regulation of transcription by RNA polymerase II
Sources:Amigo / QuickGO
Orthologs
Databases	NCBI: entry; OMA: entry
Species	Human	Mouse
Entrez	84528	n/a
Ensembl	ENSG00000131721	n/a
UniProt	Q9BQY4	n/a
RefSeq (mRNA)	NM_032498	n/a
RefSeq (protein)	NP_115887	n/a
Location (UCSC)	Chr X: 120.16 – 120.17 Mb	n/a
PubMed search		n/a
- Wikidata
View/Edit Human

Rhox homeobox family, member 2 also known as paired-like homeobox protein (PEPP-2) is a protein in humans that is encoded by the RHOXF2 gene.

RHOXF2 contains a glutamine-rich N-terminus, a homeodomain, and a proline-rich C-terminus.
