= HOXD3 =

Protein-coding gene in the species Homo sapiens

Identifiers
- Aliases: HOXD3, HOX1D, HOX4, HOX4A, Hox-4.1, homeobox D3
- External IDs: OMIM: 142980; MGI: 96207; GeneCards: HOXD3

Gene location (Human)
Chr.	Chromosome 2 (human)
Band	2q31.1	Start	176,136,612 bp
Band	2q31.1	End	176,173,102 bp

Gene location (Mouse)
Chr.	Chromosome 2 (mouse)
Band	2 C3|2 44.13 cM	Start	74,542,271 bp
Band	2 C3|2 44.13 cM	End	74,578,786 bp
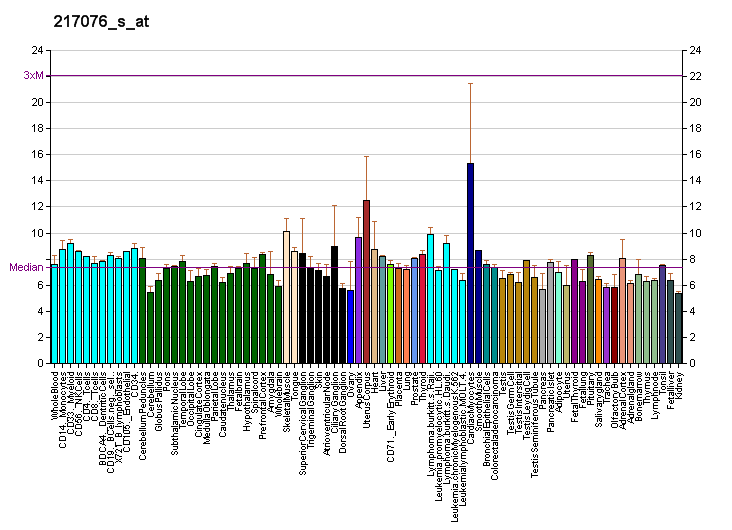

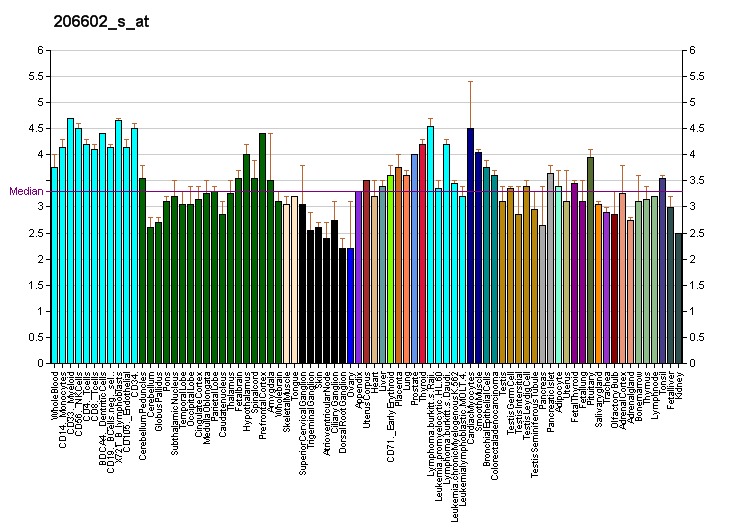

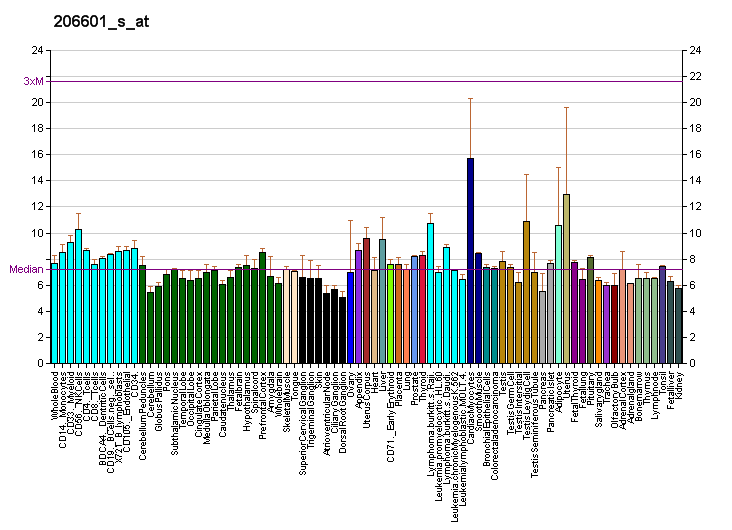
RNA expression pattern
Bgee	Human / Mouse (ortholog); Top expressed in: corpus epididymis; germinal epithelium; right uterine tube; body of uterus; seminal vesicula; tail of epididymis; gonad; caput epididymis; right ovary; sperm / Top expressed in: ureteric bud; tail of embryo; medulla oblongata; enteric nervous system; wall of urinary bladder; urethra; male urethra; ureter; renal pelvis; mucosa of urinary bladder; More reference expression data
BioGPS	More reference expression data
Gene ontology
Molecular function	DNA-binding transcription factor activity; sequence-specific DNA binding; DNA binding; protein binding; RNA polymerase II transcription regulatory region sequence-specific DNA binding; DNA-binding transcription activator activity, RNA polymerase II-specific; DNA-binding transcription factor activity, RNA polymerase II-specific; RNA polymerase II cis-regulatory region sequence-specific DNA binding
Cellular component	aggresome; nucleoplasm; nucleus; nuclear body
Biological process	Notch signaling pathway; glossopharyngeal nerve morphogenesis; embryonic skeletal system morphogenesis; multicellular organism development; thyroid gland development; cartilage development; positive regulation of gene expression; cell-matrix adhesion; regulation of transcription, DNA-templated; positive regulation of neuron differentiation; transcription, DNA-templated; anterior/posterior pattern specification; transcription by RNA polymerase II; positive regulation of transcription by RNA polymerase II
Sources:Amigo / QuickGO
Orthologs
Databases	NCBI: entry; OMA: entry
Species	Human	Mouse
Entrez	3232	15434
Ensembl	ENSG00000128652	ENSMUSG00000079277
UniProt	P31249	P09027
RefSeq (mRNA)	NM_006898	NM_010468
RefSeq (protein)	NP_008829	NP_034598
Location (UCSC)	Chr 2: 176.14 – 176.17 Mb	Chr 2: 74.54 – 74.58 Mb
PubMed search
- Wikidata
View/Edit Human	View/Edit Mouse

Homeobox protein Hox-D3 is a protein that in humans is encoded by the HOXD3 gene.

== Function ==
This gene belongs to the homeobox family of genes. The homeobox genes encode a highly conserved family of transcription factors that play an important role in morphogenesis in all multicellular organisms. Mammals possess four similar homeobox gene clusters, HOXA, HOXB, HOXC and HOXD, located on different chromosomes, consisting of 9 to 11 genes arranged in tandem. This gene is one of several homeobox HOXD genes located at 2q31-2q37 chromosome regions. Deletions that removed the entire HOXD gene cluster or 5' end of this cluster have been associated with severe limb and genital abnormalities. The protein encoded by this gene may play a role in the regulation of cell adhesion processes.

== See also ==
- Homeobox
