= HOXA6 =

Protein-coding gene in the species Homo sapiens

Identifiers
- Aliases: HOXA6, HOX1, HOX1.2, HOX1B, homeobox A6
- External IDs: OMIM: 142951; MGI: 96178; GeneCards: HOXA6

Gene location (Human)
Chr.	Chromosome 7 (human)
Band	7p15.2	Start	27,145,396 bp
Band	7p15.2	End	27,150,603 bp

Gene location (Mouse)
Chr.	Chromosome 6 (mouse)
Band	6 B3|6 25.4 cM	Start	52,183,268 bp
Band	6 B3|6 25.4 cM	End	52,185,702 bp
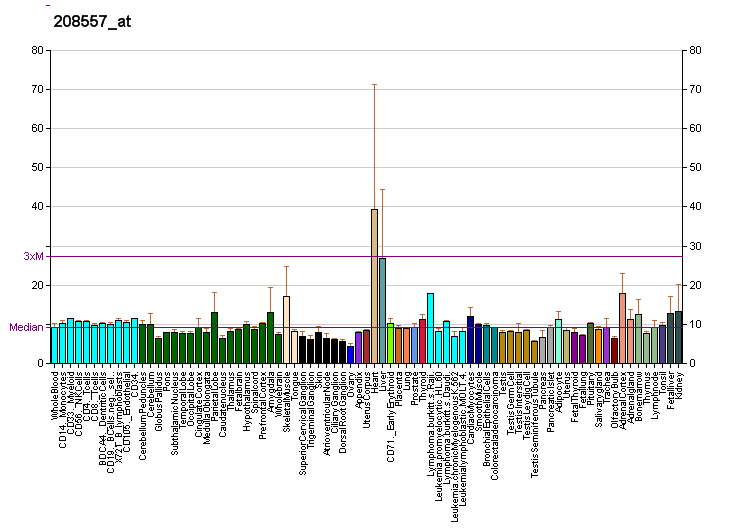
RNA expression pattern
Bgee	Human / Mouse (ortholog); Top expressed in: left uterine tube; stromal cell of endometrium; transverse colon; body of uterus; tendon of biceps brachii; left adrenal cortex; right adrenal gland; right adrenal cortex; muscle of thigh; muscle layer of sigmoid colon / Top expressed in: tail of embryo; genital tubercle; stroma of kidney; Gray matter of spinal cord; neural tube; ureter; embryo; sensory ganglion; posterior horn of spinal cord; medulla oblongata; More reference expression data
BioGPS	More reference expression data
Gene ontology
Molecular function	DNA-binding transcription factor activity; sequence-specific DNA binding; DNA binding; DNA-binding transcription factor activity, RNA polymerase II-specific; RNA polymerase II cis-regulatory region sequence-specific DNA binding; DNA-binding transcription activator activity, RNA polymerase II-specific; transcription factor activity, RNA polymerase II distal enhancer sequence-specific binding
Cellular component	nucleus
Biological process	embryonic skeletal system morphogenesis; multicellular organism development; regulation of transcription, DNA-templated; transcription, DNA-templated; anterior/posterior pattern specification; embryonic skeletal system development; regulation of transcription by RNA polymerase II; positive regulation of transcription by RNA polymerase II
Sources:Amigo / QuickGO
Orthologs
Databases	NCBI: entry; OMA: entry
Species	Human	Mouse
Entrez	3203	15403
Ensembl	ENSG00000106006	ENSMUSG00000043219
UniProt	P31267	P09092
RefSeq (mRNA)	NM_024014	NM_010454
RefSeq (protein)	NP_076919	NP_034584
Location (UCSC)	Chr 7: 27.15 – 27.15 Mb	Chr 6: 52.18 – 52.19 Mb
PubMed search
- Wikidata
View/Edit Human	View/Edit Mouse

Homeobox protein Hox-A6 is a protein that in humans is encoded by the HOXA6 gene.

== Function ==
In vertebrates, the genes encoding the class of transcription factors called homeobox genes are found in clusters named A, B, C, and D on four separate chromosomes. Expression of these proteins is spatially and temporally regulated during embryonic development. This gene is part of the A cluster on chromosome 7 and encodes a DNA-binding transcription factor which may regulate gene expression, morphogenesis, and differentiation.

== Clinical significance ==
=== Leukemia ===
HOXA6 was examined to be preferentially expressed in primitive cells (e.g. hematopoietic progenitor cells), under the regulation of growth factors and cell cycles. Interleukin 3 and all-trans retinoic acid were found to be the inducing factors that can stimulate the expression of HOXA6. In mitotic process, HOXA6 was mainly expressed in S-phase and G2M phase cells. Overexpression of HoxA6 increased proliferation but inhibited differentiation of multipotential stem cells in the process of hemopoiesis, even had the capacity to transform primary hematopoietic cells into immortal cell lines. Transplantation of these cell lines may cause acute myeloid leukemia in recipient animals. Also in patients with acute myeloid leukemia, HOXA6 expression was upregulated. The co-methylation of HOX genes, including HOXA6, leads to the dysfunction of tumor suppression genes by reducing gene expression. The methylation processes can be identified in adult chronic lymphocytic leukemia and childhood acute lymphocytic leukemia.

=== Glioblastoma ===
HOXA6 may also contribute to the invasive tendency of glioblastoma multiforme cells. Suppressed expression of HOXA6 by introducing its antisense fragments can reduce the invasion of glioblastoma multiforme cells.
