= HOPX =

Protein-coding gene in humans

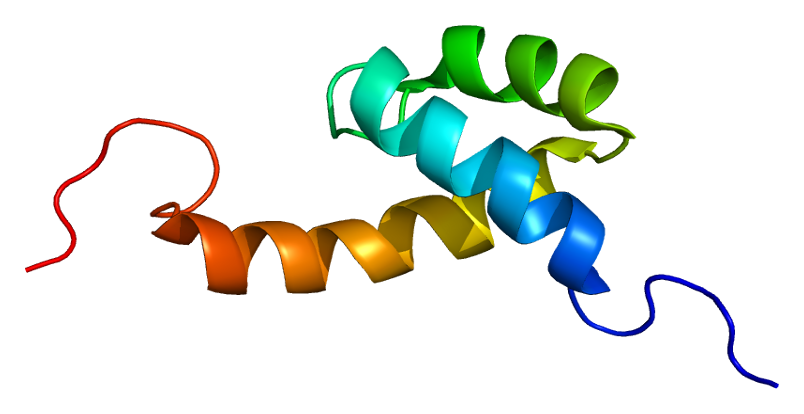

Identifiers
- Aliases: HOPX, CAMEO, HOD, HOP, LAGY, NECC1, OB1, SMAP31, TOTO, HOP homeobox
- External IDs: OMIM: 607275; MGI: 1916782; GeneCards: HOPX
Available structures
PDB	Ortholog search: PDBe RCSB
PDB	List of PDB id codes 1UHS, 2HI3

Gene location (Human)
Chr.	Chromosome 4 (human)
Band	4q12	Start	56,647,988 bp
Band	4q12	End	56,681,899 bp

Gene location (Mouse)
Chr.	Chromosome 5 (mouse)
Band	5|5 C3.3	Start	77,234,835 bp
Band	5|5 C3.3	End	77,262,968 bp
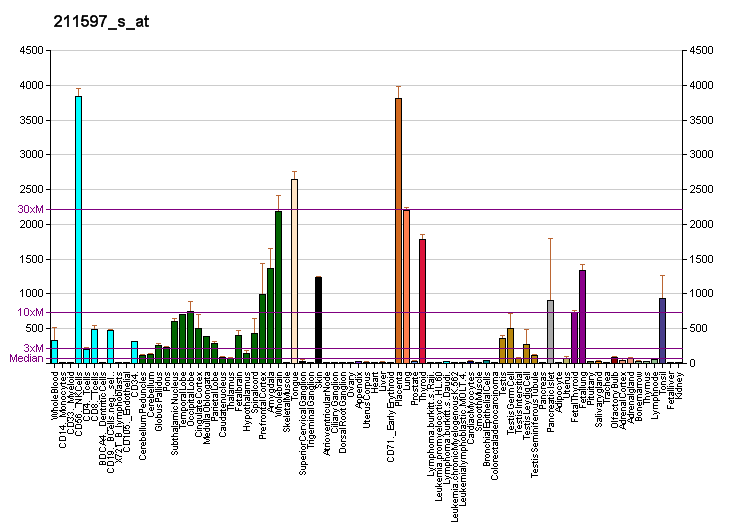
RNA expression pattern
Bgee	Human / Mouse (ortholog); Top expressed in: skin of thigh; corpus epididymis; skin of hip; mucosa of pharynx; human penis; oral cavity; skin of abdomen; vulva; right lung; upper lobe of left lung / Top expressed in: right lung lobe; left lung; superior surface of tongue; right ventricle; cardiac muscle tissue of left ventricle; left lung lobe; gastrula; esophagus; interventricular septum; transitional epithelium of urinary bladder; More reference expression data
BioGPS	More reference expression data
Gene ontology
Molecular function	DNA binding; protein binding; DNA-binding transcription factor activity, RNA polymerase II-specific
Cellular component	cytoplasm; nucleus
Biological process	regulation of transcription by RNA polymerase II; negative regulation of cell differentiation; multicellular organism development; regulation of transcription, DNA-templated; transcription, DNA-templated; trophectodermal cell differentiation; chaperone-mediated protein complex assembly; cell differentiation
Sources:Amigo / QuickGO
Orthologs
Databases	NCBI: entry; OMA: entry
Species	Human	Mouse
Entrez	84525	74318
Ensembl	ENSG00000171476	ENSMUSG00000059325
UniProt	Q9BPY8	Q8R1H0
RefSeq (mRNA)	NM_001145459; NM_001145460; NM_032495; NM_139211; NM_139212	NM_001159900; NM_001159901; NM_175606
RefSeq (protein)	NP_001138931; NP_001138932; NP_115884; NP_631957; NP_631958	NP_001153372; NP_001153373; NP_783199
Location (UCSC)	Chr 4: 56.65 – 56.68 Mb	Chr 5: 77.23 – 77.26 Mb
PubMed search
- Wikidata
View/Edit Human	View/Edit Mouse

Homeodomain-only protein is a protein that in humans is encoded by the HOPX gene. It is an important regulator of cardiac development and a marker of hippocampal neural stem cells.

== Function ==
The protein encoded by this gene is a homeodomain protein that lacks certain conserved residues required for DNA binding. It was reported that choriocarcinoma cell lines and tissues failed to express this gene, which suggested the possible involvement of this gene in malignant conversion of placental trophoblasts. Studies in mice suggested that this protein may interact with serum response factor (SRF) and modulate SRF-dependent cardiac-specific gene expression and cardiac development. Multiple alternatively spliced transcript variants encoding the same protein have been observed, the full-length natures of only some have been determined.
