= HOXD12 =

Protein-coding gene in humans

Identifiers
- Aliases: HOXD12, HOX4H, homeobox D12
- External IDs: OMIM: 142988; MGI: 96204; GeneCards: HOXD12

Gene location (Human)
Chr.	Chromosome 2 (human)
Band	2q31.1	Start	176,099,795 bp
Band	2q31.1	End	176,102,489 bp

Gene location (Mouse)
Chr.	Chromosome 2 (mouse)
Band	2 C3|2 44.13 cM	Start	74,505,357 bp
Band	2 C3|2 44.13 cM	End	74,508,049 bp
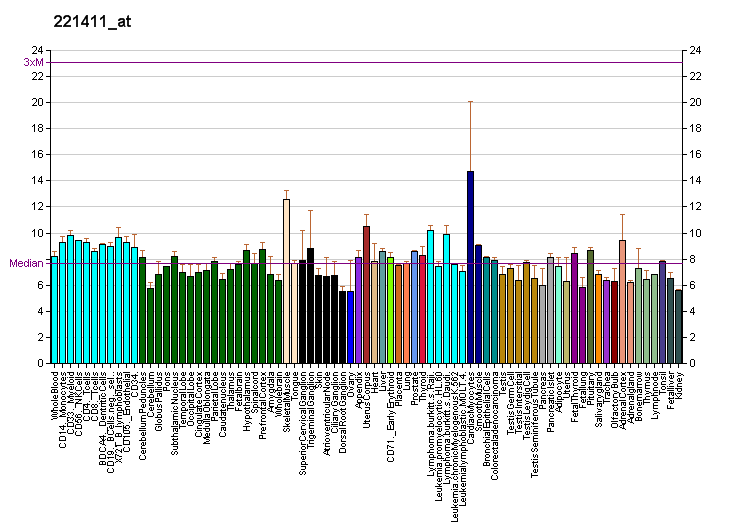
RNA expression pattern
Bgee	Human / Mouse (ortholog); Top expressed in: vagina; muscle layer of sigmoid colon; rectum; ectocervix; prostate; canal of the cervix; urinary bladder; wall of uterus; myometrium; kidney / Top expressed in: genital tubercle; urethra; tail of embryo; female urethra; male urethra; muscle layer of urethra; hand; epithelium of male urethra; footplate; sclerotome; More reference expression data
BioGPS	More reference expression data
Gene ontology
Molecular function	sequence-specific DNA binding; DNA binding; protein binding; DNA-binding transcription factor activity, RNA polymerase II-specific
Cellular component	nucleus; transcription regulator complex
Biological process	pattern specification process; multicellular organism development; skeletal system development; embryonic digit morphogenesis; regulation of transcription, DNA-templated; transcription, DNA-templated; regulation of transcription by RNA polymerase II
Sources:Amigo / QuickGO
Orthologs
Databases	NCBI: entry; OMA: entry
Species	Human	Mouse
Entrez	3238	15432
Ensembl	ENSG00000170178	ENSMUSG00000001823
UniProt	P35452	P23812
RefSeq (mRNA)	NM_021193	NM_008274
RefSeq (protein)	NP_067016	NP_032300
Location (UCSC)	Chr 2: 176.1 – 176.1 Mb	Chr 2: 74.51 – 74.51 Mb
PubMed search
- Wikidata
View/Edit Human	View/Edit Mouse

Homeobo protein Hox-D12 is a protein that in humans is encoded by the HOXD12 gene.

This gene belongs to the homeobox family of genes. The homeobox genes encode a highly conserved family of transcription factors that play an important role in morphogenesis in all multicellular organisms. Mammals possess four similar homeobox gene clusters, HOXA, HOXB, HOXC and HOXD, located on different chromosomes, consisting of 9 to 11 genes arranged in tandem. This gene is one of several homeobox HOXD genes located in a cluster on chromosome 2. Deletions that remove the entire HOXD gene cluster or the 5' end of this cluster have been associated with severe limb and genital abnormalities. The product of the mouse Hoxd12 gene plays a role in axial skeleton development and forelimb morphogenesis.

== See also ==
- Homeobox
