= LIM homeobox 9 =

Protein found in humans

LHX9

Identifiers
- Aliases: LHX9, LIM homeobox 9
- External IDs: OMIM: 606066; MGI: 1316721; GeneCards: LHX9
Available structures
PDB	Ortholog search: PDBe RCSB
PDB	List of PDB id codes 2DMQ

Gene location (Human)
Chr.	Chromosome 1 (human)
Band	1q31.3	Start	197,911,902 bp
Band	1q31.3	End	197,935,478 bp

Gene location (Mouse)
Chr.	Chromosome 1 (mouse)
Band	1|1 E4	Start	138,825,186 bp
Band	1|1 E4	End	138,848,577 bp
RNA expression pattern
Bgee	Human / Mouse (ortholog); Top expressed in: germinal epithelium; testicle; left ovary; right ovary; stromal cell of endometrium; ganglionic eminence; gonad; tendon of biceps brachii; right coronary artery; buccal mucosa cell / Top expressed in: hand; habenula; Gonadal ridge; fossa; coelomic epithelium; pineal gland; abdominal wall; medial dorsal nucleus; foot; inferior colliculi; More reference expression data
BioGPS	n/a
Gene ontology
Molecular function	sequence-specific DNA binding; DNA binding; protein binding; transcription corepressor activity; metal ion binding; DNA-binding transcription factor activity, RNA polymerase II-specific; RNA polymerase II transcription regulatory region sequence-specific DNA binding
Cellular component	nucleus
Biological process	cell population proliferation; male gonad development; negative regulation of transcription, DNA-templated; regulation of transcription, DNA-templated; female gonad development; gonad morphogenesis; dorsal spinal cord interneuron anterior axon guidance; regulation of transcription by RNA polymerase II; neuron differentiation; positive regulation of transcription by RNA polymerase II
Sources:Amigo / QuickGO
Orthologs
Databases	NCBI: entry; OMA: entry
Species	Human	Mouse
Entrez	56956	16876
Ensembl	ENSG00000143355	ENSMUSG00000019230
UniProt	Q9NQ69	Q9WUH2
RefSeq (mRNA)	NM_001014434; NM_020204; NM_001370213	NM_001025565; NM_001042577; NM_010714
RefSeq (protein)	NP_001014434; NP_064589; NP_001357142	NP_001020736; NP_001036042; NP_034844
Location (UCSC)	Chr 1: 197.91 – 197.94 Mb	Chr 1: 138.83 – 138.85 Mb
PubMed search
- Wikidata
View/Edit Human	View/Edit Mouse

LIM homeobox 9 is a protein that in humans is encoded by the LHX9 gene.

== Function ==
This gene encodes a member of the LIM homeobox gene family of developmentally expressed transcription factors. The encoded protein contains a homeodomain and two cysteine-rich zinc-binding LIM domains involved in protein-protein interactions. The protein is highly similar to a mouse protein that causes gonadal agenesis when inactivated, suggesting a role in gonadal development. Alternative splicing results in multiple transcript variants.
