= HOXD11 =

Protein-coding gene in humans

Identifiers
- Aliases: HOXD11, HOX4, HOX4F, homeobox D11
- External IDs: OMIM: 142986; MGI: 96203; GeneCards: HOXD11

Gene location (Human)
Chr.	Chromosome 2 (human)
Band	2q31.1	Start	176,104,216 bp
Band	2q31.1	End	176,109,754 bp

Gene location (Mouse)
Chr.	Chromosome 2 (mouse)
Band	2 C3|2 44.13 cM	Start	74,509,901 bp
Band	2 C3|2 44.13 cM	End	74,517,360 bp
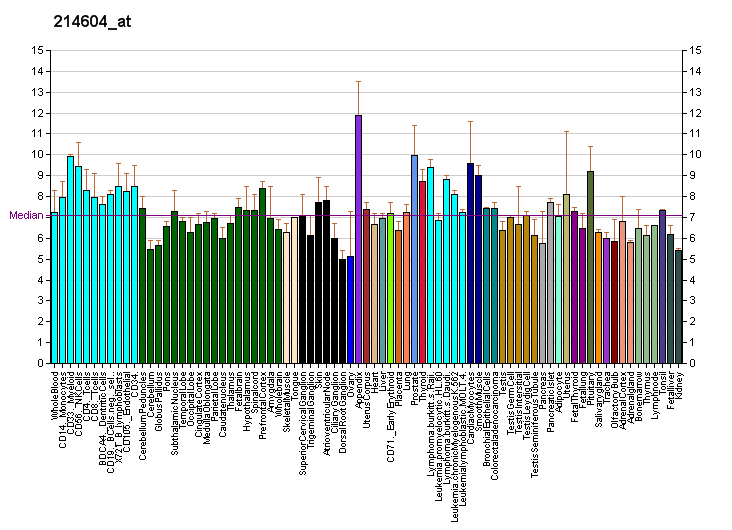
RNA expression pattern
Bgee	Human / Mouse (ortholog); Top expressed in: body of uterus; stromal cell of endometrium; Achilles tendon; urethra; myometrium; muscle layer of sigmoid colon; gonad; vagina; ectocervix; decidua / Top expressed in: tail of embryo; uterus; basal cell layer of epidermis; genital tubercle; granular layer of epidermis; urethra; male urethra; stroma of kidney; free upper limb; sclerotome; More reference expression data
BioGPS	More reference expression data
Gene ontology
Molecular function	sequence-specific DNA binding; DNA binding; DNA-binding transcription factor activity, RNA polymerase II-specific
Cellular component	nucleus; nucleoplasm
Biological process	multicellular organism development; branching involved in ureteric bud morphogenesis; regulation of transcription, DNA-templated; dorsal/ventral pattern formation; transcription, DNA-templated; regulation of transcription by RNA polymerase II
Sources:Amigo / QuickGO
Orthologs
Databases	NCBI: entry; OMA: entry
Species	Human	Mouse
Entrez	3237	15431
Ensembl	ENSG00000128713	ENSMUSG00000042499
UniProt	P31277	P23813
RefSeq (mRNA)	NM_021192	NM_008273
RefSeq (protein)	NP_067015	NP_032299
Location (UCSC)	Chr 2: 176.1 – 176.11 Mb	Chr 2: 74.51 – 74.52 Mb
PubMed search
- Wikidata
View/Edit Human	View/Edit Mouse

Homeobox protein Hox-D11 is a protein that in humans is encoded by the HOXD11 gene.

This gene belongs to the homeobox family of genes. The homeobox genes encode a highly conserved family of transcription factors that play an important role in morphogenesis in all multicellular organisms. Mammals possess four similar homeobox gene clusters, HOXA, HOXB, HOXC and HOXD, located on different chromosomes, consisting of 9 to 11 genes arranged in tandem. This gene is one of several homeobox HOXD genes located in a cluster on chromosome 2. Deletions that remove the entire HOXD gene cluster or the 5' end of this cluster have been associated with severe limb and genital abnormalities. The product of the mouse Hoxd11 gene plays a role in axial skeleton development and forelimb morphogenesis.

== See also ==
- Homeobox
