= HOXC12 =

Protein-coding gene in the species Homo sapiens

Identifiers
- Aliases: HOXC12, HOC3F, HOX3, HOX3F, homeobox C12
- External IDs: OMIM: 142975; MGI: 96194; GeneCards: HOXC12

Gene location (Human)
| Chr. | Chromosome 12 (human) |
| Band | 12q13.13 | Start | 53,954,903 bp |
| Band | 12q13.13 | End | 53,958,956 bp |

Gene location (Mouse)
| Chr. | Chromosome 15 (mouse) |
| Band | 15 F3|15 58.01 cM | Start | 102,845,192 bp |
| Band | 15 F3|15 58.01 cM | End | 102,847,044 bp |
RNA expression pattern
| Bgee | Human / Mouse (ortholog); Top expressed in: testicle; skin of leg; sural nerve; popliteal artery; tibial arteries; skin of abdomen; subcutaneous adipose tissue; olfactory zone of nasal mucosa; mammary gland; breast / Top expressed in: tail of embryo; genital tubercle; neural tube; hair follicle; mesenchyme; skeleton; leg; More reference expression data |
| BioGPS | n/a |
Gene ontology
| Molecular function | sequence-specific DNA binding; DNA binding; DNA-binding transcription factor activity, RNA polymerase II-specific |
| Cellular component | nucleus |
| Biological process | multicellular organism development; regulation of transcription, DNA-templated; transcription, DNA-templated; regulation of transcription by RNA polymerase II |
Sources:Amigo / QuickGO
Orthologs
| Databases | NCBI: entry; OMA: entry |
| Species | Human | Mouse |
| Entrez | 3228 | 15421 |
| Ensembl | ENSG00000123407 | ENSMUSG00000050328 |
| UniProt | P31275 | Q8K5B8 |
| RefSeq (mRNA) | NM_173860 | NM_010463 |
| RefSeq (protein) | NP_776272 | NP_034593 |
| Location (UCSC) | Chr 12: 53.95 – 53.96 Mb | Chr 15: 102.85 – 102.85 Mb |
| PubMed search |
- Wikidata
| View/Edit Human | View/Edit Mouse |

Homeobox C12 is a protein that in humans is encoded by the HOXC12 gene.

This gene belongs to the homeobox family of genes. The homeobox genes encode a highly conserved family of transcription factors that play an important role in morphogenesis in all multicellular organisms. Mammals possess four similar homeobox gene clusters, HOXA, HOXB, HOXC and HOXD, which are located on different chromosomes and consist of 9 to 11 genes arranged in tandem. This gene is one of several homeobox HOXC genes located in a cluster on chromosome 12.
