= TGIF2 =

Protein-coding gene in the species Homo sapiens

Identifiers
- Aliases: TGIF2, TGFB induced factor homeobox 2
- External IDs: OMIM: 607294; MGI: 1915299; GeneCards: TGIF2

Gene location (Human)
Chr.	Chromosome 20 (human)
Band	20q11.23	Start	36,573,488 bp
Band	20q11.23	End	36,593,950 bp

Gene location (Mouse)
Chr.	Chromosome 2 (mouse)
Band	2|2 H1	Start	156,681,927 bp
Band	2|2 H1	End	156,697,490 bp
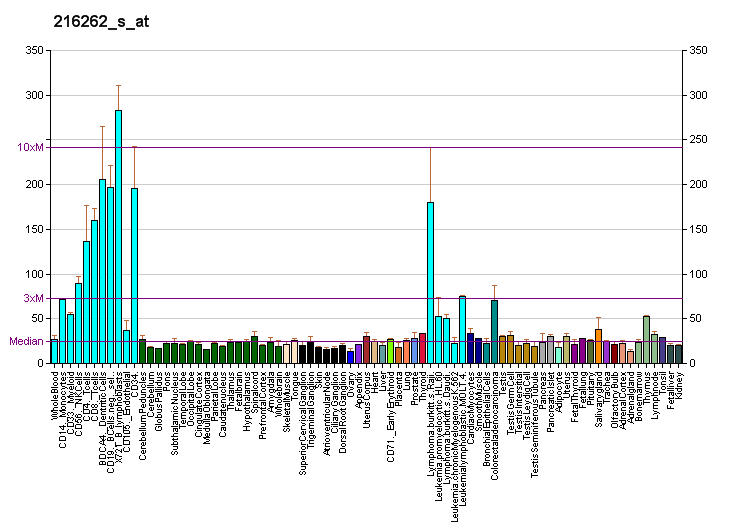

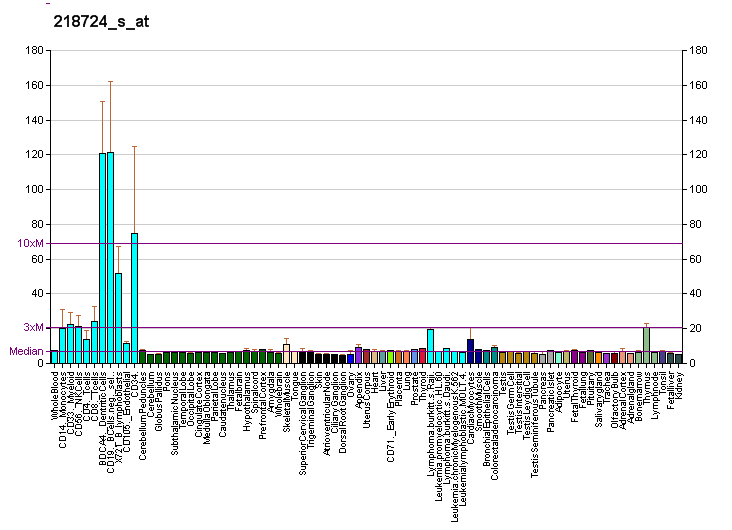
RNA expression pattern
Bgee	Human / Mouse (ortholog); Top expressed in: ventricular zone; embryo; ganglionic eminence; sural nerve; gonad; buccal mucosa cell; granulocyte; right uterine tube; testicle; monocyte / Top expressed in: ventricular zone; zygote; phalanx of finger; epiblast; tail of embryo; genital tubercle; embryo; thumb; mandibular prominence; maxillary prominence; More reference expression data
BioGPS	More reference expression data
Gene ontology
Molecular function	DNA-binding transcription factor activity; DNA binding; DNA-binding transcription factor activity, RNA polymerase II-specific
Cellular component	nucleus; nucleoplasm
Biological process	regulation of transcription, DNA-templated; negative regulation of transcription by RNA polymerase II; retina development in camera-type eye; regulation of gastrulation; positive regulation of neuron differentiation; nodal signaling pathway; transcription, DNA-templated
Sources:Amigo / QuickGO
Orthologs
Databases	NCBI: entry; OMA: entry
Species	Human	Mouse
Entrez	60436	228839
Ensembl	ENSG00000118707	ENSMUSG00000062175
UniProt	Q9GZN2	Q8C0Y1
RefSeq (mRNA)	NM_021809; NM_001199513; NM_001199514; NM_001199515	NM_001291124; NM_173396
RefSeq (protein)	NP_001186442; NP_001186443; NP_001186444; NP_068581	NP_001278053; NP_775572
Location (UCSC)	Chr 20: 36.57 – 36.59 Mb	Chr 2: 156.68 – 156.7 Mb
PubMed search
- Wikidata
View/Edit Human	View/Edit Mouse

Homeobox protein TGIF2 is a protein that in humans is encoded by the TGIF2 gene.

The protein encoded by this gene is a DNA-binding homeobox protein and a transcriptional repressor. The encoded protein appears to repress transcription by recruiting histone deacetylases to TGF beta-responsive genes. This gene is amplified and overexpressed in some ovarian cancers, and mutations in this gene can cause holoprosencephaly.
