= TLX3 =

Protein-coding gene in the species Homo sapiens

Identifiers
- Aliases: TLX3, HOX11L2, RNX, T-cell leukemia homeobox 3, T cell leukemia homeobox 3
- External IDs: OMIM: 604640; MGI: 1351209; GeneCards: TLX3

Gene location (Human)
Chr.	Chromosome 5 (human)
Band	5q35.1	Start	171,309,248 bp
Band	5q35.1	End	171,312,139 bp

Gene location (Mouse)
Chr.	Chromosome 11 (mouse)
Band	11|11 A4	Start	33,150,752 bp
Band	11|11 A4	End	33,153,589 bp
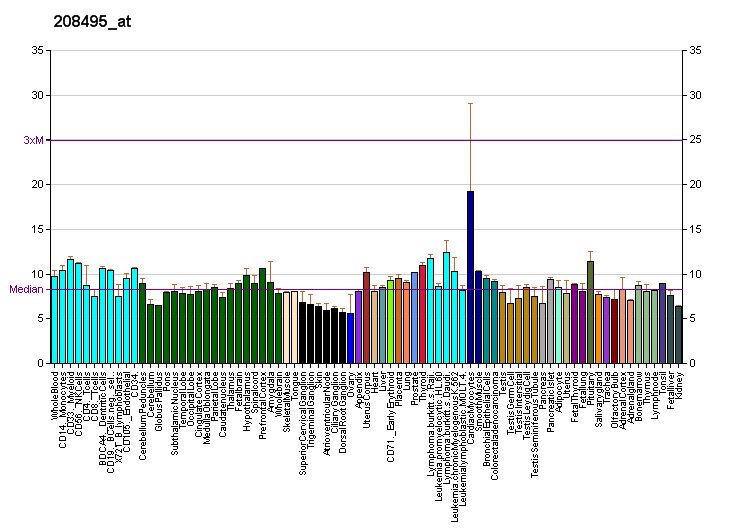
RNA expression pattern
Bgee	Human / Mouse (ortholog); Top expressed in: right hemisphere of cerebellum; C1 segment; pituitary gland; anterior pituitary; olfactory zone of nasal mucosa; Cortex of frontal lobe; female human reproductive system; oviduct; integument; zone of skin / Top expressed in: lumbar spinal ganglion; urethra; female urethra; male urethra; neural tube; enteric nervous system; trigeminal ganglion; embryo; ganglion of vagus nerve; glossopharyngeal ganglion; More reference expression data
BioGPS	More reference expression data
Gene ontology
Molecular function	sequence-specific DNA binding; DNA binding; protein binding; DNA-binding transcription factor activity, RNA polymerase II-specific; DNA-binding transcription factor activity
Cellular component	nucleus; nucleoplasm
Biological process	multicellular organism development; regulation of respiratory gaseous exchange by nervous system process; cell fate specification; neuron fate specification; central nervous system development; neuron migration; regulation of transcription, DNA-templated; negative regulation of neuron differentiation; respiratory gaseous exchange by respiratory system; neuron differentiation; regulation of transcription by RNA polymerase II
Sources:Amigo / QuickGO
Orthologs
Databases	NCBI: entry; OMA: entry
Species	Human	Mouse
Entrez	30012	27140
Ensembl	ENSG00000164438	ENSMUSG00000040610
UniProt	O43711	O55144
RefSeq (mRNA)	NM_021025	NM_019916
RefSeq (protein)	NP_066305	NP_064300
Location (UCSC)	Chr 5: 171.31 – 171.31 Mb	Chr 11: 33.15 – 33.15 Mb
PubMed search
- Wikidata
View/Edit Human	View/Edit Mouse

T-cell leukemia homeobox protein 3 is a protein that in humans is encoded by the TLX3 gene.

RNX (HOX11L2, TLX3) belongs to a family of orphan homeobox genes that encode DNA-binding nuclear transcription factors. Members of the HOX11 gene family are characterized by a threonine-47 replacing cytosine in the highly conserved homeodomain (Dear et al., 1993).[supplied by OMIM]
