= Sebox homeobox =

Protein-coding gene in the species Homo sapiens

SEBOX

Identifiers
- Aliases: SEBOX, OG-9, OG9, OG9X, Sebox homeobox
- External IDs: OMIM: 610975; MGI: 108012; GeneCards: SEBOX

Gene location (Human)
Chr.	Chromosome 17 (human)
Band	17q11.2	Start	28,363,506 bp
Band	17q11.2	End	28,365,199 bp

Gene location (Mouse)
Chr.	Chromosome 11 (mouse)
Band	11 B5|11 46.74 cM	Start	78,394,273 bp
Band	11 B5|11 46.74 cM	End	78,395,907 bp
RNA expression pattern
Bgee	Human / Mouse (ortholog); Top expressed in: testicle; right lobe of liver; granulocyte; skeletal muscle tissue; blood; monocyte; duodenum; left adrenal cortex; right adrenal gland; prefrontal cortex / Top expressed in: zygote; gastrula; secondary oocyte; neural layer of retina; primary oocyte; CA3 field; morula; granular layer of epidermis; Region II of hippocampus proper; submandibular gland; More reference expression data
BioGPS	n/a
Gene ontology
Molecular function	DNA binding; molecular function
Cellular component	nucleus; cellular component
Biological process	multicellular organism development; cell differentiation; regulation of transcription, DNA-templated; transcription, DNA-templated; biological process; embryo development ending in birth or egg hatching; oogenesis
Sources:Amigo / QuickGO
Orthologs
Databases	NCBI: entry; OMA: entry
Species	Human	Mouse
Entrez	645832	18292
Ensembl	ENSG00000274529	ENSMUSG00000001103
UniProt	Q9HB31	P70368
RefSeq (mRNA)	NM_001083896; NM_001080837	NM_008759
RefSeq (protein)	NP_001074306	NP_032785
Location (UCSC)	Chr 17: 28.36 – 28.37 Mb	Chr 11: 78.39 – 78.4 Mb
PubMed search
- Wikidata
View/Edit Human	View/Edit Mouse

SEBOX homeobox is a protein that in humans is encoded by the SEBOX gene. Sebox homeobox has a 92% similarity to genes found within rhesus macaque, or the rhesus monkey. It is thought that this is what causes the reddened glutius maximus coloring.

== Function ==
Homeodomain proteins, such as SEBOX, play a key role in coordinating gene expression during development.
