= NKX2-3 =

Protein-coding gene in the species Homo sapiens

Identifiers
- Aliases: NKX2-3, CSX3, NK2.3, NKX2.3, NKX2C, NKX4-3, NK2 homeobox 3
- External IDs: OMIM: 606727; MGI: 97348; GeneCards: NKX2-3

Gene location (Human)
Chr.	Chromosome 10 (human)
Band	10q24.2	Start	99,532,942 bp
Band	10q24.2	End	99,536,524 bp

Gene location (Mouse)
Chr.	Chromosome 19 (mouse)
Band	19 C3|19 36.67 cM	Start	43,600,764 bp
Band	19 C3|19 36.67 cM	End	43,604,331 bp
RNA expression pattern
Bgee	Human / Mouse (ortholog); Top expressed in: muscle layer of sigmoid colon; spleen; transverse colon; duodenum; sural nerve; minor salivary glands; jejunal mucosa; mucosa of transverse colon; cecum; rectum / Top expressed in: Hindgut; migratory enteric neural crest cell; yolk sac; Stomodeum; buccopharyngeal membrane; duodenum; pharyngeal pouch; ileum; tongue; embryo; More reference expression data
BioGPS	n/a
Gene ontology
Molecular function	sequence-specific DNA binding; DNA binding; molecular function; DNA-binding transcription factor activity, RNA polymerase II-specific; RNA polymerase II cis-regulatory region sequence-specific DNA binding; DNA-binding transcription factor activity
Cellular component	nucleus; cellular component
Biological process	leukocyte homeostasis; CD4-positive, alpha-beta T cell differentiation; post-embryonic digestive tract morphogenesis; regulation of transcription, DNA-templated; plasma cell differentiation; spleen development; post-embryonic development; transcription, DNA-templated; macrophage differentiation; mucosa-associated lymphoid tissue development; odontogenesis of dentin-containing tooth; gland morphogenesis; regulation of cell population proliferation; immune response; B cell differentiation; Peyer's patch development; digestive tract development; lymph node development; triglyceride metabolic process; leukocyte migration; positive regulation of transcription by RNA polymerase II; biological process; cell differentiation
Sources:Amigo / QuickGO
Orthologs
Databases	NCBI: entry; OMA: entry
Species	Human	Mouse
Entrez	159296	18089
Ensembl	ENSG00000119919	ENSMUSG00000044220
UniProt	Q8TAU0	P97334
RefSeq (mRNA)	NM_145285	NM_008699
RefSeq (protein)	NP_660328	NP_032725
Location (UCSC)	Chr 10: 99.53 – 99.54 Mb	Chr 19: 43.6 – 43.6 Mb
PubMed search
- Wikidata
View/Edit Human	View/Edit Mouse

Homeobox protein Nkx-2.3 is a protein that in humans is encoded by the NKX2-3 gene.

NKX2C is a member of the NKX family of homeodomain-containing transcription factors, which are implicated in many aspects of cell type specification and maintenance of differentiated tissue functions.
