= HOXD1 =

Protein-coding gene in the species Homo sapiens

Identifiers
- Aliases: HOXD1, HOX4, HOX4G, Hox-4.7, homeobox D1
- External IDs: OMIM: 142987; MGI: 96201; GeneCards: HOXD1

Gene location (Human)
| Chr. | Chromosome 2 (human) |
| Band | 2q31.1 | Start | 176,188,668 bp |
| Band | 2q31.1 | End | 176,190,907 bp |

Gene location (Mouse)
| Chr. | Chromosome 2 (mouse) |
| Band | 2 C3|2 44.13 cM | Start | 74,593,324 bp |
| Band | 2 C3|2 44.13 cM | End | 74,595,486 bp |
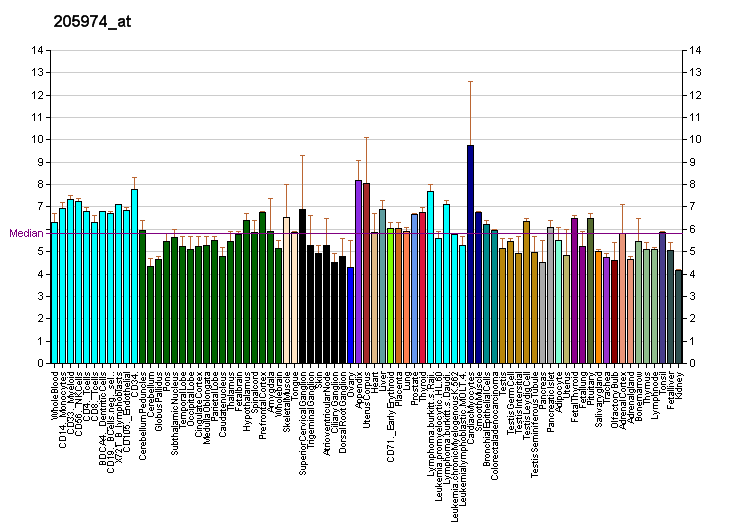

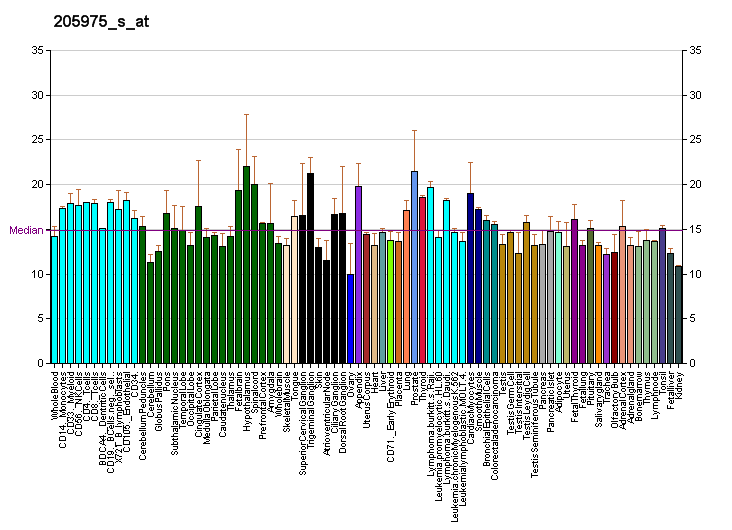
RNA expression pattern
| Bgee | Human / Mouse (ortholog); Top expressed in: corpus epididymis; gonad; metanephric glomerulus; C1 segment; secondary oocyte; spinal ganglia; caput epididymis; testicle; inferior ganglion of vagus nerve; mucosa of sigmoid colon / Top expressed in: lumbar spinal ganglion; trigeminal ganglion; tail of embryo; secondary follicle of ovary; germinal epithelium; primitive streak; somatopleuric mesenchyme; embryo; ovarian follicle cell; Bowman's capsule; More reference expression data |
| BioGPS | More reference expression data |
Gene ontology
| Molecular function | sequence-specific DNA binding; DNA binding; DNA-binding transcription factor activity, RNA polymerase II-specific |
| Cellular component | nucleus; nucleoplasm |
| Biological process | multicellular organism development; sensory perception of pain; regulation of transcription, DNA-templated; transcription, DNA-templated; neuron differentiation; embryonic skeletal system development; regulation of transcription by RNA polymerase II |
Sources:Amigo / QuickGO
Orthologs
| Databases | NCBI: entry; OMA: entry |
| Species | Human | Mouse |
| Entrez | 3231 | 15429 |
| Ensembl | ENSG00000128645 | ENSMUSG00000042448 |
| UniProt | Q9GZZ0 | Q01822 |
| RefSeq (mRNA) | NM_024501 | NM_010467 |
| RefSeq (protein) | NP_078777 | NP_034597 |
| Location (UCSC) | Chr 2: 176.19 – 176.19 Mb | Chr 2: 74.59 – 74.6 Mb |
| PubMed search |
- Wikidata
| View/Edit Human | View/Edit Mouse |

Homeobox protein Hox-D1 is a protein that in humans is encoded by the HOXD1 gene.

This gene is a member of the Antp homeobox family and encodes a protein with a homeobox DNA-binding domain. This nuclear protein functions as a sequence-specific transcription factor that is involved in differentiation and limb development. Mutations in this gene have been associated with severe developmental defects on the anterior-posterior (a-p) limb axis.

== See also ==
- Homeobox
