= HOXD9 =

Protein-coding gene in the species Homo sapiens

Identifiers
- Aliases: HOXD9, HOX4, HOX4C, Hox-4.3, Hox-5.2, homeobox D9
- External IDs: OMIM: 142982; MGI: 96210; GeneCards: HOXD9

Gene location (Human)
Chr.	Chromosome 2 (human)
Band	2q31.1	Start	176,122,719 bp
Band	2q31.1	End	176,124,937 bp

Gene location (Mouse)
Chr.	Chromosome 2 (mouse)
Band	2 C3|2 44.13 cM	Start	74,528,071 bp
Band	2 C3|2 44.13 cM	End	74,530,552 bp
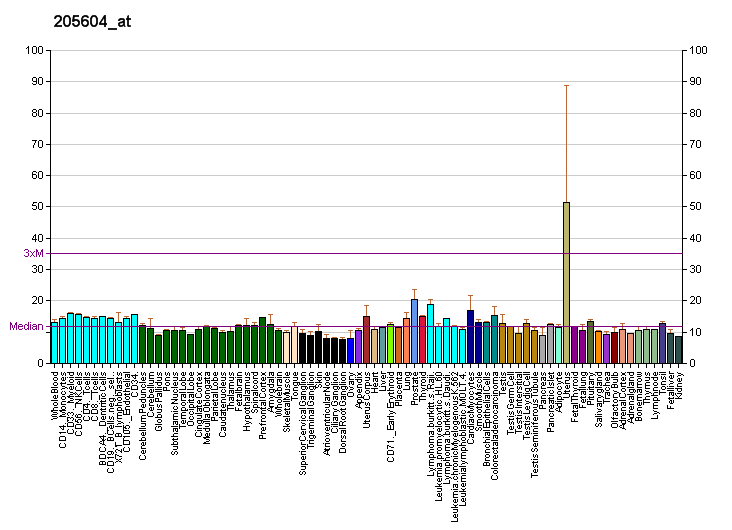
RNA expression pattern
Bgee	Human / Mouse (ortholog); Top expressed in: body of uterus; tendon of biceps brachii; canal of the cervix; vagina; ectocervix; myometrium; muscle layer of sigmoid colon; buccal mucosa cell; testicle; stromal cell of endometrium / Top expressed in: Gonadal ridge; gastrula; decidua; medullary collecting duct; endothelial cell of lymphatic vessel; seminal vesicula; medial head of gastrocnemius muscle; cumulus cell; tail of embryo; urothelium; More reference expression data
BioGPS	More reference expression data
Gene ontology
Molecular function	DNA binding; sequence-specific DNA binding; RNA polymerase II transcription regulatory region sequence-specific DNA binding; DNA-binding transcription factor activity; DNA-binding transcription repressor activity, RNA polymerase II-specific; DNA-binding transcription factor activity, RNA polymerase II-specific
Cellular component	nucleus; nucleolus
Biological process	embryonic skeletal system morphogenesis; forelimb morphogenesis; peripheral nervous system neuron development; proximal/distal pattern formation; regulation of transcription, DNA-templated; adult locomotory behavior; negative regulation of transcription by RNA polymerase II; hindlimb morphogenesis; transcription, DNA-templated; single fertilization; embryonic skeletal system development; mammary gland development; multicellular organism development; regulation of gene expression; skeletal muscle tissue development; embryonic forelimb morphogenesis; anterior/posterior pattern specification; positive regulation of transcription by RNA polymerase II
Sources:Amigo / QuickGO
Orthologs
Databases	NCBI: entry; OMA: entry
Species	Human	Mouse
Entrez	3235	15438
Ensembl	ENSG00000128709	ENSMUSG00000043342
UniProt	P28356	P28357
RefSeq (mRNA)	NM_014213	NM_013555
RefSeq (protein)	NP_055028	NP_038583
Location (UCSC)	Chr 2: 176.12 – 176.12 Mb	Chr 2: 74.53 – 74.53 Mb
PubMed search
- Wikidata
View/Edit Human	View/Edit Mouse

Homeobox protein Hox-D9 is a protein that in humans is encoded by the HOXD9 gene.

== Function ==
This gene belongs to the homeobox family of genes. The homeobox genes encode a highly conserved family of transcription factors that play an important role in morphogenesis in all multicellular organisms. Mammals possess four similar homeobox gene clusters, HOXA, HOXB, HOXC and HOXD, located on different chromosomes, consisting of 9 to 11 genes arranged in tandem. This gene is one of several homeobox HOXD genes located at 2q31-2q37 chromosome regions. Deletions that removed the entire HOXD gene cluster or 5' end of this cluster have been associated with severe limb and genital abnormalities. The exact role of this gene has not been determined.

== See also ==
- Homeobox
