= HOXA4 =

Protein-coding gene in the species Homo sapiens

Identifiers
- Aliases: HOXA4, HOX1, HOX1D, homeobox A4
- External IDs: OMIM: 142953; MGI: 96176; GeneCards: HOXA4

Gene location (Human)
Chr.	Chromosome 7 (human)
Band	7p15.2	Start	27,128,507 bp
Band	7p15.2	End	27,130,780 bp

Gene location (Mouse)
Chr.	Chromosome 6 (mouse)
Band	6 B3|6 25.4 cM	Start	52,166,651 bp
Band	6 B3|6 25.4 cM	End	52,168,733 bp
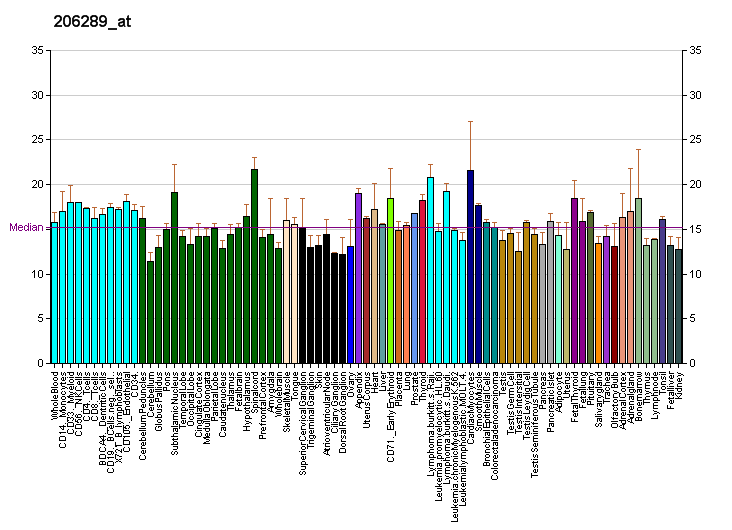
RNA expression pattern
Bgee	Human / Mouse (ortholog); Top expressed in: gastric mucosa; C1 segment; muscle of thigh; fallopian tube; Descending thoracic aorta; left uterine tube; right uterine tube; gastrocnemius muscle; right lung; mucosa of esophagus / Top expressed in: seminiferous tubule; hair bulb; spermatocyte; CA3 field; spermatid; inner root sheath; tail of embryo; brown adipose tissue; thyroid gland; outer root sheath of hair follicle; More reference expression data
BioGPS	More reference expression data
Gene ontology
Molecular function	DNA-binding transcription factor activity; sequence-specific DNA binding; DNA binding; DNA-binding transcription factor activity, RNA polymerase II-specific; RNA polymerase II transcription regulatory region sequence-specific DNA binding; DNA-binding transcription activator activity, RNA polymerase II-specific
Cellular component	nucleus; nuclear body
Biological process	multicellular organism development; anatomical structure morphogenesis; regulation of transcription, DNA-templated; transcription, DNA-templated; regulation of transcription by RNA polymerase II; skeletal system development; anterior/posterior pattern specification; positive regulation of transcription by RNA polymerase II; embryonic skeletal system morphogenesis
Sources:Amigo / QuickGO
Orthologs
Databases	NCBI: entry; OMA: entry
Species	Human	Mouse
Entrez	3201	15401
Ensembl	ENSG00000197576	ENSMUSG00000000942
UniProt	Q00056	P06798
RefSeq (mRNA)	NM_002141	NM_008265
RefSeq (protein)	NP_002132	NP_032291
Location (UCSC)	Chr 7: 27.13 – 27.13 Mb	Chr 6: 52.17 – 52.17 Mb
PubMed search
- Wikidata
View/Edit Human	View/Edit Mouse

Homeobox A4, also known as HOXA4, is a protein which in humans is encoded by the HOXA4 gene.

== Function ==
In vertebrates, the genes encoding the class of transcription factors called homeobox genes are found in clusters named A, B, C, and D on four separate chromosomes. Expression of these proteins is spatially and temporally regulated during embryonic development. This gene is part of the A cluster on chromosome 7 and encodes a DNA-binding transcription factor which may regulate gene expression, morphogenesis, and differentiation.

== See also ==
- Homeobox
