= ESX1 =

Protein-coding gene in humans

Identifiers
- Aliases: ESX1, ESX1L, ESXR1, ESX homeobox 1
- External IDs: OMIM: 300154; GeneCards: ESX1

Gene location (Human)
| Chr. | X chromosome (human) |
| Band | Xq22.2 | Start | 104,250,038 bp |
| Band | Xq22.2 | End | 104,254,933 bp |
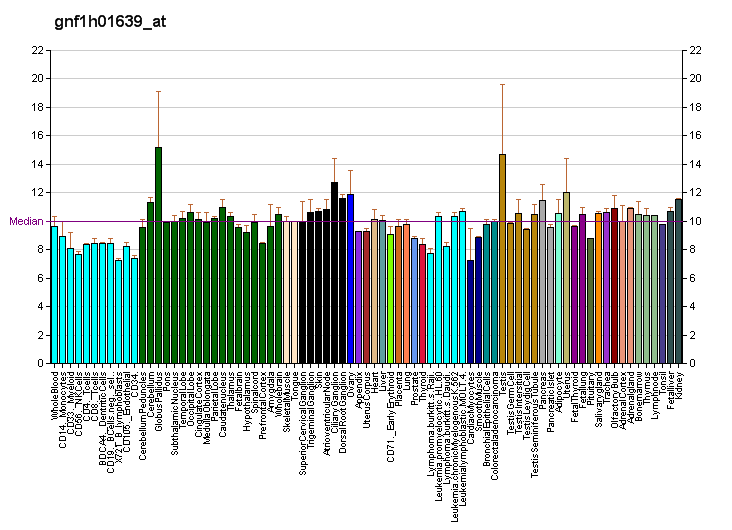
RNA expression pattern
| Bgee | Human / Mouse (ortholog); Top expressed in: testicle; right testis; left testis; gonad; epithelium of colon; placenta; endometrium; human musculoskeletal system; muscular system; skeletal muscle / n/a; More reference expression data |
| BioGPS | More reference expression data |
Gene ontology
| Molecular function | DNA binding; RNA polymerase II transcription regulatory region sequence-specific DNA binding; DNA-binding transcription repressor activity, RNA polymerase II-specific; sequence-specific DNA binding; DNA-binding transcription factor activity, RNA polymerase II-specific |
| Cellular component | nucleus; cytoplasm; nuclear speck |
| Biological process | negative regulation of transcription, DNA-templated; negative regulation of transcription by RNA polymerase II; regulation of transcription, DNA-templated; transcription, DNA-templated; regulation of cell cycle |
Sources:Amigo / QuickGO
Orthologs
| Databases | NCBI: entry; OMA: entry |
| Species | Human | Mouse |
| Entrez | 80712 | n/a |
| Ensembl | ENSG00000123576 | n/a |
| UniProt | Q8N693 | n/a |
| RefSeq (mRNA) | NM_153448 | n/a |
| RefSeq (protein) | NP_703149 | n/a |
| Location (UCSC) | Chr X: 104.25 – 104.25 Mb | n/a |
| PubMed search | | n/a |
- Wikidata
| View/Edit Human |

Homeobox protein ESX1 is a protein that in humans is encoded by the ESX1 gene.
