= BARHL2 =

Protein-coding gene in humans

Identifiers
- Aliases: BARHL2, BarH like homeobox 2
- External IDs: OMIM: 605212; MGI: 1859314; GeneCards: BARHL2

Gene location (Human)
Chr.	Chromosome 1 (human)
Band	1p22.2	Start	90,711,539 bp
Band	1p22.2	End	90,717,302 bp

Gene location (Mouse)
Chr.	Chromosome 5 (mouse)
Band	5|5 E5	Start	106,600,389 bp
Band	5|5 E5	End	106,606,032 bp
RNA expression pattern
Bgee	Human / Mouse (ortholog); Top expressed in: cerebellum; cerebellar cortex; cerebellar hemisphere; right hemisphere of cerebellum; gonad; testicle; right testis; left testis; hypothalamus; C1 segment / Top expressed in: internal carotid artery; external carotid artery; cerebellum; cerebellar cortex; epithelium of small intestine; neural layer of retina; knee joint; pineal gland; lobe of cerebellum; posterior horn of spinal cord; More reference expression data
BioGPS	n/a
Gene ontology
Molecular function	DNA binding; sequence-specific DNA binding; RNA polymerase II transcription regulatory region sequence-specific DNA binding; DNA-binding transcription activator activity, RNA polymerase II-specific; DNA-binding transcription factor activity; protein binding; DNA-binding transcription factor activity, RNA polymerase II-specific
Cellular component	nucleus
Biological process	cell fate commitment; regulation of transcription, DNA-templated; regulation of axon extension; regulation of transcription by RNA polymerase II; neuron migration; transcription by RNA polymerase II; positive regulation of translation; transcription, DNA-templated; nervous system development; neuron differentiation; cell fate determination; positive regulation of transcription by RNA polymerase II; tissue development; animal organ development
Sources:Amigo / QuickGO
Orthologs
Databases	NCBI: entry; OMA: entry
Species	Human	Mouse
Entrez	343472	104382
Ensembl	ENSG00000143032	ENSMUSG00000034384
UniProt	Q9NY43	Q8VIB5
RefSeq (mRNA)	NM_020063	NM_001005477
RefSeq (protein)	NP_064447	NP_001005477
Location (UCSC)	Chr 1: 90.71 – 90.72 Mb	Chr 5: 106.6 – 106.61 Mb
PubMed search
- Wikidata
View/Edit Human	View/Edit Mouse

BarH-like homeobox 2 is a protein in humans that is encoded by the BARHL2 gene.
