= MKX =

Protein-coding gene in the species Homo sapiens

Identifiers
- Aliases: MKX, C10orf48, IFRX, IRXL1, mohawk homeobox
- External IDs: OMIM: 601332; MGI: 2687286; GeneCards: MKX

Gene location (Human)
Chr.	Chromosome 10 (human)
Band	10p12.1	Start	27,672,874 bp
Band	10p12.1	End	27,746,060 bp

Gene location (Mouse)
Chr.	Chromosome 18 (mouse)
Band	18 A1|18 4.53 cM	Start	6,934,518 bp
Band	18 A1|18 4.53 cM	End	7,004,780 bp
RNA expression pattern
Bgee	Human / Mouse (ortholog); Top expressed in: Achilles tendon; endothelial cell; right coronary artery; prostate; popliteal artery; tibial arteries; testicle; stromal cell of endometrium; anterior pituitary; left coronary artery / Top expressed in: hand; cumulus cell; somite; foot; genital tubercle; lacrimal gland; female urethra; tail of embryo; desmocranium; calvaria; More reference expression data
BioGPS	n/a
Gene ontology
Molecular function	sequence-specific DNA binding; DNA binding; DNA-binding transcription factor activity, RNA polymerase II-specific
Cellular component	nucleus
Biological process	regulation of transcription, DNA-templated; muscle organ development; multicellular organism development; regulation of transcription by RNA polymerase II
Sources:Amigo / QuickGO
Orthologs
Databases	NCBI: entry; OMA: entry
Species	Human	Mouse
Entrez	283078	210719
Ensembl	ENSG00000150051	ENSMUSG00000061013
UniProt	Q8IYA7	Q8BIA3
RefSeq (mRNA)	NM_001242702; NM_173576	NM_177595
RefSeq (protein)	NP_001229631; NP_775847	NP_808263
Location (UCSC)	Chr 10: 27.67 – 27.75 Mb	Chr 18: 6.93 – 7 Mb
PubMed search
- Wikidata
View/Edit Human	View/Edit Mouse

Homeobox protein Mohawk, also known as iroquois homeobox protein-like 1, is a protein that in humans is encoded by the MKX (mohawk homeobox) gene. MKX is a member of an Iroquois (IRX) family-related class of 'three-amino acid loop extension' (TALE) atypical homeobox proteins characterized by 3 additional amino acids in the loop region between helix I and helix II of the homeodomain.

== Function ==
MKX is a transcription factor that regulates tendon differentiation during embryological development. Knocking out this gene in mouse embryos results in them developing hypoplastic tendons containing less type I collagen. MKX binds directly to the promoter of MyoD and represses its expression, negatively regulating muscle differentiation.

Expression of MKX is maintained in adult tendon tissues, decreasing as a result of ageing or osteoarthritis. Collagen fibres in tendons become more dense and thick following mechanical stimulation as a result of exercise, and MKX is essential in this mechanosensory process.
