= Tetrapeptide repeat homeobox 1 =

Protein-coding gene in the species Homo sapiens

TPRX1

Identifiers
- Aliases: TPRX1, TPRX, tetra-peptide repeat homeobox 1, tetrapeptide repeat homeobox 1
- External IDs: OMIM: 611166; GeneCards: TPRX1

Gene location (Human)
Chr.	Chromosome 19 (human)
Band	19q13.33	Start	47,801,243 bp
Band	19q13.33	End	47,819,051 bp
RNA expression pattern
Bgee	Human / Mouse (ortholog); Top expressed in: gonad; left testis; right testis; cerebellum; cerebellar hemisphere / n/a; More reference expression data
BioGPS	n/a
Gene ontology
Molecular function	DNA binding; DNA-binding transcription factor activity, RNA polymerase II-specific
Cellular component	nucleus
Biological process	regulation of transcription by RNA polymerase II
Sources:Amigo / QuickGO
Orthologs
Databases	NCBI: entry; OMA: entry
Species	Human	Mouse
Entrez	284355	n/a
Ensembl	ENSG00000178928	n/a
UniProt	Q8N7U7	n/a
RefSeq (mRNA)	NM_198479; NM_001397346	n/a
RefSeq (protein)	NP_940881	n/a
Location (UCSC)	Chr 19: 47.8 – 47.82 Mb	n/a
PubMed search		n/a
- Wikidata
View/Edit Human

Tetrapeptide repeat homeobox 1 is a protein that in humans is encoded by the TPRX1 gene.

== Function ==
Homeobox genes encode DNA-binding proteins, many of which are thought to be involved in early embryonic development. Homeobox genes encode a DNA-binding domain of 60 to 63 amino acids referred to as the homeodomain. This gene is a member of the TPRX homeobox gene family. [provided by RefSeq, Jul 2008].
