= LHX6 =

Protein-coding gene in the species Homo sapiens

Identifiers
- Aliases: LHX6, LHX6.1, LIM homeobox 6, hLHX6
- External IDs: OMIM: 608215; MGI: 1306803; GeneCards: LHX6

Gene location (Human)
Chr.	Chromosome 9 (human)
Band	9q33.2	Start	122,202,577 bp
Band	9q33.2	End	122,229,626 bp

Gene location (Mouse)
Chr.	Chromosome 2 (mouse)
Band	2|2 B	Start	35,971,965 bp
Band	2|2 B	End	35,995,420 bp
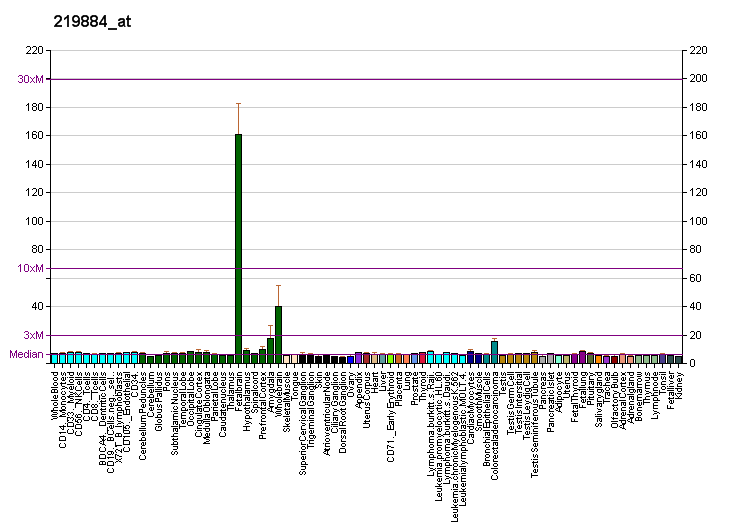
RNA expression pattern
Bgee	Human / Mouse (ortholog); Top expressed in: gonad; subcutaneous adipose tissue; prefrontal cortex; anterior cingulate cortex; endothelial cell; orbitofrontal cortex; Brodmann area 46; ganglionic eminence; visceral pleura; parietal pleura / Top expressed in: medial ganglionic eminence; maxillary prominence; molar; entorhinal cortex; barrel cortex; CA3 field; perirhinal cortex; mandibular prominence; globus pallidus; female urethra; More reference expression data
BioGPS	More reference expression data
Gene ontology
Molecular function	DNA-binding transcription factor activity; sequence-specific DNA binding; DNA binding; protein binding; metal ion binding; DNA-binding transcription factor activity, RNA polymerase II-specific; RNA polymerase II transcription regulatory region sequence-specific DNA binding
Cellular component	nucleus
Biological process	multicellular organism development; cerebral cortex GABAergic interneuron migration; cell differentiation; regulation of transcription, DNA-templated; cerebral cortex radially oriented cell migration; cerebral cortex tangential migration; cell maturation; transcription, DNA-templated; nervous system development; regulation of transcription by RNA polymerase II; forebrain neuron development; neuron differentiation; positive regulation of transcription by RNA polymerase II
Sources:Amigo / QuickGO
Orthologs
Databases	NCBI: entry; OMA: entry
Species	Human	Mouse
Entrez	26468	16874
Ensembl	ENSG00000106852	ENSMUSG00000026890
UniProt	Q9UPM6	Q9R1R0
RefSeq (mRNA)	NM_001242333; NM_001242334; NM_001242335; NM_014368; NM_199160 NM_001348190	NM_001083125; NM_001083126; NM_001083127; NM_008500; NM_001355125
RefSeq (protein)	NP_001229262; NP_001229263; NP_001229264; NP_055183; NP_954629 NP_001335119; NP_001229263.1	NP_001076594; NP_001076595; NP_001076596; NP_032526; NP_001342054
Location (UCSC)	Chr 9: 122.2 – 122.23 Mb	Chr 2: 35.97 – 36 Mb
PubMed search
- Wikidata
View/Edit Human	View/Edit Mouse

LIM/homeobox protein Lhx6 is a protein that in humans is encoded by the LHX6 gene.

This gene encodes a member of a large protein family that contains the LIM domain, a unique cysteine-rich zinc-binding domain. The encoded protein may function as a transcriptional regulator and may be involved in the control of differentiation and development of neural and lymphoid cells. Two alternatively spliced transcript variants encoding distinct isoforms have been described for this gene. Alternatively spliced transcript variants have been identified, but their biological validity has not been determined.
