= POU class 3 homeobox 3 =

Protein-coding gene in the species Homo sapiens

POU3F3

Identifiers
- Aliases: POU3F3, BRN1, OTF8, brain-1, oct-8, POU class 3 homeobox 3, SNIBFIS
- External IDs: OMIM: 602480; MGI: 102564; GeneCards: POU3F3

Gene location (Human)
Chr.	Chromosome 2 (human)
Band	2q12.1	Start	104,853,287 bp
Band	2q12.1	End	104,858,574 bp

Gene location (Mouse)
Chr.	Chromosome 1 (mouse)
Band	1 B|1 21.21 cM	Start	42,734,085 bp
Band	1 B|1 21.21 cM	End	42,742,336 bp
RNA expression pattern
Bgee	Human / Mouse (ortholog); Top expressed in: ventricular zone; ganglionic eminence; corpus epididymis; renal medulla; seminal vesicula; internal globus pallidus; caput epididymis; inferior ganglion of vagus nerve; postcentral gyrus; external globus pallidus / Top expressed in: medial ganglionic eminence; ventricular zone; globus pallidus; Rostral migratory stream; medullary collecting duct; dorsal tegmental nucleus; lower lip; ventral tegmental area; deep cerebellar nuclei; dorsomedial hypothalamic nucleus; More reference expression data
BioGPS	n/a
Gene ontology
Molecular function	sequence-specific DNA binding; DNA binding; DNA-binding transcription factor activity; HMG box domain binding; DNA-binding transcription factor activity, RNA polymerase II-specific
Cellular component	nucleus
Biological process	regulation of transcription, DNA-templated; kidney development; regulation of transcription by RNA polymerase II; negative regulation of apoptotic process; transcription, DNA-templated; nervous system development; metanephric ascending thin limb development; positive regulation of transcription, DNA-templated; multicellular organism development; central nervous system development; forebrain ventricular zone progenitor cell division; brain development; positive regulation of gene expression; metanephric loop of Henle development; positive regulation of cell population proliferation; negative regulation of transcription, DNA-templated; cerebral cortex radially oriented cell migration; metanephric thick ascending limb development; positive regulation of transcription by RNA polymerase II; metanephric DCT cell differentiation; metanephric macula densa development; excretion; chemical homeostasis
Sources:Amigo / QuickGO
Orthologs
Databases	NCBI: entry; OMA: entry
Species	Human	Mouse
Entrez	5455	18993
Ensembl	ENSG00000198914	ENSMUSG00000045515
UniProt	P20264	P31361
RefSeq (mRNA)	NM_006236	NM_008900
RefSeq (protein)	NP_006227	NP_032926
Location (UCSC)	Chr 2: 104.85 – 104.86 Mb	Chr 1: 42.73 – 42.74 Mb
PubMed search
- Wikidata
View/Edit Human	View/Edit Mouse

POU class 3 homeobox 3 is a protein that in humans is encoded by the POU3F3 gene.

== Function ==
This gene encodes a POU-domain containing protein that functions as a transcription factor. The encoded protein recognizes an octamer sequence in the DNA of target genes. This protein may play a role in development of the nervous system. [provided by RefSeq, Apr 2015].
