= BARX homeobox 1 =

Human protein

BARX1

Identifiers
- Aliases: BARX1, BARX homeobox 1
- External IDs: OMIM: 603260; MGI: 103124; GeneCards: BARX1
Available structures
PDB	Ortholog search: PDBe RCSB
PDB	List of PDB id codes 2DMT

Gene location (Human)
Chr.	Chromosome 9 (human)
Band	9q22.32	Start	93,951,627 bp
Band	9q22.32	End	93,955,355 bp

Gene location (Mouse)
Chr.	Chromosome 13 (mouse)
Band	13 A5|13 24.9 cM	Start	48,816,474 bp
Band	13 A5|13 24.9 cM	End	48,819,983 bp
RNA expression pattern
Bgee	Human / Mouse (ortholog); Top expressed in: gastric mucosa; body of stomach; fundus; gonad; cartilage tissue; periodontal fiber; pylorus; cardia; left testis; right testis / Top expressed in: mandibular prominence; internal carotid artery; maxillary prominence; molar; desmocranium; urethra; stomach; male urethra; Jacobson's organ; embryo; More reference expression data
BioGPS	n/a
Gene ontology
Molecular function	DNA-binding transcription factor activity; DNA-binding transcription activator activity, RNA polymerase II-specific; DNA binding; sequence-specific DNA binding; RNA polymerase II transcription regulatory region sequence-specific DNA binding; DNA-binding transcription factor activity, RNA polymerase II-specific
Cellular component	nucleus
Biological process	regulation of transcription by RNA polymerase II; cell-cell signaling; negative regulation of Wnt signaling pathway; regulation of transcription, DNA-templated; epithelial cell differentiation; spleen development; transcription, DNA-templated; anterior/posterior pattern specification; nervous system development; anatomical structure development; positive regulation of transcription by RNA polymerase II; animal organ development; digestive system development; transcription by RNA polymerase II; tissue development
Sources:Amigo / QuickGO
Orthologs
Databases	NCBI: entry; OMA: entry
Species	Human	Mouse
Entrez	56033	12022
Ensembl	ENSG00000131668	ENSMUSG00000021381
UniProt	Q9HBU1	Q9ER42
RefSeq (mRNA)	NM_021570	NM_007526
RefSeq (protein)	NP_067545	NP_031552
Location (UCSC)	Chr 9: 93.95 – 93.96 Mb	Chr 13: 48.82 – 48.82 Mb
PubMed search
- Wikidata
View/Edit Human	View/Edit Mouse

BARX homeobox 1 is a protein that in humans is encoded by the BARX1 gene.

== Function ==
This gene encodes a member of the Bar subclass of homeobox transcription factors. Studies of the mouse and chick homolog suggest the encoded protein may play a role in developing teeth and craniofacial mesenchyme of neural crest origin. The protein may also be associated with differentiation of stomach epithelia. [provided by RefSeq, Jul 2008].
