= TSHZ3 =

Protein-coding gene in the species Homo sapiens

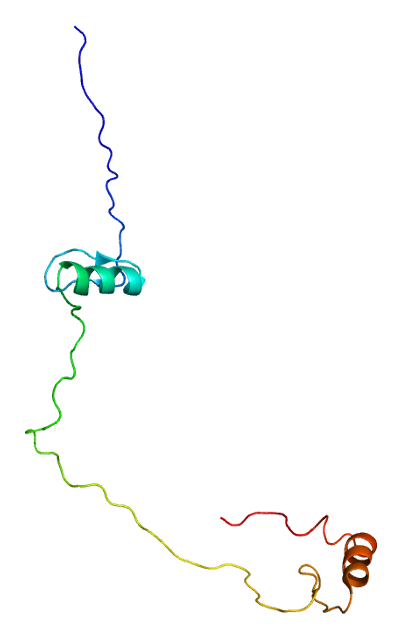

Identifiers
- Aliases: TSHZ3, TSH3, ZNF537, teashirt zinc finger homeobox 3
- External IDs: OMIM: 614119; MGI: 2442819; GeneCards: TSHZ3
Available structures
PDB	Ortholog search: PDBe RCSB
PDB	List of PDB id codes 2DMI

Gene location (Human)
Chr.	Chromosome 19 (human)
Band	19q12	Start	31,149,979 bp
Band	19q12	End	31,349,436 bp

Gene location (Mouse)
Chr.	Chromosome 7 (mouse)
Band	7|7 B2	Start	36,397,543 bp
Band	7|7 B2	End	36,472,978 bp
RNA expression pattern
Bgee	Human / Mouse (ortholog); Top expressed in: right ovary; left ovary; smooth muscle tissue; tail of epididymis; body of uterus; myometrium; canal of the cervix; endometrium; left uterine tube; saphenous vein / Top expressed in: stroma of kidney; ascending aorta; aortic valve; piriform cortex; coelomic epithelium; vas deferens; external carotid artery; internal carotid artery; Gonadal ridge; prefrontal cortex; More reference expression data
BioGPS	n/a
Gene ontology
Molecular function	metal ion binding; DNA binding; chromatin binding; protein binding; DNA-binding transcription repressor activity, RNA polymerase II-specific; nucleic acid binding; DNA-binding transcription factor activity, RNA polymerase II-specific
Cellular component	cell projection; growth cone; nucleus; nucleoplasm
Biological process	regulation of gene expression; regulation of transcription, DNA-templated; transcription, DNA-templated; regulation of respiratory gaseous exchange by nervous system process; negative regulation of transcription, DNA-templated; multicellular organism development; regulation of transcription by RNA polymerase II; negative regulation of transcription by RNA polymerase II; positive regulation of synaptic transmission, glutamatergic; long-term potentiation
Sources:Amigo / QuickGO
Orthologs
Databases	NCBI: entry; OMA: entry
Species	Human	Mouse
Entrez	57616	243931
Ensembl	ENSG00000121297	ENSMUSG00000021217
UniProt	Q63HK5	Q8CGV9
RefSeq (mRNA)	NM_020856	NM_172298
RefSeq (protein)	NP_065907	NP_758502
Location (UCSC)	Chr 19: 31.15 – 31.35 Mb	Chr 7: 36.4 – 36.47 Mb
PubMed search
- Wikidata
View/Edit Human	View/Edit Mouse

Teashirt homolog 3 is a protein that in humans is encoded by the TSHZ3 gene. In mice, it is a necessary part of the neural circuitry that controls breathing. The gene is also a homolog of the Drosophila melanogaster teashirt gene, which encodes a zinc finger transcription factor important for development of the trunk.

Tshz3-knockout mice do not develop the respiratory rhythm generator (RRG) neural circuit, which is a pacemaker that produces an oscillating rhythm in the brainstem and controls autonomous breathing. The RRG neurons are present, but are abnormal. Those mice do not survive because they don't initiate breathing after birth. Tshz3 is being studied for its relationship to infant breathing defects in humans.

TSHZ3 has been identified as a critical region for a syndrome associated with heterozygous deletions at 19q12-q13.11, which includes autism spectrum disorder (ASD) symptoms such autistic traits, speech disturbance and intellectual disability, as well as renal tract abnormalities. Mice with heterozygous Tshz3 deletion (Tshz3^{lacZ}^{/+}) show enrichment of ASD-related gene orthologs in the cerebral cortex, functional alterations of corticostriatal circuitry and ASD-relevant behavioral abnormalities.

Postnatal conditional deletion of Tshz3 in mouse induces behavioral deficits mimicking ASD, as well as abnormalities in synaptic transmission and plasticity in the corticostriatal circuit. These changes are associated to dysregulation of the cortical expression of more than 1000 genes, in particular coding for synaptic components, half of which has human orthologues involved in ASD.
