= POU2F3 =

Protein-coding gene in the species Homo sapiens

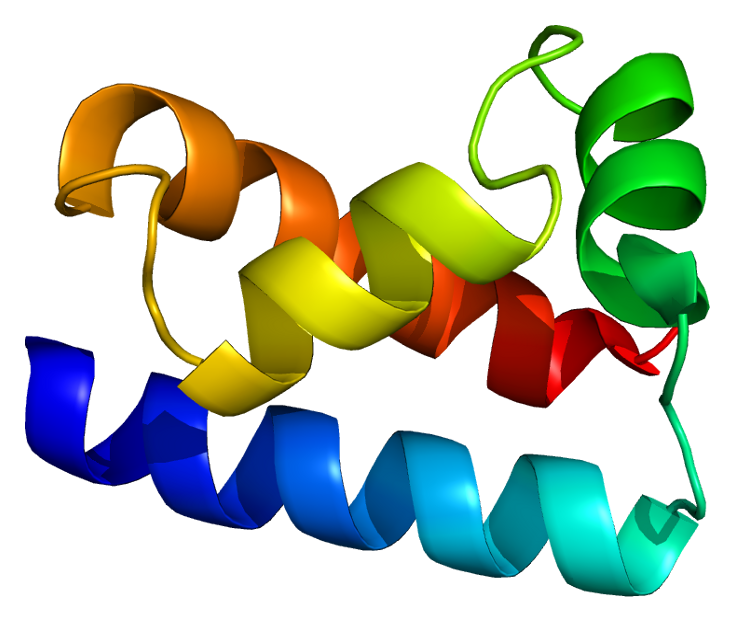

Identifiers
- Aliases: POU2F3, Epoc-1, OCT-11, OCT11, OTF-11, PLA-1, PLA1, Skn-1a, POU class 2 homeobox 3
- External IDs: OMIM: 607394; MGI: 102565; GeneCards: POU2F3

Gene location (Human)
Chr.	Chromosome 11 (human)
Band	11q23.3	Start	120,236,640 bp
Band	11q23.3	End	120,319,945 bp

Gene location (Mouse)
Chr.	Chromosome 9 (mouse)
Band	9 A5.1|9 24.21 cM	Start	43,035,234 bp
Band	9 A5.1|9 24.21 cM	End	43,121,666 bp
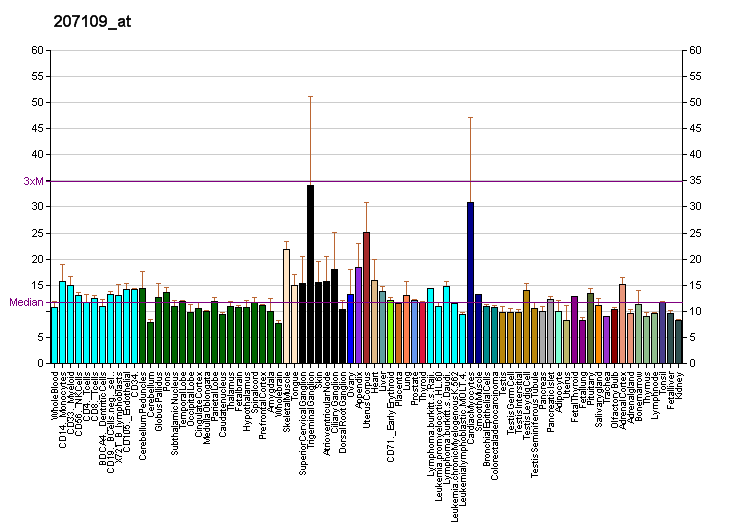
RNA expression pattern
Bgee	Human / Mouse (ortholog); Top expressed in: skin of abdomen; skin of leg; skin of thigh; skin of hip; nipple; skin of arm; vulva; palpebral conjunctiva; human penis; mucosa of transverse colon / Top expressed in: lip; gastrula; Ileal epithelium; urethra; zygote; male urethra; zone of skin; skin of external ear; skin of back; embryo; More reference expression data
BioGPS	More reference expression data
Gene ontology
Molecular function	RNA polymerase II cis-regulatory region sequence-specific DNA binding; DNA-binding transcription factor activity; sequence-specific DNA binding; DNA binding; DNA-binding transcription activator activity, RNA polymerase II-specific; protein binding; DNA-binding transcription factor activity, RNA polymerase II-specific
Cellular component	nucleus
Biological process	regulation of transcription, DNA-templated; transcription, DNA-templated; positive regulation of transcription by RNA polymerase II; transcription by RNA polymerase II; regulation of transcription by RNA polymerase II; epidermis development
Sources:Amigo / QuickGO
Orthologs
Databases	NCBI: entry; OMA: entry
Species	Human	Mouse
Entrez	25833	18988
Ensembl	ENSG00000137709	ENSMUSG00000032015
UniProt	Q9UKI9	P31362
RefSeq (mRNA)	NM_001244682; NM_014352	NM_011139
RefSeq (protein)	NP_001231611; NP_055167	n/a
Location (UCSC)	Chr 11: 120.24 – 120.32 Mb	Chr 9: 43.04 – 43.12 Mb
PubMed search
- Wikidata
View/Edit Human	View/Edit Mouse

POU domain, class 2, transcription factor 3 is a protein that in humans is encoded by the POU2F3 gene.
