= HOXA2 =

Protein-coding gene in the species Homo sapiens

Identifiers
- Aliases: HOXA2, HOX1K, MCOHI, homeobox A2
- External IDs: OMIM: 604685; MGI: 96174; GeneCards: HOXA2

Gene location (Human)
Chr.	Chromosome 7 (human)
Band	7p15.2	Start	27,100,354 bp
Band	7p15.2	End	27,102,686 bp

Gene location (Mouse)
Chr.	Chromosome 6 (mouse)
Band	6 B3|6 25.4 cM	Start	52,139,397 bp
Band	6 B3|6 25.4 cM	End	52,141,811 bp
RNA expression pattern
Bgee	Human / Mouse (ortholog); Top expressed in: mucosa of transverse colon; Descending thoracic aorta; C1 segment; gastric mucosa; left uterine tube; ascending aorta; muscle layer of sigmoid colon; body of uterus; tibial arteries; rectum / Top expressed in: neuromere; rhombomere; tail of embryo; thoracic diaphragm; main bronchus; tongue; genital tubercle; female urethra; hair; ureter; More reference expression data
BioGPS	n/a
Gene ontology
Molecular function	DNA binding; sequence-specific DNA binding; DNA-binding transcription factor activity; RNA polymerase II cis-regulatory region sequence-specific DNA binding; DNA-binding transcription factor activity, RNA polymerase II-specific; DNA-binding transcription repressor activity, RNA polymerase II-specific
Cellular component	nucleus; intracellular membrane-bounded organelle
Biological process	regulation of transcription, DNA-templated; transcription, DNA-templated; multicellular organism development; negative regulation of transcription by RNA polymerase II; cell fate determination; osteoblast development; segment specification; pattern specification process; motor neuron axon guidance; anterior/posterior pattern specification; dorsal/ventral pattern formation; rhombomere 2 development; rhombomere 3 development; rhombomere 3 morphogenesis; brain segmentation; middle ear morphogenesis; cell fate commitment; negative regulation of neuron differentiation; negative regulation of osteoblast differentiation; positive regulation of transcription by RNA polymerase II; embryonic viscerocranium morphogenesis; embryonic skeletal system morphogenesis; cellular response to retinoic acid; regulation of transcription by RNA polymerase II
Sources:Amigo / QuickGO
Orthologs
Databases	NCBI: entry; OMA: entry
Species	Human	Mouse
Entrez	3199	15399
Ensembl	ENSG00000105996	ENSMUSG00000014704
UniProt	O43364	P31245
RefSeq (mRNA)	NM_006735	NM_010451
RefSeq (protein)	NP_006726	NP_034581
Location (UCSC)	Chr 7: 27.1 – 27.1 Mb	Chr 6: 52.14 – 52.14 Mb
PubMed search
- Wikidata
View/Edit Human	View/Edit Mouse

Homeobox protein Hox-A2 is a protein that in humans is encoded by the HOXA2 gene.

== Function ==
In vertebrates, the genes encoding the class of transcription factors called homeobox genes are found in clusters named A, B, C, and D on four separate chromosomes. Expression of these proteins is spatially and temporally regulated during embryonic development. This gene is part of the A cluster on chromosome 7 and encodes a DNA-binding transcription factor which may regulate gene expression, morphogenesis, and differentiation. The encoded protein may be involved in the placement of hindbrain segments in the proper location along the anterior-posterior axis during development. Two transcript variants encoding two different isoforms have been found for this gene, with only one of the isoforms containing the homeodomain region.

HOXA2 controls the embryonic development of the lower and middle part of the face and of the middle ear. Mutations in it are known to cause microtia, hearing impairment, and cleft palate.

== See also ==
- Homeobox
