= SIX2 =

Protein-coding gene in the species Homo sapiens

Identifiers
- Aliases: SIX2, SIX homeobox 2
- External IDs: OMIM: 604994; MGI: 102778; GeneCards: SIX2

Gene location (Human)
Chr.	Chromosome 2 (human)
Band	2p21	Start	45,005,182 bp
Band	2p21	End	45,009,452 bp

Gene location (Mouse)
Chr.	Chromosome 17 (mouse)
Band	17 E4|17 55.72 cM	Start	85,991,705 bp
Band	17 E4|17 55.72 cM	End	85,995,702 bp
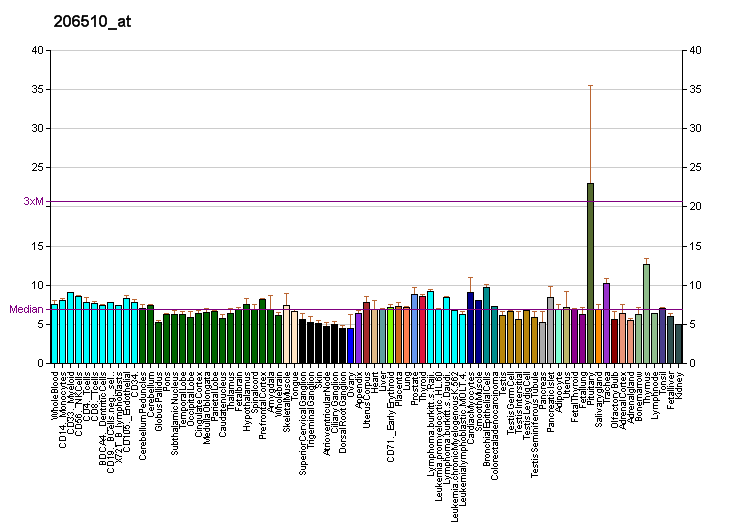

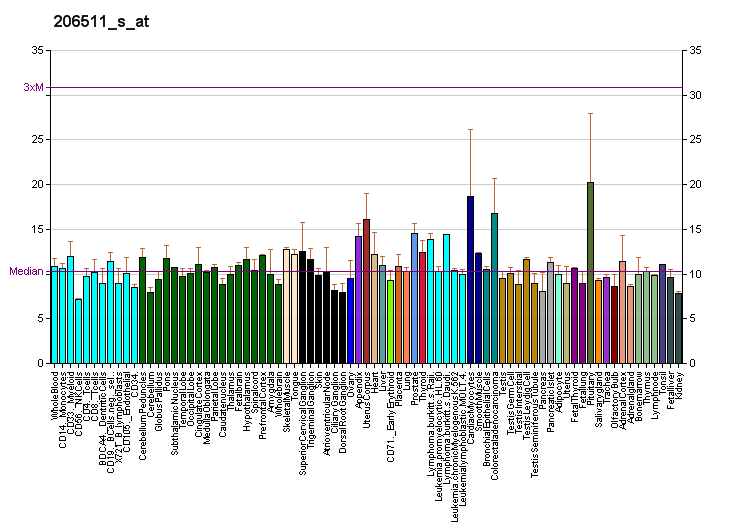
RNA expression pattern
Bgee	Human / Mouse (ortholog); Top expressed in: olfactory zone of nasal mucosa; gastrocnemius muscle; parotid gland; muscle of thigh; nasal epithelium; tendon of biceps brachii; testicle; tibialis anterior muscle; palpebral conjunctiva; pituitary gland / Top expressed in: genital tubercle; vestibular membrane of cochlear duct; maxillary prominence; parotid gland; external carotid artery; vestibular sensory epithelium; internal carotid artery; urethra; utricle; muscle of thigh; More reference expression data
BioGPS	More reference expression data
Gene ontology
Molecular function	DNA binding; sequence-specific DNA binding; DNA-binding transcription factor activity; DNA-binding transcription activator activity, RNA polymerase II-specific; transcription factor binding; RNA polymerase II cis-regulatory region sequence-specific DNA binding; protein-containing complex binding; DNA-binding transcription factor activity, RNA polymerase II-specific; transcription cis-regulatory region binding
Cellular component	nucleus; transcription regulator complex
Biological process	embryonic skeletal system morphogenesis; regulation of chondrocyte differentiation; regulation of transcription, DNA-templated; positive regulation of chondrocyte proliferation; chondrocyte differentiation; protein import into nucleus; kidney development; negative regulation of cell differentiation; anatomical structure morphogenesis; mesenchymal stem cell maintenance involved in nephron morphogenesis; mesenchymal to epithelial transition involved in metanephros morphogenesis; mesenchymal cell differentiation involved in kidney development; mesenchymal stem cell proliferation; transcription by RNA polymerase II; regulation of branching involved in ureteric bud morphogenesis; multicellular organism development; nephron morphogenesis; nephron development; middle ear morphogenesis; embryonic digestive tract morphogenesis; embryonic cranial skeleton morphogenesis; regulation of ossification; cell population proliferation; mesodermal cell fate specification; anterior/posterior axis specification; metanephros development; cell migration; positive regulation of transcription by RNA polymerase II; condensed mesenchymal cell proliferation; negative regulation of transcription, DNA-templated; anatomical structure development
Sources:Amigo / QuickGO
Orthologs
Databases	NCBI: entry; OMA: entry
Species	Human	Mouse
Entrez	10736	20472
Ensembl	ENSG00000170577	ENSMUSG00000024134
UniProt	Q9NPC8; Q8TBA2	Q62232
RefSeq (mRNA)	NM_016932	NM_011380
RefSeq (protein)	NP_058628; NP_058628.3	NP_035510
Location (UCSC)	Chr 2: 45.01 – 45.01 Mb	Chr 17: 85.99 – 86 Mb
PubMed search
- Wikidata
View/Edit Human	View/Edit Mouse

Homeobox protein SIX2 is a protein that in humans is encoded by the SIX2 gene.
