= MEIS2 =

Protein-coding gene in the species Homo sapiens

Identifiers
- Aliases: MEIS2, HsT18361, MRG1, Meis homeobox 2, CPCMR
- External IDs: OMIM: 601740; MGI: 108564; GeneCards: MEIS2
Available structures
PDB	Ortholog search: PDBe RCSB
PDB	List of PDB id codes 3K2A, 5BNG, 4XRM

Gene location (Human)
Chr.	Chromosome 15 (human)
Band	15q14	Start	36,889,204 bp
Band	15q14	End	37,101,299 bp

Gene location (Mouse)
Chr.	Chromosome 2 (mouse)
Band	2 E4- E5|2 58.28 cM	Start	115,693,545 bp
Band	2 E4- E5|2 58.28 cM	End	115,896,320 bp
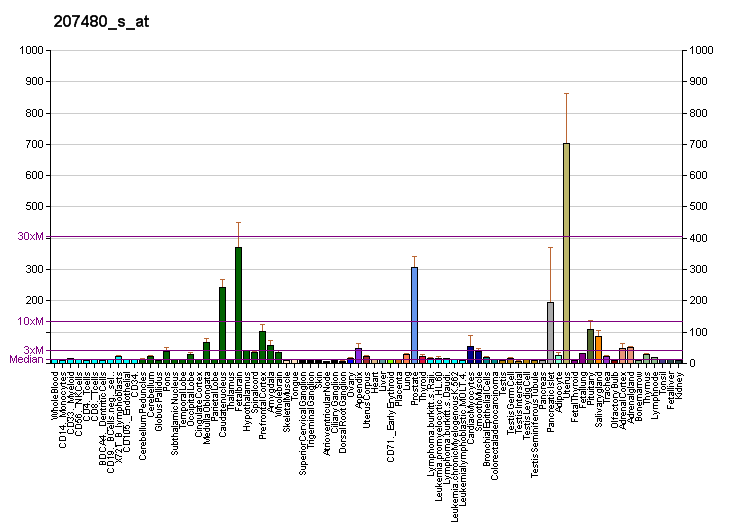
RNA expression pattern
Bgee	Human / Mouse (ortholog); Top expressed in: ventricular zone; ganglionic eminence; pancreatic ductal cell; parotid gland; palpebral conjunctiva; mucosa of paranasal sinus; tail of epididymis; external globus pallidus; parietal pleura; body of uterus / Top expressed in: Rostral migratory stream; vas deferens; dorsal striatum; genital tubercle; ventricular zone; ganglionic eminence; olfactory bulb; olfactory tubercle; medial ganglionic eminence; nucleus accumbens; More reference expression data
BioGPS	More reference expression data
Gene ontology
Molecular function	sequence-specific DNA binding; transcription corepressor activity; DNA-binding transcription factor activity; DNA-binding transcription activator activity, RNA polymerase II-specific; transcription factor binding; transcription coregulator activity; RNA polymerase II cis-regulatory region sequence-specific DNA binding; protein binding; DNA-binding transcription factor activity, RNA polymerase II-specific; DNA binding
Cellular component	cytoplasm; perinuclear region of cytoplasm; nucleus
Biological process	eye development; visual learning; regulation of transcription, DNA-templated; response to mechanical stimulus; negative regulation of transcription by RNA polymerase II; transcription by RNA polymerase II; transcription, DNA-templated; multicellular organism development; pancreas development; response to growth factor; negative regulation of myeloid cell differentiation; positive regulation of transcription by RNA polymerase II; positive regulation of mitotic cell cycle; positive regulation of cardiac muscle myoblast proliferation
Sources:Amigo / QuickGO
Orthologs
Databases	NCBI: entry; OMA: entry
Species	Human	Mouse
Entrez	4212	17536
Ensembl	ENSG00000134138	ENSMUSG00000027210
UniProt	O14770	P97367
RefSeq (mRNA)	NM_001220482; NM_002399; NM_020149; NM_170674; NM_170675 NM_170676; NM_170677; NM_172315; NM_172316	NM_001136072; NM_001159567; NM_001159568; NM_001159569; NM_001159570 NM_010825; NM_001346036; NM_001346038; NM_001346041; NM_001346044; NM_001346045; NM_001346047; NM_001346053; NM_001346055; NM_001346056
RefSeq (protein)	NP_001207411; NP_002390; NP_733774; NP_733775; NP_733776 NP_733777; NP_758526; NP_758527	NP_001129544; NP_001153039; NP_001153040; NP_001153041; NP_001153042 NP_001332965; NP_001332967; NP_001332970; NP_001332973; NP_001332974; NP_001332976; NP_001332982; NP_001332984; NP_001332985; NP_034955
Location (UCSC)	Chr 15: 36.89 – 37.1 Mb	Chr 2: 115.69 – 115.9 Mb
PubMed search
- Wikidata
View/Edit Human	View/Edit Mouse

Homeobox protein Meis2 is a protein that in humans is encoded by the MEIS2 gene.

This gene encodes a homeobox protein belonging to the TALE ('three amino acid loop extension') family of homeodomain-containing proteins. TALE homeobox proteins are highly conserved transcription regulators, and several members have been shown to be essential contributors to developmental programs. Multiple transcript variants encoding distinct isoforms have been described for this gene.
