= HOXD8 =

Protein-coding gene in the species Homo sapiens

Identifiers
- Aliases: HOXD8, HOX4, HOX4E, HOX5.4, homeobox D8
- External IDs: OMIM: 142985; MGI: 96209; GeneCards: HOXD8

Gene location (Human)
Chr.	Chromosome 2 (human)
Band	2q31.1	Start	176,129,694 bp
Band	2q31.1	End	176,132,695 bp

Gene location (Mouse)
Chr.	Chromosome 2 (mouse)
Band	2 C3|2 44.13 cM	Start	74,534,959 bp
Band	2 C3|2 44.13 cM	End	74,538,277 bp
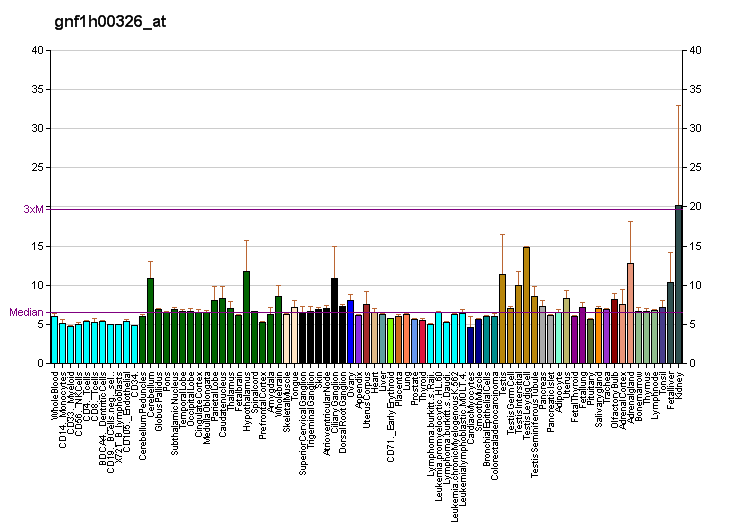
RNA expression pattern
Bgee	Human / Mouse (ortholog); Top expressed in: germinal epithelium; Achilles tendon; corpus epididymis; renal medulla; deltoid muscle; secondary oocyte; human kidney; body of uterus; muscle of thigh; left ovary / Top expressed in: tail of embryo; medullary collecting duct; right kidney; triceps brachii muscle; seminal vesicula; gastrocnemius muscle; human kidney; Gonadal ridge; medial head of gastrocnemius muscle; efferent ductule; More reference expression data
BioGPS	More reference expression data
Gene ontology
Molecular function	DNA-binding transcription factor activity; RNA polymerase II transcription regulatory region sequence-specific DNA binding; DNA binding; sequence-specific DNA binding; DNA-binding transcription activator activity, RNA polymerase II-specific; DNA-binding transcription factor activity, RNA polymerase II-specific
Cellular component	nucleus
Biological process	anterior/posterior pattern specification; multicellular organism development; anterior/posterior axis specification, embryo; regulation of transcription, DNA-templated; negative regulation of transcription by RNA polymerase II; positive regulation of transcription by RNA polymerase II; skeletal system morphogenesis; transcription, DNA-templated; transcription by RNA polymerase II
Sources:Amigo / QuickGO
Orthologs
Databases	NCBI: entry; OMA: entry
Species	Human	Mouse
Entrez	3234	15437
Ensembl	ENSG00000175879	ENSMUSG00000027102
UniProt	P13378	P23463
RefSeq (mRNA)	NM_019558; NM_001199746; NM_001199747	NM_001290730; NM_001290731; NM_008276
RefSeq (protein)	NP_001186675; NP_001186676; NP_062458	NP_001277659; NP_001277660; NP_032302
Location (UCSC)	Chr 2: 176.13 – 176.13 Mb	Chr 2: 74.53 – 74.54 Mb
PubMed search
- Wikidata
View/Edit Human	View/Edit Mouse

Homeobox protein Hox-D8 is a protein that in humans is encoded by the HOXD8 gene.

This gene belongs to the homeobox family of genes. The homeobox genes encode a highly conserved family of transcription factors that play an important role in morphogenesis in all multicellular organisms. Mammals possess four similar homeobox gene clusters, HOXA, HOXB, HOXC and HOXD, located on different chromosomes, consisting of 9 to 11 genes arranged in tandem. This gene is one of several homeobox HOXD genes located in a cluster on chromosome 2. Deletions that remove the entire HOXD gene cluster or the 5' end of this cluster have been associated with severe limb and genital abnormalities. In addition to effects during embryogenesis, this particular gene may also play a role in adult urogenital tract function.
