= RHOXF1 =

Protein-coding gene in the species Homo sapiens

Identifiers
- Aliases: RHOXF1, OTEX, PEPP1, Rhox homeobox family member 1
- External IDs: OMIM: 300446; GeneCards: RHOXF1

Gene location (Human)
Chr.	X chromosome (human)
Band	Xq24	Start	120,109,051 bp
Band	Xq24	End	120,115,913 bp
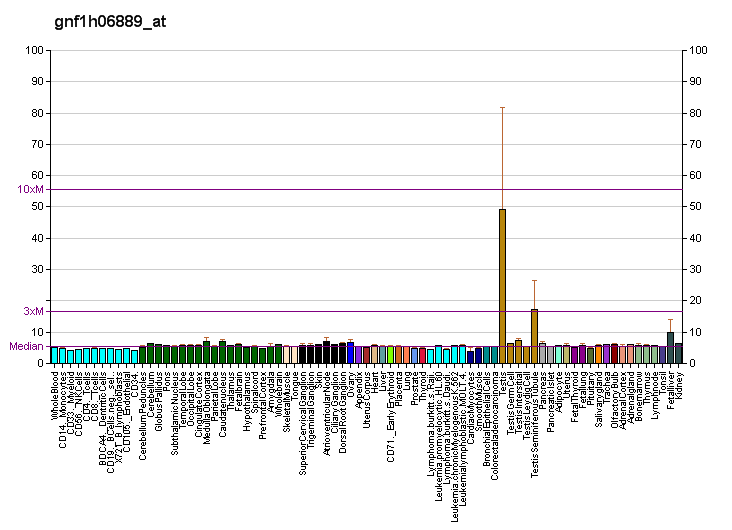
RNA expression pattern
Bgee	Human / Mouse (ortholog); Top expressed in: gonad; testicle; right testis; left testis; right hemisphere of cerebellum; right uterine tube; granulocyte; right ovary; right frontal lobe; left ovary / n/a; More reference expression data
BioGPS	More reference expression data
Gene ontology
Molecular function	DNA-binding transcription factor activity; DNA binding; sequence-specific DNA binding; DNA-binding transcription factor activity, RNA polymerase II-specific; RNA polymerase II transcription regulatory region sequence-specific DNA binding
Cellular component	nucleus
Biological process	multicellular organism development; gamete generation; regulation of transcription, DNA-templated; intracellular steroid hormone receptor signaling pathway; sexual reproduction; transcription, DNA-templated; positive regulation of gene expression; regulation of transcription by RNA polymerase II
Sources:Amigo / QuickGO
Orthologs
Databases	NCBI: entry; OMA: entry
Species	Human	Mouse
Entrez	158800	n/a
Ensembl	ENSG00000101883	n/a
UniProt	Q8NHV9	n/a
RefSeq (mRNA)	NM_139282	n/a
RefSeq (protein)	NP_644811	n/a
Location (UCSC)	Chr X: 120.11 – 120.12 Mb	n/a
PubMed search		n/a
- Wikidata
View/Edit Human

Rhox homeobox family member 1 is a protein that in humans is encoded by the RHOXF1 gene.
