= DBX1 =

Protein-coding gene in the species Homo sapiens

Identifiers
- Aliases: DBX1, developing brain homeobox 1, HLX1
- External IDs: MGI: 94867; GeneCards: DBX1

Gene location (Human)
Chr.	Chromosome 11 (human)
Band	11p15.1	Start	20,156,155 bp
Band	11p15.1	End	20,160,475 bp

Gene location (Mouse)
Chr.	Chromosome 7 (mouse)
Band	7 B4|7 31.44 cM	Start	49,281,247 bp
Band	7 B4|7 31.44 cM	End	49,286,597 bp
RNA expression pattern
Bgee	Human / Mouse (ortholog); Top expressed in: gonad; pituitary gland; right testis; left testis / Top expressed in: embryo; tongue; pineal gland; embryo; desmocranium; condyle; ventricular zone; dermis; basal plate; extraocular muscle; More reference expression data
BioGPS	n/a
Gene ontology
Molecular function	sequence-specific DNA binding; DNA binding; DNA-binding transcription factor activity, RNA polymerase II-specific
Cellular component	nucleus
Biological process	regulation of transcription by RNA polymerase II; multicellular organism development; ventral spinal cord interneuron specification; regulation of transcription, DNA-templated; cell differentiation in spinal cord
Sources:Amigo / QuickGO
Orthologs
Databases	NCBI: entry; OMA: entry
Species	Human	Mouse
Entrez	120237	13172
Ensembl	ENSG00000109851	ENSMUSG00000030507
UniProt	A6NMT0	P52950
RefSeq (mRNA)	NM_001029865	NM_001005232
RefSeq (protein)	NP_001025036	NP_001005232
Location (UCSC)	Chr 11: 20.16 – 20.16 Mb	Chr 7: 49.28 – 49.29 Mb
PubMed search
- Wikidata
View/Edit Human	View/Edit Mouse

Homeobox protein DBX1, also known as developing brain homeobox protein 1, is a protein that in humans is encoded by the DBX1 gene. The DBX1 gene is a transcription factor gene that is pivotal in interneuron differentiation in the ventral spinal cord.

The spinal interneurons V0 and V1 are derived from progenitor domains that are differentiated by the expression of homeodomain proteins DBX1 and DBX2. DBX1 is spatially restricted and has a critical role in establishing the distinction of V0 and V1 neuronal fate. In DBX1 mutant mice, neural progenitors fail to generate V0 interneurons and instead gave rise to interneurons expressing V1 characteristics, such as their transcription factor profile, neurotransmitter phenotype, migratory pattern, and aspects of their axonal trajectory, suggesting that this single homeodomain transcription factor coordinates many of the differentiated properties of one class of interneurons generated in the ventral spinal cord.

V0 and V1 interneurons are thought to be critical in the role of rhythmic breathing, after using a neonatal mouse model. Destruction of these DBX1 neurons in the pre-Botzinger complex showed an impaired respiratory rhythm as well as a decreased magnitude of motor output activity.
