= Hox gene =

Group of genes

Hox genes, a subset of homeobox genes, are a group of related genes that specify regions of the body plan of an embryo along the head-tail axis of animals. Hox proteins encode and specify the characteristics of 'position', ensuring that the correct structures form in the correct places of the body. For example, Hox genes in insects specify which appendages form on a segment (for example, legs, antennae, and wings in fruit flies), and Hox genes in vertebrates specify the types and shape of vertebrae that will form. In segmented animals, Hox proteins thus confer segmental or positional identity, but do not form the actual segments themselves.

Studies on Hox genes in ciliated larvae have shown they are only expressed in future adult tissues. In larvae with gradual metamorphosis the Hox genes are activated in tissues of the larval body, generally in the trunk region, that will be maintained through metamorphosis. In larvae with complete metamorphosis the Hox genes are mainly expressed in juvenile rudiments and are absent in the transient larval tissues. The larvae of the hemichordate species Schizocardium californicum and the pilidium larva of Nemertea do not express Hox genes.

An analogy for the Hox genes can be made to the role of a play director who calls which scene the actors should carry out next. If the play director calls the scenes in the wrong order, the overall play will be presented in the wrong order. Similarly, mutations in the Hox genes can result in body parts and limbs in the wrong place along the body. Like a play director, the Hox genes do not act in the play or participate in limb formation themselves.

The protein product of each Hox gene is a transcription factor. Each Hox gene contains a well-conserved DNA sequence known as the homeobox, of which the term "Hox" was originally a contraction. However, in current usage the term Hox is no longer equivalent to homeobox, because Hox genes are not the only genes to possess a homeobox sequence; for instance, humans have over 200 homeobox genes, of which 39 are Hox genes. Hox genes are thus a subset of the homeobox transcription factor genes. In many animals, the organization of the Hox genes in the chromosome is the same as the order of their expression along the anterior-posterior axis of the developing animal, and are thus said to display colinearity. Production of Hox gene products at wrong location in the body is associated with metaplasia and predisposes to oncological disease, e.g. Barrett's esophagus is the result of altered Hox coding and is a precursor to esophageal cancer.

== Producing Hox proteins ==
The products of Hox genes are Hox proteins. Hox proteins are a subset of transcription factors, which are proteins that are capable of binding to specific nucleotide sequences on DNA called enhancers through which they either activate or repress hundreds of other genes. The same Hox protein can act as a repressor at one gene and an activator at another. The ability of Hox proteins to bind DNA is conferred by a part of the protein referred to as the homeodomain. The homeodomain is a 60-amino-acid-long DNA-binding domain (encoded by its corresponding 180-base-pair DNA sequence, the homeobox). This amino acid sequence folds into a "helix-turn-helix" (i.e. homeodomain fold) motif that is stabilized by a third helix. The consensus polypeptide chain is shown below: Hox proteins often act in partnership with co-factors, such as PBC and Meis proteins encoded by very different types of homeobox gene.

            Helix 1          Helix 2         Helix 3/4
         ______________    __________    _________________
RRRKRTAYTRYQLLELEKEFLFNRYLTRRRRIELAHSLNLTERHIKIWFQNRRMKWKKEN
....|....|....|....|....|....|....|....|....|....|....|....|
         10        20        30        40        50        60

== Evolution ==
Expression of Hox genes in the body segments of different groups of arthropod. The Hox genes 7, 8, and 9 correspond in these groups but are shifted (by heterochrony) by up to three segments. Segments with maxillopeds have Hox gene 7. Fossil trilobites probably had three body regions, each with a unique combination of Hox genes.

Homeobox genes, and thus the homeodomain protein motif, are found in most eukaryotes. The Hox genes, being a subset of homeobox genes, arose more recently in evolution within the animal kingdom or Metazoa. Within the animal kingdom, Hox genes are present across the bilateria (animals with a clear head-to-tail axis), and have also been found in Cnidaria such as sea anemones. This implies that Hox genes arose over 550 million years ago. In bilateria, Hox genes are often arranged in gene clusters, although there are many exceptions where the genes have been separated by chromosomal rearrangements. Comparing homeodomain sequences between Hox proteins often reveals greater similarity between species than within a species; this observation led to the conclusion that Hox gene clusters evolved early in animal evolution from a single Hox gene via tandem duplication and subsequent divergence, and that a prototypic Hox gene cluster containing at least seven different Hox genes was present in the common ancestor of all bilaterian animals.

In most bilaterian animals, Hox genes are expressed in staggered domains along the head-to-tail axis of the embryo, suggesting that their role in specifying position is a shared, ancient feature. The functional conservation of Hox proteins can be demonstrated by the fact that a fly can function to a large degree with a chicken Hox protein in place of its own. So, despite having a last common ancestor that lived over 550 million years ago, the chicken and fly version of the same Hox gene are similar enough to target the same downstream genes in flies.

== Nomenclature ==
The fly Hox genes are named for the homeotic phenotypes that result when their function is disrupted, wherein one segment develops with the identity of another (e.g. legs where antennae should be). Hox genes in different phyla have been given different names, which has led to confusion about nomenclature. The complement of Hox genes in Drosophila is made up of two clusters, the Antennapedia complex and the Bithorax complex, which together were historically referred to as the HOM-C (for Homeotic Complex). Although historically HOM-C genes have referred to Drosophila homologues, while Hox genes referred to vertebrate homologues, this distinction is no longer made, and both HOM-C and Hox genes are called Hox genes.

== In Drosophila ==
Homeobox (Hox) gene expression in Drosophila melanogaster

Drosophila melanogaster is an important model organism for understanding body plan generation and evolution. The general principles of Hox gene function and logic elucidated in flies will apply to all bilaterian organisms, including humans. Drosophila, like all insects, has eight Hox genes. These are clustered into two complexes, both of which are located on chromosome 3. The Antennapedia complex (not to be confused with the Antp gene) consists of five genes: labial (lab), proboscipedia (pb), deformed (Dfd), sex combs reduced (Scr), and Antennapedia (Antp). The Bithorax complex, named after the Ultrabithorax gene, consists of the remaining three genes: Ultrabithorax (Ubx), abdominal-A (abd-A) and abdominal-B (abd-B).

=== Labial ===
The lab gene is the most anteriorly expressed gene. It is expressed in the head, primarily in the intercalary segment (an appendageless segment between the antenna and mandible), and also in the midgut. Loss of function of lab results in the failure of the Drosophila embryo to internalize the mouth and head structures that initially develop on the outside of its body (a process called head involution). Failure of head involution disrupts or deletes the salivary glands and pharynx. The lab gene was initially so named because it disrupted the labial appendage; however, the lab gene is not expressed in the labial segment, and the labial appendage phenotype is likely a result of the broad disorganization resulting from the failure of head involution.

=== Proboscipedia ===
The pb gene is responsible for the formation of the labial and maxillary palps. Some evidence shows pb interacts with Scr.

=== Deformed ===
The Dfd gene is responsible for the formation of the maxillary and mandibular segments in the larval head. The mutant phenotypes of Dfd are similar to those of labial. Loss of function of Dfd in the embryo results in a failure of head involution (see labial gene), with a loss of larval head structures. Mutations in the adult have either deletions of parts of the head or transformations of head to thoracic identity.

=== Sex combs reduced ===
The Scr gene is responsible for cephalic and thoracic development in Drosophila embryo and adult.

=== Antennapedia ===
The second thoracic segment, or T2, develops a pair of legs and a pair of wings. The Antp gene specifies this identity by promoting leg formation and allowing (but not directly activating) wing formation. A dominant Antp mutation, caused by a chromosomal inversion, causes Antp to be expressed in the antennal imaginal disc, so that, instead of forming an antenna, the disc makes a leg, resulting in a leg coming out of the fly's head.

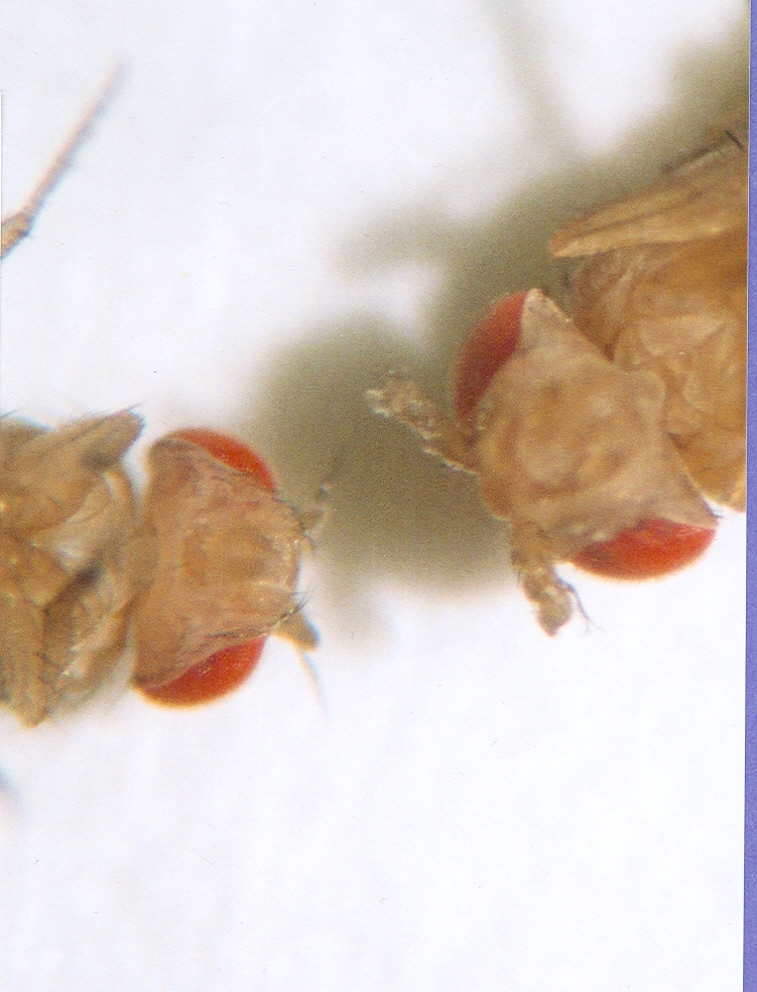
Wild type (left), Antennapedia mutant (right)

=== Ultrabithorax ===
The third thoracic segment, or T3, bears a pair of legs and a pair of halteres (highly reduced wings that function in balancing during flight). Ubx patterns T3 largely by repressing genes involved in wing formation. The wing blade is composed of two layers of cells that adhere tightly to one another, and are supplied with nutrient by several wing veins. One of the many genes that Ubx represses is blistered, which activates proteins involved in cell-cell adhesion, and spalt, which patterns the placement of wing veins. In Ubx loss-of-function mutants, Ubx no longer represses wing genes, and the halteres develop as a second pair of wings, resulting in the famous four-winged flies. When Ubx is misexpressed in the second thoracic segment, such as occurs in flies with the "Cbx" enhancer mutation, it represses wing genes, and the wings develop as halteres, resulting in a four-haltered fly.

=== Abdominal-A ===
In Drosophila, abd-A is expressed along most of the abdomen, from abdominal segments 1 (A1) to A8. Expression of abd-A is necessary to specify the identity of most of the abdominal segments. A major function of abd-A in insects is to repress limb formation. In abd-A loss-of-function mutants, abdominal segments A2 through A8 are transformed into an identity more like A1. When abd-A is ectopically expressed throughout the embryo, all segments anterior of A4 are transformed to an A4-like abdominal identity. The abd-A gene also affects the pattern of cuticle generation in the ectoderm, and pattern of muscle generation in the mesoderm.

=== Abdominal-B ===
Gene abd-B is transcribed in two different forms, a regulatory protein, and a morphogenic protein. Regulatory abd-B suppress embryonic ventral epidermal structures in the eighth and ninth segments of the Drosophila abdomen. Both the regulatory protein and the morphogenic protein are involved in the development of the tail segment.

== In other species ==
=== Classification of Hox proteins ===
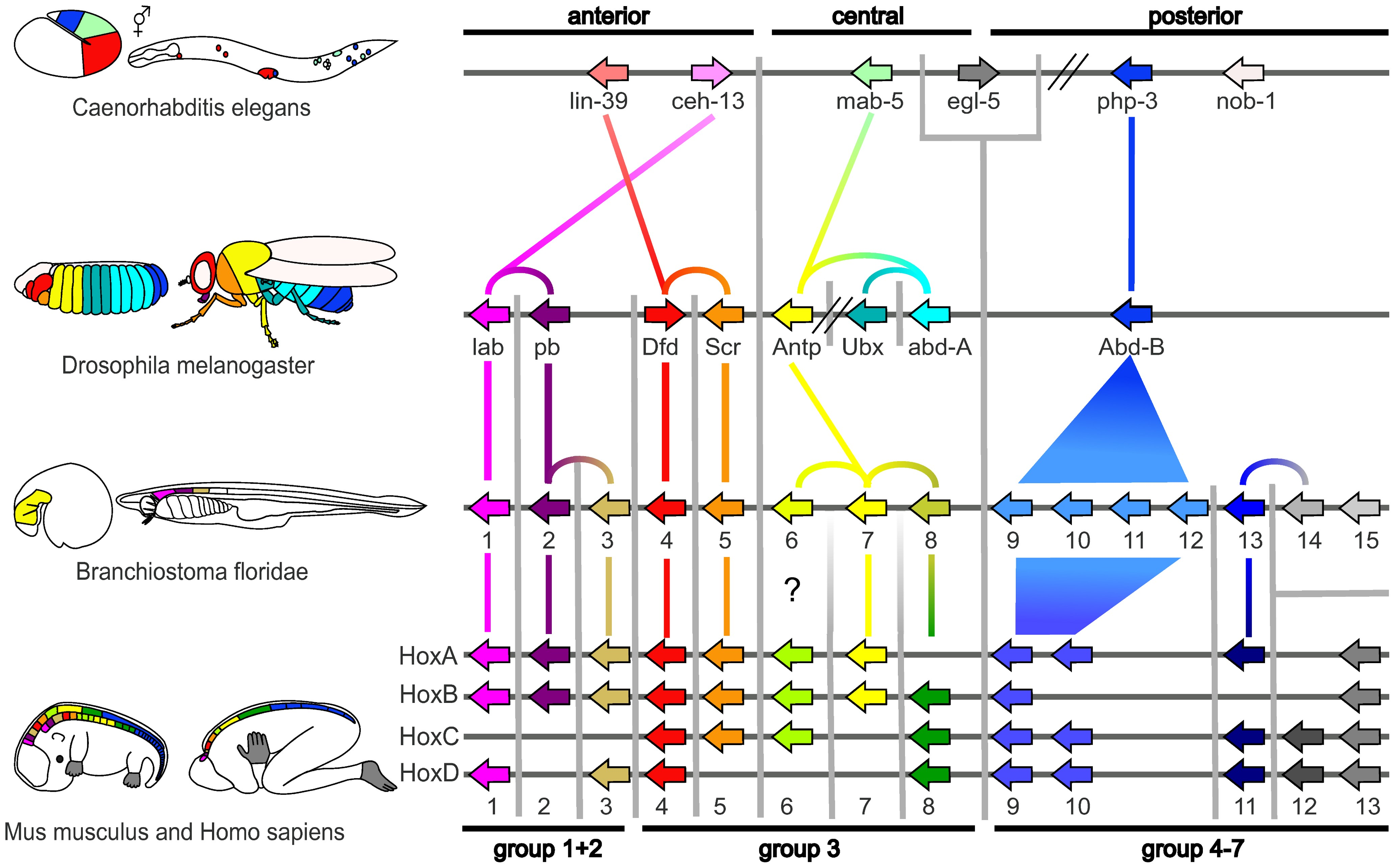
Hox genes in various species, using a sequence grouping.

Proteins with a high degree of sequence similarity are also generally assumed to exhibit a high degree of functional similarity, i.e. Hox proteins with identical homeodomains are assumed to have identical DNA-binding properties (unless additional sequences are known to influence DNA-binding). To identify the set of proteins between two different species that are most likely to be most similar in function, classification schemes are used.

For Hox proteins, three different classification schemes exist: phylogenetic inference based, synteny-based, and sequence similarity-based. The synteny method fails on C. elegans. The similarity method requires a little more data but is able to resolve all groups except the central (6,7,8) group. Phylogenetic interference on homeodomain sequences also does not fully resolve the central group.

Combining sequence similarity and the phylogenetic relationships of the animals allows for a more reasonable classification of the central group. From clustering sequences and plotting their occurrence onto a phylogenetic tree of the animal species, it appears that the ancestral bilaterian only had one type of central gene, most similar to modern Hox7 and Antp. All the other proteins were later innovations.

=== Vertebrates ===
Mice and humans have 39 Hox genes in four clusters:

Cluster	Human Chromosome	Genes
HOXA@	chromosome 7	HOXA1, HOXA2, HOXA3, HOXA4, HOXA5, HOXA6, HOXA7, HOXA9, HOXA10, HOXA11, HOXA13
HOXB@	chromosome 17	HOXB1, HOXB2, HOXB3, HOXB4, HOXB5, HOXB6, HOXB7, HOXB8, HOXB9, HOXB13
HOXC@	chromosome 12	HOXC4, HOXC5, HOXC6, HOXC8, HOXC9, HOXC10, HOXC11, HOXC12, HOXC13
HOXD@	chromosome 2	HOXD1, HOXD3, HOXD4, HOXD8, HOXD9, HOXD10, HOXD11, HOXD12, HOXD13

The ancestors of vertebrates had a single Hox gene cluster, which was duplicated (twice) early in vertebrate evolution by whole genome duplications to give four Hox gene clusters: Hoxa, Hoxb, Hoxc and Hoxd. It is currently unclear whether these duplications occurred before or after the divergence of lampreys and hagfish from other vertebrates. Most tetrapods have four HOX clusters, while most teleost fish, including zebrafish and medaka, have seven or eight Hox gene clusters because of an additional genome duplication which occurred in their evolutionary history. In zebrafish, one of the eight Hox gene clusters (a Hoxd cluster) has lost all protein-coding genes, and just a single microRNA gene marks the location of the original cluster. In some teleost fish, such as salmon, an even more recent genome duplication occurred, doubling the seven or eight Hox gene clusters to give at least 13 clusters. Another teleost, the freshwater butterflyfish, has instead seen a significant loss in HOX gene clusters, with only 5 clusters present.

Vertebrate bodies are not segmented in the same way as insects; they are on average much more complex, leading to more infrastructure in their body plan compared to insects. HOX genes control the regulation and development of many key structures in the body, such as somites, which form the vertebrae and ribs, the dermis of the dorsal skin, the skeletal muscles of the back, and the skeletal muscles of the body wall and limbs. HOX genes help differentiate somite cells into more specific identities and direct them to develop differently depending on where they are in the body. A large difference between vertebrates and invertebrates is the location and layering of HOX genes. The fundamental mechanisms of development are strongly conserved among vertebrates from fish to mammals.

Due to the fact that the HOX genes are so highly conserved, most research has been done on much simpler model organisms, such as mice. One of the major differences that was noticed when comparing mice and drosophila, in particular, has to do with the location and layering of HOX genes within the genome. Vertebrates do have HOX genes that are homologous to those of the fly as it is one of the most highly conserved genes, but the location is different. For example, there are more HOX genes on the 5' side of the mouse segment compared to the invertebrates. These genes correspond to expression in the tail, which would make sense as flies would not have anything similar to the tail that all vertebrates have. Additionally, in most vertebrates there are 39 members segregated into four separate tightly clustered gene arrays (A–D) on four separate chromosomes, whereas there are eight HOX genes in total for the Drosophila. Clusters are far more redundant and less likely to generate mutations. In flies, one gene can be mutated, resulting in a haltere, something fundamental for them to be able to fly, being transformed into a wing, or an antenna turning into a leg; in the mouse, two to four genes must be simultaneously removed to get a similar complete transformation. Some researchers believe that, because of the redundancy of the vertebrate HOX cluster plan and more constrained compared to invertebrate HOX clusters, the evolvability of vertebrate HOX clusters is, for some structural or functional reason, far lower than their invertebrate counterparts. This rapid evolvability is in part because invertebrates experienced much more dramatic episodes of adaptive radiation and mutations. More than 20 major clades of invertebrates differ so radically in body organization, partly due to a higher mutation rate, that they became formally classified as different phyla. All of the paralogous genes need to be knocked out in order for there to be any phenotypic changes for the most part. This is also one reason why homeotic mutations in vertebrates are so rarely seen.

In mouse embryos, the HOX10 genes, which is one of the genes that lie in the tail portion of the animal, turn the "rib-building" system off when the gene is activated. The genes are active in the lower back, where the vertebrae do not grow ribs, and inactive in the mid-back, allowing ribs to be formed. When the HOX10 paralogs are experimentally inactivated, the vertebrae of the lower back grow ribs. This research prompted an evolutionary search for these mutations among all animals. An example of this is in lizards and snakes. In snakes, HOX10 genes have lost their rib-blocking ability in that way.

=== Amphioxus ===
Amphioxus such as Branchiostoma floridae have a single Hox cluster with 15 genes, known as AmphiHox1 to AmphiHox15.

=== Other invertebrates ===
Six Hox genes are dispersed in the genome of Caenorhabditis elegans, a roundworm. Hydra and Nematostella vectensis, both in the phylum Cnidaria, have a few Hox/ParaHox-like homeobox genes.

Hox gene expression has also been studied in brachiopods, annelids, and a suite of molluscs.

== Regulated genes ==
Hox genes act at many levels within developmental gene hierarchies: at the "executive" level they regulate genes that in turn regulate large networks of other genes (like the gene pathway that forms an appendage). They also directly regulate what are called realisator genes or effector genes that act at the bottom of such hierarchies to ultimately form the tissues, structures, and organs of each segment. Segmentation involves such processes as morphogenesis (differentiation of precursor cells into their terminal specialized cells), the tight association of groups of cells with similar fates, the sculpting of structures and segment boundaries via programmed cell death, and the movement of cells from where they are first born to where they will ultimately function, so it is not surprising that the target genes of Hox genes promote cell division, cell adhesion, apoptosis, and cell migration.

Examples of target genes
Organism	Target gene	Normal function of target gene	Regulated by
Drosophila	distal-less	activates gene pathway for limb formation	ULTRABITHORAX (represses distal-less)
Drosophila	distal-less	activates gene pathway for limb formation	ABDOMINAL-A (represses distal-less)
Drosophila	decapentaplegic	triggers cell shape changes in the gut that are required for normal visceral morphology	ULTRABITHORAX (activates decapentaplegic)
Drosophila	reaper	Apoptosis: localized cell death creates the segmental boundary between the maxilla and mandible of the head	DEFORMED (activates reaper)
Drosophila	decapentaplegic	prevents the above cell changes in more posterior positions	ABDOMINAL-B (represses decapentaplegic)
Mouse	EphA7	Cell adhesion: causes tight association of cells in distal limb that will form digit, carpal and tarsal bones	HOX-A13 (activates EphA7)
Mouse	Cdkn1a	Cell cycle: differentiation of myelomonocyte cells into monocytes (white blood cells), with cell cycle arrest	Hox-A10 (activates Cdkn1a)

== Enhancer sequences bound by homeodomains ==
The DNA sequence bound by the homeodomain protein contains the nucleotide sequence TAAT, with the 5' terminal T being the most important for binding. This sequence is conserved in nearly all sites recognized by homeodomains, and probably distinguishes such locations as DNA binding sites. The base pairs following this initial sequence are used to distinguish between homeodomain proteins, all of which have similar recognition sites. For instance, the nucleotide following the TAAT sequence is recognized by the amino acid at position 9 of the homeodomain protein. In the maternal protein Bicoid, this position is occupied by lysine, which recognizes and binds to the nucleotide guanine. In Antennapedia, this position is occupied by glutamine, which recognizes and binds to adenine. If the lysine in Bicoid is replaced by glutamine, the resulting protein will recognize Antennapedia-binding enhancer sites.

However, all homeodomain-containing transcription factors bind essentially the same DNA sequence. The sequence bound by the homeodomain of a Hox protein is only six nucleotides long, and such a short sequence would be found at random many times throughout the genome, far more than the number of actual functional sites. Especially for Hox proteins, which produce such dramatic changes in morphology when misexpressed, this raises the question of how each transcription factor can produce such specific and different outcomes if they all bind the same sequence. One mechanism that introduces greater DNA sequence specificity to Hox proteins is to bind protein cofactors. Two such Hox cofactors are Extradenticle (Exd) and Homothorax (Hth). Exd and Hth bind to Hox proteins and appear to induce conformational changes in the Hox protein that increase its specificity.

== Regulation of Hox genes ==
Just as Hox genes regulate realisator genes, they are in turn regulated themselves by other genes. In Drosophila and some insects (but not most animals), Hox genes are regulated by gap genes and pair-rule genes, which are in their turn regulated by maternally-supplied mRNA. This results in a transcription factor cascade: maternal factors activate gap or pair-rule genes; gap and pair-rule genes activate Hox genes; then, finally, Hox genes activate realisator genes that cause the segments in the developing embryo to differentiate.

Regulation is achieved via protein concentration gradients, called morphogenic fields. For example, high concentrations of one maternal protein and low concentrations of others will turn on a specific set of gap or pair-rule genes. In flies, stripe 2 in the embryo is activated by the maternal proteins Bicoid and Hunchback, but repressed by the gap proteins Giant and Kruppel. Thus, stripe 2 will only form wherever there is Bicoid and Hunchback, but not where there is Giant and Kruppel.

MicroRNA strands located in Hox clusters have been shown to inhibit more anterior hox genes ("posterior prevalence phenomenon"), possibly to better fine tune its expression pattern.

Non-coding RNA (ncRNA) has been shown to be abundant in Hox clusters. In humans, 231 ncRNA may be present. One of these, HOTAIR, silences in trans (it is transcribed from the HOXC cluster and inhibits late HOXD genes) by binding to Polycomb-group proteins (PRC2).

The chromatin structure is essential for transcription but it also requires the cluster to loop out of the chromosome territory.

In higher animals including humans, retinoic acid regulates differential expression of Hox genes along the anteroposterior axis. Genes in the 3' ends of Hox clusters are induced by retinoic acid resulting in expression domains that extend more anteriorly in the body compared to 5' Hox genes that are not induced by retinoic acid resulting in expression domains that remain more posterior.

Quantitative PCR has shown several trends regarding colinearity: the system is in equilibrium and the total number of transcripts depends on the number of genes present according to a linear relationship.

== Colinearity ==
In some organisms, especially vertebrates, the various Hox genes are situated very close to one another on the chromosome in groups or clusters. The order of the genes on the chromosome is the same as the expression of the genes in the developing embryo, with the first gene being expressed in the anterior end of the developing organism. The reason for this colinearity is not yet completely understood, but could be related to the activation of Hox genes in a temporal sequence by gradual unpacking of chromatin along a gene cluster.

== History ==
The Hox genes are so named because mutations in them cause homeotic transformations. Homeotic transformations were first identified and studied by William Bateson in 1894, who coined the term "homeosis". After the rediscovery of Mendel's genetic principles, Bateson and others realized that some examples of homeosis in floral organs and animal skeletons could be attributed to variation in genes.

Definitive evidence for a genetic basis of some homeotic transformations was obtained by isolating homeotic mutants. The first homeotic mutant was found by Calvin Bridges in Thomas Hunt Morgan's laboratory in 1915. This mutant shows a partial duplication of the thorax and was therefore named Bithorax (bx). It transforms the third thoracic segment (T3) toward the second (T2). Bithorax arose spontaneously in the laboratory and has been maintained continuously as a laboratory stock ever since.

The genetic studies by Morgan and others provided the foundation for the systematic analyses of Edward B. Lewis and Thomas Kaufman, which provided preliminary definitions of the many homeotic genes of the Bithorax and Antennapedia complexes, and also showed that the mutant phenotypes for most of these genes could be traced back to patterning defects in the embryonic body plan.

Ed Lewis, Christiane Nüsslein-Volhard and Eric F. Wieschaus identified and classified 15 genes of key importance in determining the body plan and the formation of body segments of the fruit fly D. melanogaster in 1980. For their work, Lewis, Nüsslein-Volhard, and Wieschaus were awarded the Nobel Prize in Physiology or Medicine in 1995.

In 1983, the homeobox was discovered independently by researchers in two labs: Ernst Hafen, Michael Levine, and William McGinnis (in Walter Gehring's lab at the University of Basel, Switzerland) and Matthew P. Scott and Amy Weiner (in Thomas Kaufman's lab at Indiana University in Bloomington).

== Research ==
Hox genes play critical roles in the development of structures such as limbs, lungs, the nervous system, and eyes. As T. R. Lappin and colleagues observed in 2006, "Evolutionary conservation provides unlimited scope for experimental investigation of the functional control of the Hox gene network which is providing important insights into human disease." In the future, more research can be done in investigating the roles of Hox genes in leukaemia and cancer (such as EOC).

== See also ==
- Discredited hypotheses for the Cambrian explosion (Section: Regulatory genes)
- Homeobox
- Homeotic gene
- Hox genes in amphibians and reptiles
- Morphogenesis
