= Thomas Kaufman =

American geneticist

- Born: United States
- Education: California State University (BS), University of Texas (PhD), University of British Columbia (Postdoctoral Fellowship)
- Known for: Chromatin, Chromosomes, Genome integrity, developmental mechanisms and regulation in eukaryotic systems, eukaryotic cell biology.
- Awards: National Academy of Science, Genetics Society of America (president), Drosophila Genome Project, American Association for the Advancement of Science, National Drosophila Board, Distinguished Professor at University of Indiana, Conklin Medalist Award, American Academy of Arts and Sciences, George W. Beadle Medal Award.
- Scientific career
- Fields: Genetics
- Institutions: Indiana University

Thomas Charles Kaufman is an American geneticist. He is known for his work on the zeste-white region of the Drosophila X chromosome. He is currently a distinguished professor of biology at Indiana University, where he conducts his current research on Homeotic Genes in evolution and development.

== Early life and education ==
Kaufman enrolled in California State University at Northridge in 1962. There he joined the laboratory of George Lefevre. This inspired Kaufman to pursue a career in genetics and to use the Drosophila as his model system of choice. Kaufman attained his PhD from the University of Texas in 1970. While there he did his graduate work with Burke Judd. His work focused on saturation mutagenesis as well as the developmental genetics of the Zeste- White region of the Drosophila X Chromosome. This research became a classic study in genetics. The purpose was to test the “one gene – one band” hypothesis. Their results helped to estimate the size of the Drosophila genome long before gene sequencing was a thing. Kaufman went on to join David Suzuki’s group at the University of British Columbia. He served as a postdoctoral associate, and their research involved temperature sensitive mutations.

== Research and career ==
After one year of research with David Suzuki, Kaufman became an individual researcher in Vancouver. During this time, Kaufman began his collaboration with Rob Denell that focused on a set of mutations that caused dominant defects in the fly’s head and anterior thorax. In 1983, Kaufman became an associate professor at Indiana University, where he remains. It was during this time that Kaufman defined the antennapedia gene complex. He discovered that this cluster of genes controlled the anterior segments in the embryo and adults. Kaufman broadened his work to examine the HOX gene (homeotic gene clusters) in insects. Kaufman went on to found and design FlyBase, which is a database that organizes data on the Drosophila. Kaufman also helped to establish the Bloomington Drosophila Stick Center and the Drosophila Genomics Resource Center. Kaufman's current research still heavily involves the HOX gene. He is currently interested in proteome changes in the head of the aging Drosophila. In his personal statement for the National Academy of Sciences he states that "The goal of my laboratory is to contribute to an understanding of the genetic regulation development of higher organisms. The homeotic (Hox) genes of Drosophila melanogaster have been our principal focus. Homeotic lesions cause one portion of the animal to be transformed into an identity normally found elsewhere. The role of the Hox genes is best viewed as a set of developmental switches for decisions of segmental fate. The encoded homeodomain has shown that this switch activity is carried out through the transcriptional regulation of target genes." He has expanded his research from Drosophila to include several other insects and members of other subphylums under the phylum Arthopoda, such as Crustacea, Chelicerata and Myriapoda. He uses the technique of RNA-mediated gene inhibition (RNAi) to study the evolution of the HOX gene.

== Awards and honors ==
- 2010- , Chairman, National Drosophila Board
- 2008, Member, National Academy of Science
- 2007, Member, American Association for the Advancement of Science
- 2005, George W. Beadle Medal
- 1999, Member, Fellow of the American Academy of Arts and Sciences
- 1998, Conklin Medalist
- 1993, Distinguished professor of biology at Indiana University
- Member, Genetics Society of America
- Member, Drosophila Genome Project
