= HOXB3 =

Protein-coding gene in the species Homo sapiens

Identifiers
- Aliases: HOXB3, HOX2, HOX2G, Hox-2.7, homeobox B3
- External IDs: OMIM: 142966; MGI: 96184; GeneCards: HOXB3

Gene location (Human)
Chr.	Chromosome 17 (human)
Band	17q21.32	Start	48,548,870 bp
Band	17q21.32	End	48,604,912 bp

Gene location (Mouse)
Chr.	Chromosome 11 (mouse)
Band	11 D|11 59.84 cM	Start	96,214,152 bp
Band	11 D|11 59.84 cM	End	96,238,756 bp
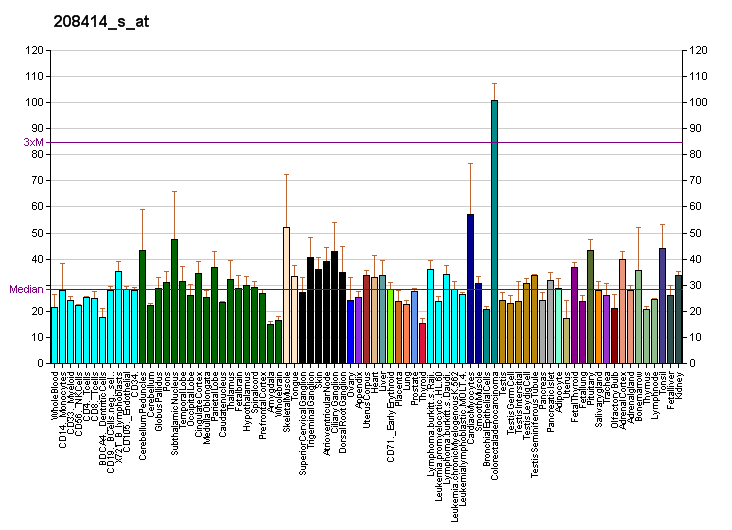
RNA expression pattern
Bgee	Human / Mouse (ortholog); Top expressed in: right uterine tube; corpus epididymis; caput epididymis; seminal vesicula; gastric mucosa; muscle layer of sigmoid colon; tail of epididymis; transverse colon; beta cell; endometrium / Top expressed in: efferent ductule; migratory enteric neural crest cell; tail of embryo; vas deferens; medullary collecting duct; inferior ganglion of vagus nerve; hair follicle; abdominal wall; Paneth cell; thoracic vertebral column; More reference expression data
BioGPS	More reference expression data
Gene ontology
Molecular function	DNA-binding transcription factor activity; DNA binding; sequence-specific DNA binding; DNA-binding transcription activator activity, RNA polymerase II-specific; RNA polymerase II cis-regulatory region sequence-specific DNA binding; DNA-binding transcription factor activity, RNA polymerase II-specific
Cellular component	nucleus
Biological process	embryonic skeletal system morphogenesis; multicellular organism development; glossopharyngeal nerve morphogenesis; definitive hemopoiesis; thyroid gland development; cartilage development; face development; regulation of transcription, DNA-templated; negative regulation of transcription by RNA polymerase II; regulation of neurogenesis; rhombomere development; angiogenesis; hematopoietic progenitor cell differentiation; transcription, DNA-templated; anterior/posterior pattern specification; positive regulation of transcription by RNA polymerase II; transcription by RNA polymerase II
Sources:Amigo / QuickGO
Orthologs
Databases	NCBI: entry; OMA: entry
Species	Human	Mouse
Entrez	3213	15410
Ensembl	ENSG00000120093	ENSMUSG00000048763
UniProt	P14651	P09026
RefSeq (mRNA)	NM_002146; NM_001330322; NM_001330323; NM_001384747; NM_001384749 NM_001384750	NM_001079869; NM_010458
RefSeq (protein)	NP_001317251; NP_001317252; NP_002137	NP_001073338; NP_034588
Location (UCSC)	Chr 17: 48.55 – 48.6 Mb	Chr 11: 96.21 – 96.24 Mb
PubMed search
- Wikidata
View/Edit Human	View/Edit Mouse

Homeobox protein Hox-B3 is a protein that in humans is encoded by the HOXB3 gene.

This gene is a member of the Antp homeobox family and encodes a nuclear protein with a homeobox DNA-binding domain. It is included in a cluster of homeobox B genes located on chromosome 17. The encoded protein functions as a sequence-specific transcription factor that is involved in development. Increased expression of this gene is associated with a distinct biologic subset of acute myeloid leukemia (AML).

== See also ==
- Homeobox
