= HOXB2 =

Protein-coding gene in humans

Identifiers
- Aliases: HOXB2, HOX2, HOX2H, Hox-2.8, K8, homeobox B2
- External IDs: OMIM: 142967; MGI: 96183; GeneCards: HOXB2

Gene location (Human)
| Chr. | Chromosome 17 (human) |
| Band | 17q21.32 | Start | 48,540,894 bp |
| Band | 17q21.32 | End | 48,545,109 bp |

Gene location (Mouse)
| Chr. | Chromosome 11 (mouse) |
| Band | 11 D|11 59.85 cM | Start | 96,241,351 bp |
| Band | 11 D|11 59.85 cM | End | 96,244,838 bp |
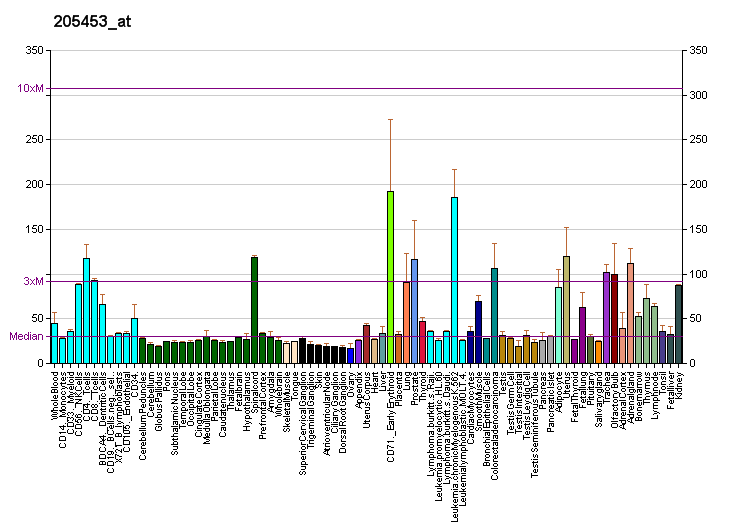
RNA expression pattern
| Bgee | Human / Mouse (ortholog); Top expressed in: seminal vesicula; right uterine tube; corpus epididymis; muscle layer of sigmoid colon; caput epididymis; left coronary artery; gastric mucosa; Descending thoracic aorta; right coronary artery; canal of the cervix / Top expressed in: embryo; somite; tail of embryo; transitional epithelium of urinary bladder; seminal vesicula; proximal tubule; adrenal gland; right kidney; enteric nervous system; medullary collecting duct; More reference expression data |
| BioGPS | More reference expression data |
Gene ontology
| Molecular function | DNA-binding transcription factor activity; DNA binding; DNA-binding transcription activator activity, RNA polymerase II-specific; sequence-specific DNA binding; DNA-binding transcription factor activity, RNA polymerase II-specific; RNA polymerase II cis-regulatory region sequence-specific DNA binding |
| Cellular component | nucleus; nucleoplasm; cytosol; nuclear speck |
| Biological process | multicellular organism development; regulation of transcription, DNA-templated; blood circulation; transcription, DNA-templated; morphogenesis of an epithelial sheet; anterior/posterior pattern specification; dorsal/ventral pattern formation; rhombomere 3 development; rhombomere 4 development; facial nerve structural organization; embryonic skeletal system morphogenesis; skeletal system morphogenesis; neural nucleus development; transcription by RNA polymerase II; positive regulation of transcription by RNA polymerase II |
Sources:Amigo / QuickGO
Orthologs
| Databases | NCBI: entry; OMA: entry |
| Species | Human | Mouse |
| Entrez | 3212 | 103889 |
| Ensembl | ENSG00000173917 | ENSMUSG00000075588 |
| UniProt | P14652 | P0C1T1 |
| RefSeq (mRNA) | NM_002145 | NM_134032 |
| RefSeq (protein) | NP_002136 | NP_598793 |
| Location (UCSC) | Chr 17: 48.54 – 48.55 Mb | Chr 11: 96.24 – 96.24 Mb |
| PubMed search |
- Wikidata
| View/Edit Human | View/Edit Mouse |

Homeobox protein Hox-B2 is a protein that in humans is encoded by the HOXB2 gene.

== Function ==
This gene is a member of the Antp homeobox family and encodes a nuclear protein with a homeobox DNA-binding domain. It is included in a cluster of homeobox B genes located on chromosome 17. The encoded protein functions as a sequence-specific transcription factor that is involved in development. Increased expression of this gene is associated with pancreatic cancer.

== See also ==
- Homeobox
