= Imaginal disc =

One of the parts of a holometabolous insect larva

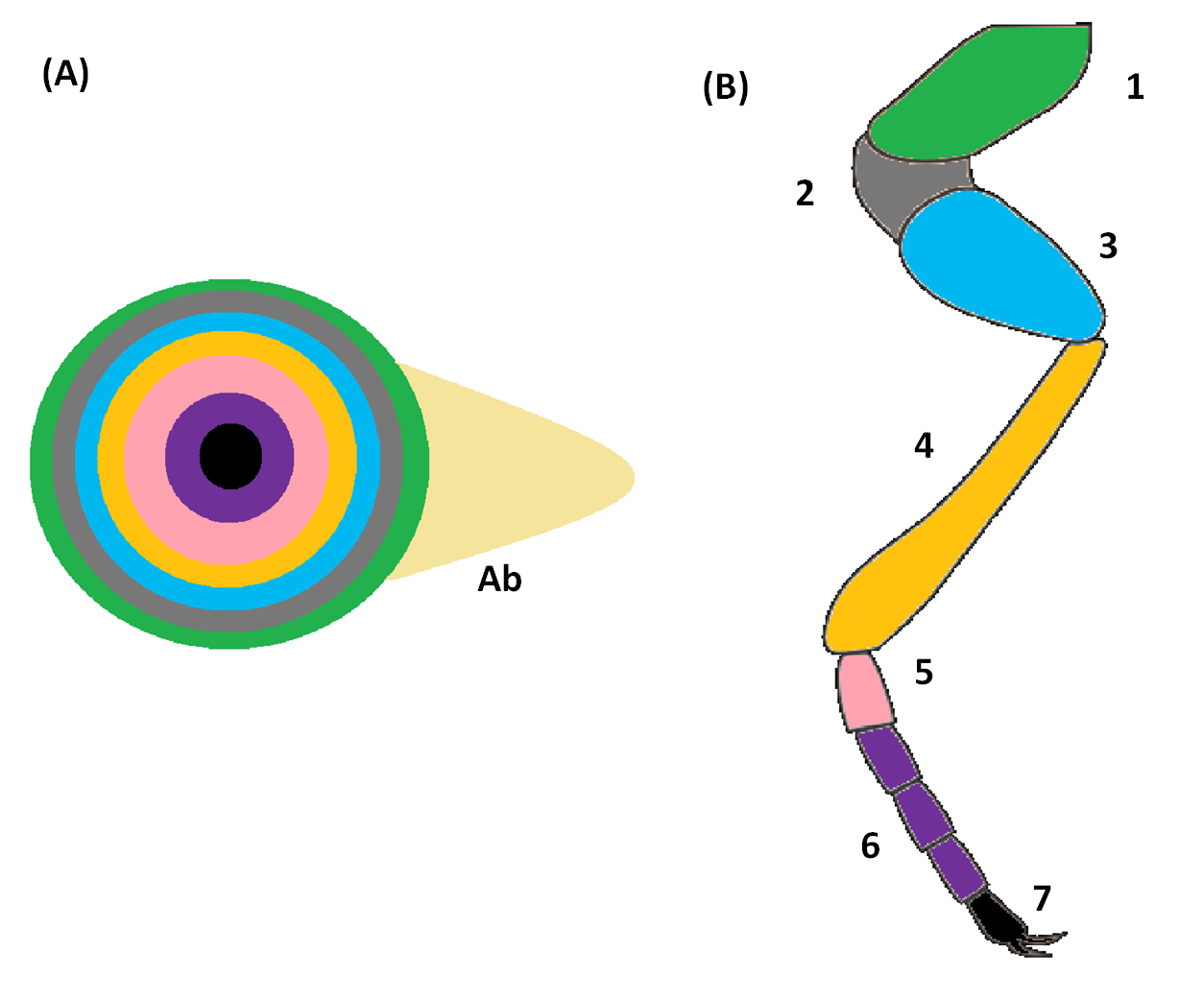
- Destination of the imaginal disc in the leg of an insect.

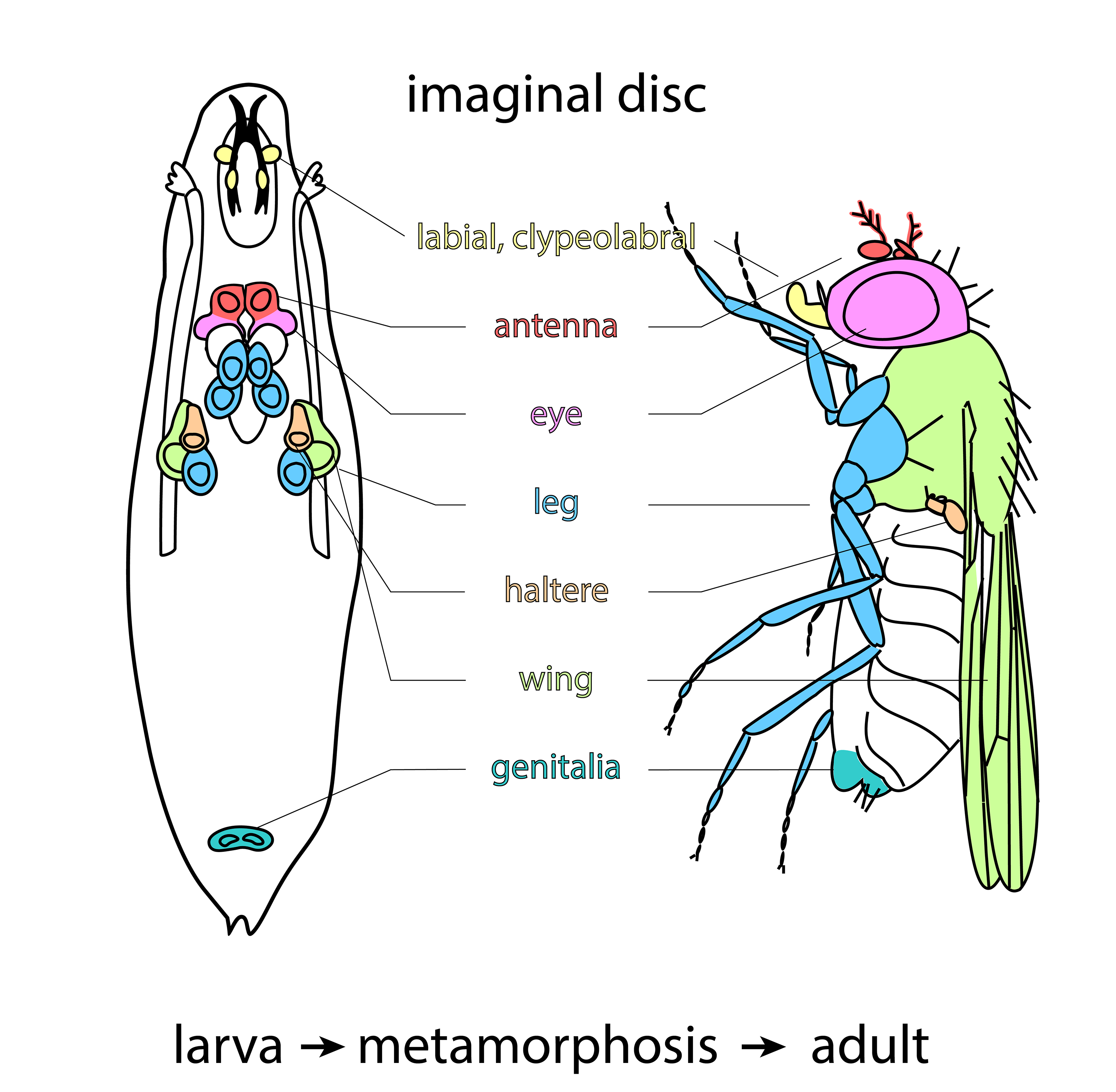
During metamorphosis, imaginal discs of the larva develop into adult fly structures.

An imaginal disc is one of the parts of a holometabolous insect larva that will become a portion of the outside of the adult insect during the pupal transformation to the imago. Contained within the body of the larva, there are pairs of discs that will form, for instance, the wings or legs or antennae or other structures in the adult. The role of the imaginal disc in insect development was first elucidated by Jan Swammerdam.

During the pupal stage, many larval structures are broken down, and adult structures, including the discs, undergo rapid development. Each disc everts and elongates, with the central portion of the disc becoming the distal part of whichever appendage it is forming: the wing, leg, antenna, etc. During the larval stage, the cells in the growing disc appear undifferentiated, but their developmental fate in the adult is already determined.

The experiment that demonstrates this developmental commitment is to take an imaginal disc from a third instar larva, about to undergo pupation, and subdivide it and culture it in the body of a younger larva. Discs can be continuously cultured this way for many larval generations. When such a cultured disc is eventually implanted in the body of a larva that is allowed to pupate, the disc will develop into the structure it was originally determined to become. That is, an antenna disc can be cultured this way and will, almost always, become an antenna (out of place, of course) when final development is triggered by pupation.

The study of imaginal discs in the fruit fly Drosophila melanogaster led to the discovery of homeotic mutations such as antennapedia, where the developmental fate of a disc could sometimes change. It is of interest to entomologists that the kinds of developmental switches that occur are very specific (leg to antenna, for instance). Study of this phenomenon led to the discovery of the homeobox genes, and started a revolution in the understanding of development in multi-celled animals.

== Imaginal cells ==
Imaginal cells are tissue-specific progenitors allocated in embryogenesis that remain quiescent during embryonic and larval life. During Drosophila metamorphosis, most larval cells die. Pupal and adult tissues form from imaginal cells. Clonal analysis and fate mapping of single, identified cells show that tracheal system remodeling at metamorphosis involves a classical imaginal cell population and a population of differentiated, functional larval tracheal cells that reenter the cell cycle and regain developmental potency. In late larvae, both populations are activated and proliferate, spread over and replace old branches, and diversify into various stalk and coiled tracheolar cells under control of fibroblast growth factor signaling. Thus, Drosophila pupal/adult tissue progenitors can arise both by early allocation of multipotent cells and late return of differentiated cells to a multipotent state, even within a single tissue.
