= Hox genes in amphibians and reptiles =

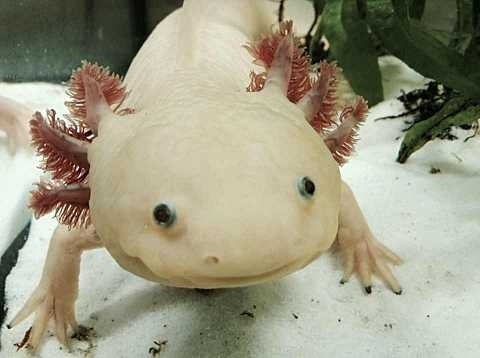
A captive axolotl (Ambystoma mexicanum)

Hox genes play a massive role in some amphibians and reptiles in their ability to regenerate lost limbs, especially HoxA and HoxD genes.

If the processes involved in forming new tissue can be reverse-engineered into humans, it may be possible to heal injuries of the spinal cord or brain, repair damaged organs and reduce scarring and fibrosis after surgery. Despite the large conservation of the Hox genes through evolution, mammals and humans specifically cannot regenerate any of their limbs. This raises a question as to why humans which also possess an analog to these genes cannot regrow and regenerate limbs. Beside the lack of specific growth factor, studies have shown that something as small as base pair differences between amphibian and human Hox analogs play a crucial role in human inability to reproduce limbs. Undifferentiated stem cells and the ability to have polarity in tissues is vital to this process.

== Overview ==
Some amphibians and reptiles have the ability to regenerate limbs, eyes, spinal cords, hearts, intestines, and upper and lower jaws. The Japanese fire belly newt can regenerate its eye lens 18 times over a period of 16 years and retain its structural and functional properties. The cells at the site of the injury have the ability to undifferentiate, reproduce rapidly, and differentiate again to create a new limb or organ.

Hox genes are a group of related genes that control the body plan of an embryo along the head-tail axis. They are responsible for body segment differentiation and express the arrangement of numerous body components during initial embryonic development. Primarily, these sets of genes are utilized during the development of body plans by coding for the transcription factors that trigger production of body segment specific structures. Additionally in most animals, these genes are laid out along the chromosome similar to the order in which they are expressed along the anterior–posterior axis.

Variants of the Hox genes are found almost in every phylum with the exception of the sponge which use a different type of developmental genes. The homology of these genes is of important interest to scientists as they may hold more answers to the evolution of many species. In fact, these genes demonstrate such a high degree of homology that a human Hox gene variant – HOXB4 – could mimic the function of its homolog in the fruit fly (Drosophila). Studies suggest that the regulation and other target genes in different species are actually what causes such a great difference in phenotypic difference between species.

Hox genes contain a DNA sequence known as the homeobox that are involved in the regulation of patterns of anatomical development. They contain a specific DNA sequence with the aim of providing instructions for making a string of 60 protein building blocks - amino acids- which are referred to as the homeodomain. Most homeodomain-containing proteins function as transcription factors and fundamentally bind and regulate the activity of different genes. The homeodomain is the segment of the protein that binds to precise regulatory regions of the target genes. Genes within the homeobox family are implicated in a wide variety of significant activities during growth. These activities include directing the development of limbs and organs along the anterior-posterior axis and regulating the process by which cells mature to carry out specific functions, a process known as cellular differentiation. Certain homeobox genes can act tumor suppressors, which means they help prevent cells from growing and dividing too rapidly or in an uncontrolled way.

Due to the fact that homeobox genes have so many important functions, mutations in these genes are accountable for a wide array of developmental disorders. Changes in certain homeobox genes often result in eye disorders, cause abnormal head, face, and tooth development. Additionally, increased or decreased activity of certain homeobox genes has been associated with several forms of cancer later in life.

== Limb development ==
Essentially, Hox genes contribute to the specification of three main components of limb development, including the stylopod, zeugopod and autopod. Certain mutations in Hox genes can potentially lead to the proximal and/or distal losses along with different abnormalities. Three different models have been created for outlining the patterning of these regions. The Zone of polarizing activity (ZPA) in the limb bud has pattern-organizing activity through the utilization of a morphogen gradient of a protein called Sonic hedgehog (Shh). Sonic hedgehog is turned on in the posterior region via the early expression of HoxD genes, along with the expression of Hoxb8. Shh is maintained in the posterior through a feedback loop between the ZPA and the AER. Shh cleaves the Ci/Gli3 transcriptional repressor complex to convert the transcription factor Gli3 to an activator, which activates the transcription of HoxD genes along the anterior/posterior axis. It is evident that different Hox genes are critical for proper limb development in different amphibians.

Researchers conducted a study targeting the Hox-9 to Hox-13 genes in different species of frogs and other amphibians. Similar to an ancient tetrapod group with assorted limb types, amphibians are required for the understanding of the origin and diversification of limbs in different land vertebrates. A PCR (Polymerase Chain Reaction) study was conducted in two species of each amphibian order to identify Hox-9 to Hox-13. Fifteen distinct posterior Hox genes and one retro-pseudogene were identified, and the former confirm the existence of four Hox clusters in each amphibian order. Certain genes expected to occur in all tetrapods, based on the posterior Hox complement of mammals, fishes and coelacanth, were not recovered. HoxD-12 is absent in frogs and possibly other amphibians. By definition, the autopodium is distal segment of a limb, comprising the hand or foot. Considering Hox-12’s function in autopodium development, the loss of this gene may be related to the absence of the fifth finger in frogs and salamanders.

== Hox clusters ==
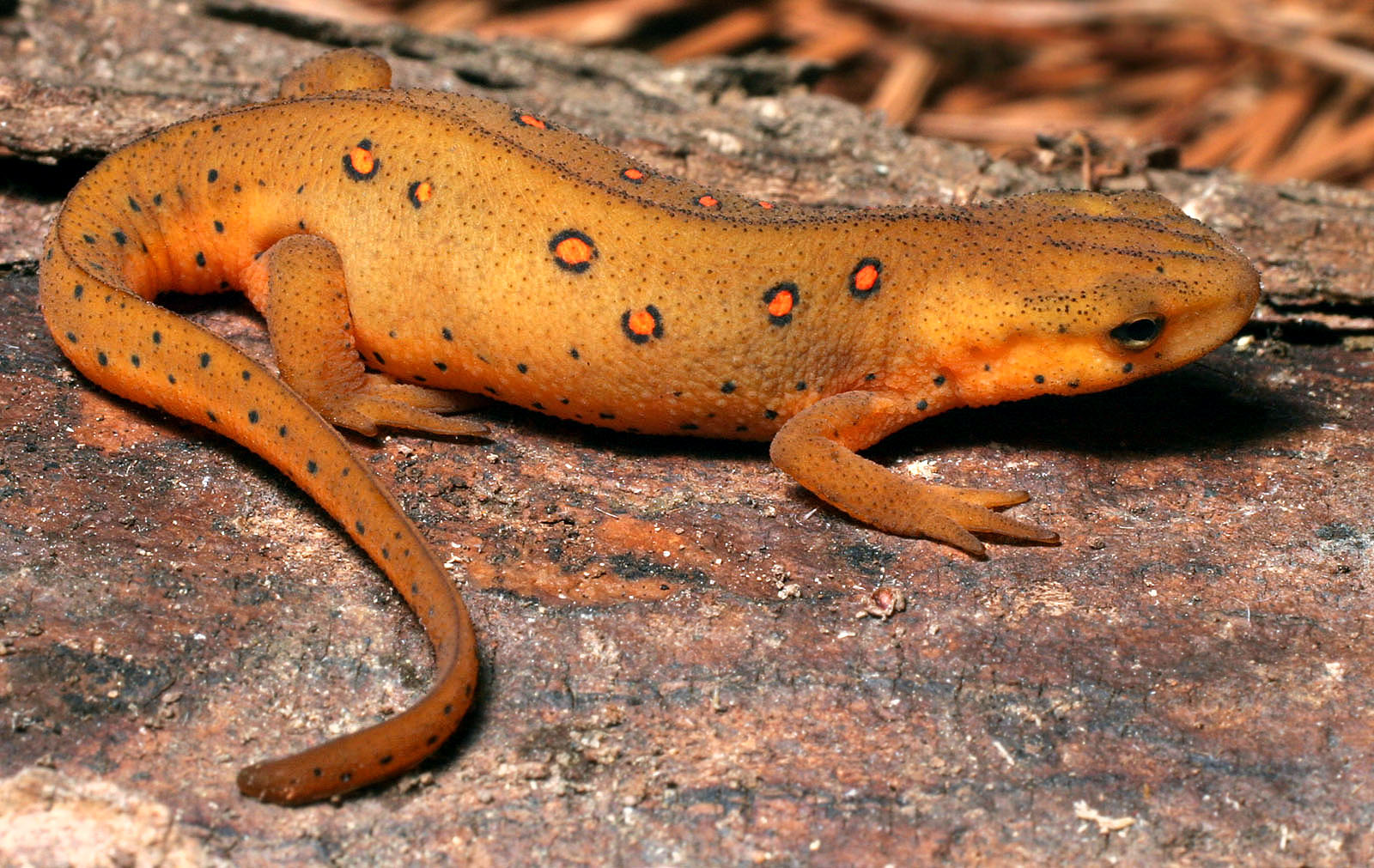
The eastern newt (Notophthalmus viridescens)

As previously mentioned, Hox genes encode transcription factors that regulate embryonic and post-embryonic developmental processes. The expression of Hox genes is regulated in part by the tight, spatial arrangement of conserved coding and non-coding DNA regions. The potential for evolutionary alterations in Hox cluster composition is viewed to be small among vertebrates. On the other hand, recent studies of a small number of non-mammalian taxa propose greater dissimilarity than initially considered. Next Generation Sequencing of considerable genomic fragments greater than 100 kilobases from the eastern newt (Notophthalmus viridescens) was analyzed. Subsequently, it was found that the composition of Hox cluster genes were conserved relative to orthologous regions from other vertebrates. Furthermore, it was found that the length of introns and intergenic regions varied. In particular, the distance between HoxD13 and HoxD11 is longer in newt than orthologous regions from vertebrate species with expanded Hox clusters and is predicted to exceed the length of the entire HoxD clusters (HoxD13–HoxD4) of humans, mice, and frogs. Many recurring DNA sequences were recognized for newt Hox clusters, counting an enrichment of DNA transposon-like sequences similar to non-coding genomic fragments. Researchers found the results to suggest that Hox cluster expansion and transposon accumulation are common features of non-mammalian tetrapod vertebrates.

After the loss of a limb, cells draw together to form a clump known as a blastema. This superficially appears undifferentiated, but cells that originated in the skin later develop into new skin, muscle cells into new muscle and cartilage cells into new cartilage. It is only the cells from just beneath the surface of the skin that are pluripotent and able to develop into any type of cell. Salamander Hox genomic regions show elements of conservation and variety in comparison to other vertebrate species. Whereas the structure and organization of Hox coding genes is conserved, newt Hox clusters show variation in the lengths of introns and intergenic regions, and the HoxD13–11 region exceeds the lengths of orthologous segments even among vertebrate species with expanded Hox clusters. Researchers have suggested that the HoxD13–11 expansion predated a basal salamander genome size amplification that occurred approximately 191 million years ago, because it preserved in all three extant amphibian groups. Supplementary verification supports the proposal that Hox clusters are acquiescent to structural evolution and variation is present in the lengths of introns and intergenic regions, relatively high numbers of repetitive sequences, and non-random accumulations of DNA transposons in newts and lizards. Researchers found that the non-random accretion of DNA-like transposons could possibly change developmental encoding by generating sequence motifs for transcriptional control.

In conclusion, the available data from several non-mammalian tetrapods suggest that Hox structural flexibility is the rule, not the exception. It is thought that this elasticity may allow for developmental variation across non-mammalian taxa. This is of course true for both embryogenesis and during the redeployment of Hox genes during post-embryonic developmental processes, such as metamorphosis and regeneration.

== Gradient fields ==
Another phenomena that exists in animal models is the presence of gradient fields in early development. More specifically, this has been shown in the aquatic amphibian: the newt. These "gradient fields" as they are known in developmental biology, have the ability to form the appropriate tissues that they are designed to form when cells from other parts of the embryo are introduced or transplanted into specific fields. The first reporting of this was in 1934. Originally, the specific mechanism behind this rather bizarre phenomenon was not known, however Hox genes have been shown to be prevalent behind this process. More specifically, a concept now known as polarity has been implemented as one - but not the only one - of the mechanisms that are driving this development.

Studies done by Oliver and colleagues in 1988 showed that different concentrations of XIHbox 1 antigen was present along the anterior-posterior mesoderm of various developing animal models. One conclusion that this varied concentration of protein expression is actually causing differentiation amongst various tissues and could be one of the culprits behind these so-called "gradient fields". While the protein products of Hox genes are strongly involved in these fields and differentiation in amphibians and reptiles, there are other causality factors involved. For example, retinoic acid and other growth factors have been shown to play a role in these gradient fields.
