= HOXB5 =

Protein-coding gene in humans

Identifiers
- Aliases: HOXB5, HHO.C10, HOX2, HOX2A, HU-1, Hox2.1, homeobox B5
- External IDs: OMIM: 142960; MGI: 96186; GeneCards: HOXB5

Gene location (Human)
Chr.	Chromosome 17 (human)
Band	17q21.32	Start	48,591,257 bp
Band	17q21.32	End	48,593,779 bp

Gene location (Mouse)
Chr.	Chromosome 11 (mouse)
Band	11 D|11 59.82 cM	Start	96,194,162 bp
Band	11 D|11 59.82 cM	End	96,196,947 bp
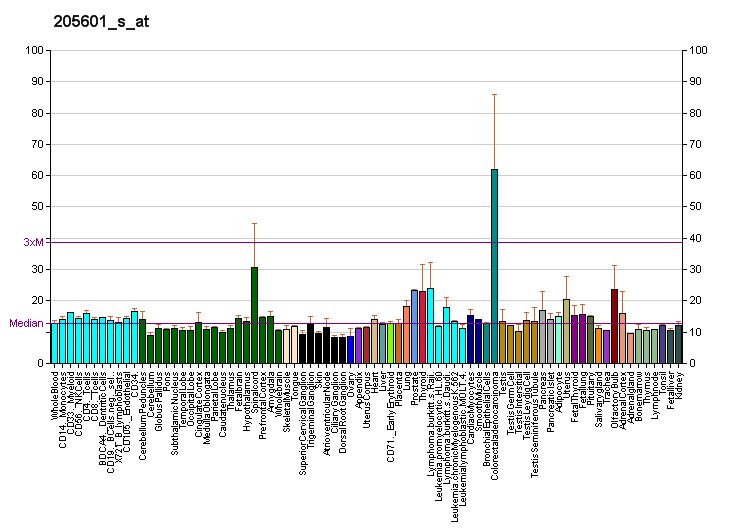

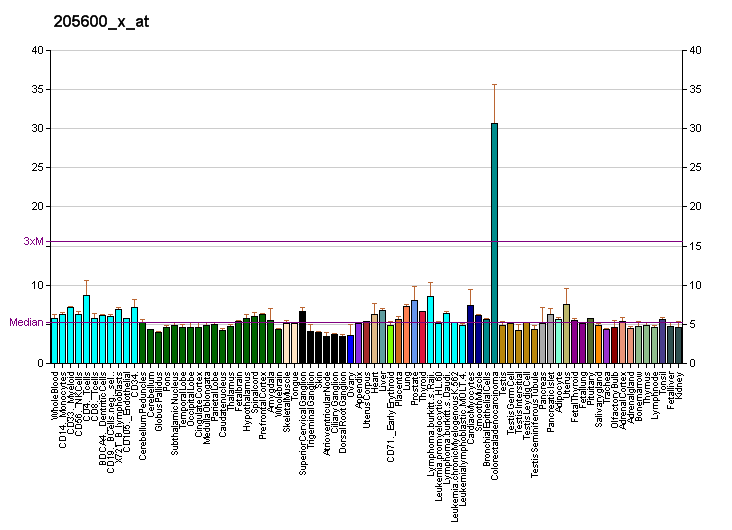
RNA expression pattern
Bgee	Human / Mouse (ortholog); Top expressed in: mucosa of transverse colon; mucosa of ileum; corpus epididymis; pancreatic ductal cell; dorsal motor nucleus of vagus nerve; human kidney; endometrium; seminal vesicula; muscle layer of sigmoid colon; inferior olivary nucleus / Top expressed in: inferior ganglion of vagus nerve; motor neuron; anterior horn of spinal cord; migratory enteric neural crest cell; thoracic vertebral column; pontine nuclei; tail of embryo; medullary collecting duct; Paneth cell; lumbar subsegment of spinal cord; More reference expression data
BioGPS	More reference expression data
Gene ontology
Molecular function	protein binding; DNA-binding transcription activator activity, RNA polymerase II-specific; sequence-specific DNA binding; DNA-binding transcription factor activity; RNA polymerase II cis-regulatory region sequence-specific DNA binding; DNA binding; DNA-binding transcription factor activity, RNA polymerase II-specific; transcription factor activity, RNA polymerase II distal enhancer sequence-specific binding
Cellular component	fibrillar center; nucleus; cytosol
Biological process	positive regulation of transcription by RNA polymerase II; anatomical structure morphogenesis; transcription by RNA polymerase II; regulation of transcription, DNA-templated; multicellular organism development; embryonic skeletal system development; endothelial cell differentiation; anterior/posterior pattern specification; embryonic skeletal system morphogenesis; transcription, DNA-templated
Sources:Amigo / QuickGO
Orthologs
Databases	NCBI: entry; OMA: entry
Species	Human	Mouse
Entrez	3215	15413
Ensembl	ENSG00000120075	ENSMUSG00000038700
UniProt	P09067	P09079
RefSeq (mRNA)	NM_002147	NM_008268
RefSeq (protein)	NP_002138	NP_032294
Location (UCSC)	Chr 17: 48.59 – 48.59 Mb	Chr 11: 96.19 – 96.2 Mb
PubMed search
- Wikidata
View/Edit Human	View/Edit Mouse

Homeobox protein Hox-B5 is a protein that in humans is encoded by the HOXB5 gene.

== Function ==
This gene is a member of the Antp homeobox family and encodes a nuclear protein with a homeobox DNA-binding domain. It is included in a cluster of homeobox B genes located on chromosome 17. The encoded protein functions as a sequence-specific transcription factor that is involved in lung and gut development. Increased expression of this gene is associated with a distinct biologic subset of acute myeloid leukemia (AML) and the occurrence of bronchopulmonary sequestration (BPS) and congenital cystic adenomatoid malformation (CCAM) tissue.

== See also ==
- Myeloid tissue
