= HOXB8 =

Protein-coding gene in the species Homo sapiens

Identifiers
- Aliases: HOXB8, HOX2, HOX2D, Hox-2.4, homeobox B8
- External IDs: OMIM: 142963; MGI: 96189; GeneCards: HOXB8

Gene location (Human)
Chr.	Chromosome 17 (human)
Band	17q21.32	Start	48,611,377 bp
Band	17q21.32	End	48,615,292 bp

Gene location (Mouse)
Chr.	Chromosome 11 (mouse)
Band	11 D|11 59.82 cM	Start	96,172,731 bp
Band	11 D|11 59.82 cM	End	96,176,141 bp
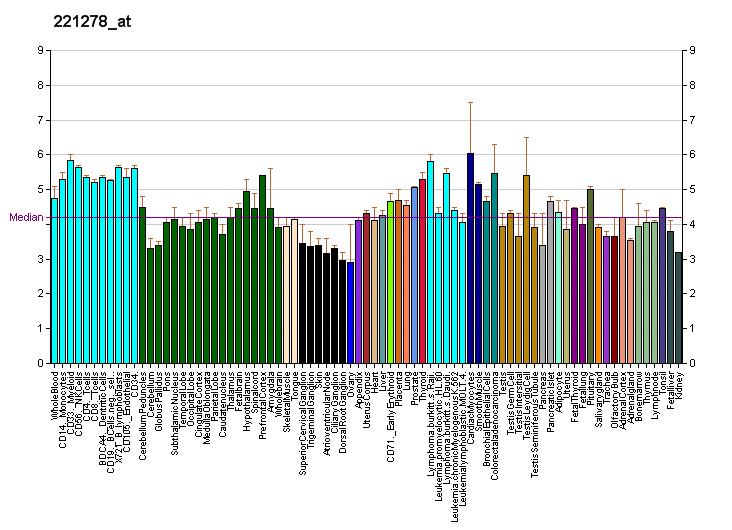

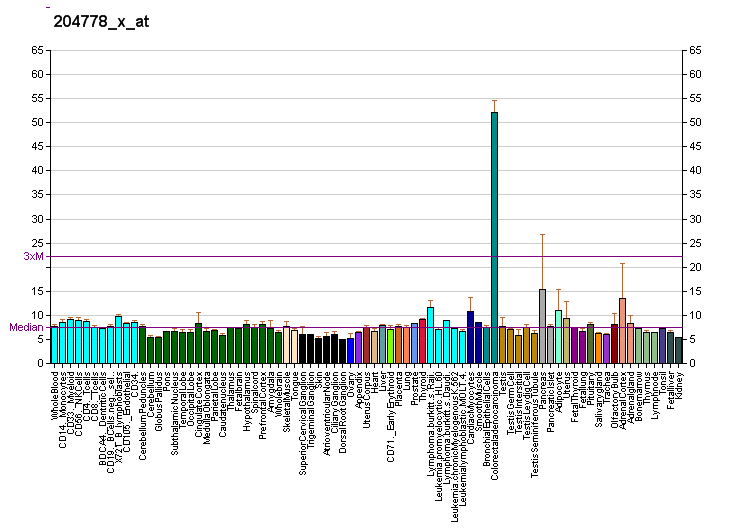
RNA expression pattern
Bgee	Human / Mouse (ortholog); Top expressed in: corpus epididymis; seminal vesicula; C1 segment; gonad; human kidney; mucosa of ileum; mucosa of transverse colon; right adrenal gland; caput epididymis; left adrenal cortex / Top expressed in: lumbar subsegment of spinal cord; tail of embryo; transitional epithelium of urinary bladder; thoracic vertebral column; paramesonephric duct; paraxial mesoderm; perirhinal cortex; urethra; motor neuron; entorhinal cortex; More reference expression data
BioGPS	More reference expression data
Gene ontology
Molecular function	DNA-binding transcription factor activity; sequence-specific DNA binding; DNA binding; DNA-binding transcription factor activity, RNA polymerase II-specific
Cellular component	nucleus; nucleoplasm
Biological process	embryonic skeletal system morphogenesis; multicellular organism development; adult locomotory behavior; grooming behavior; sensory perception of pain; skeletal system morphogenesis; dorsal spinal cord development; regulation of transcription, DNA-templated; negative regulation of myeloid cell differentiation; transcription, DNA-templated; anterior/posterior pattern specification; negative regulation of transcription by RNA polymerase II
Sources:Amigo / QuickGO
Orthologs
Databases	NCBI: entry; OMA: entry
Species	Human	Mouse
Entrez	3218	15416
Ensembl	ENSG00000120068	ENSMUSG00000056648
UniProt	P17481	P09632
RefSeq (mRNA)	NM_024016	NM_010461
RefSeq (protein)	NP_076921	NP_034591
Location (UCSC)	Chr 17: 48.61 – 48.62 Mb	Chr 11: 96.17 – 96.18 Mb
PubMed search
- Wikidata
View/Edit Human	View/Edit Mouse

Homeobox protein Hox-B8 is a protein that in humans is encoded by the HOXB8 gene.

== Function ==
This gene is a member of the Antp homeobox family and encodes a nuclear protein with a homeobox DNA-binding domain. It is included in a cluster of Homeobox B genes located on chromosome 17. The encoded protein functions as a sequence-specific transcription factor that is involved in development. Increased expression of this gene is associated with colorectal cancer. Mice that have had the murine ortholog (see Homology (biology) § Orthology) of this gene knocked out exhibit an excessive pathologic grooming behavior. This behavior is similar to the hair-pulling behavior of humans suffering from trichotillomania (TTM).

Transplantation of normal (wild-type) bone marrow into a Hoxb8 mutant mouse results in a reduction of compulsive grooming.

== See also ==
- Homeobox
