= HOXB6 =

Protein-coding gene in the species Homo sapiens

Identifiers
- Aliases: HOXB6, HOX2, HOX2B, HU-2, Hox-2.2, homeobox B6
- External IDs: OMIM: 142961; MGI: 96187; GeneCards: HOXB6

Gene location (Human)
Chr.	Chromosome 17 (human)
Band	17q21.32	Start	48,595,751 bp
Band	17q21.32	End	48,604,992 bp

Gene location (Mouse)
Chr.	Chromosome 11 (mouse)
Band	11 D|11 59.82 cM	Start	96,183,302 bp
Band	11 D|11 59.82 cM	End	96,192,395 bp
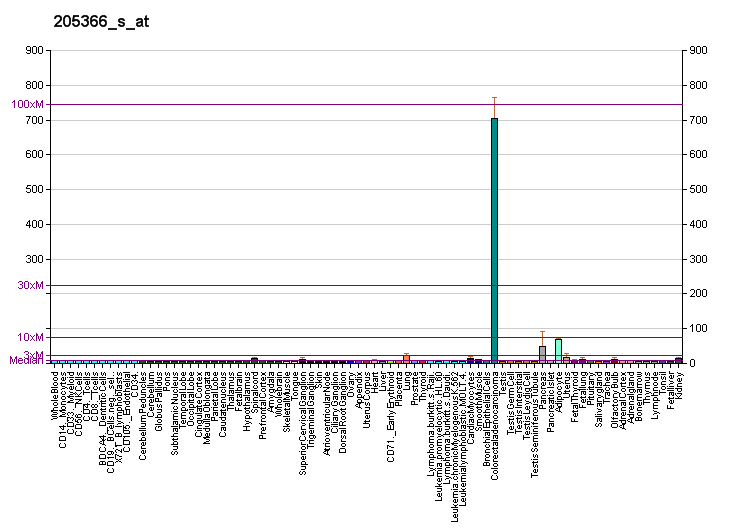
RNA expression pattern
Bgee	Human / Mouse (ortholog); Top expressed in: corpus epididymis; seminal vesicula; caput epididymis; right uterine tube; transverse colon; mucosa of transverse colon; tail of epididymis; human kidney; renal medulla; endometrium / Top expressed in: thoracic vertebral column; seminal vesicula; lumbar subsegment of spinal cord; tail of embryo; adrenal gland; allantois; anterior horn of spinal cord; inner renal medulla; right kidney; renal cortex; More reference expression data
BioGPS	More reference expression data
Gene ontology
Molecular function	DNA-binding transcription factor activity; sequence-specific DNA binding; DNA binding; protein binding; RNA binding; RNA polymerase II cis-regulatory region sequence-specific DNA binding; DNA-binding transcription factor activity, RNA polymerase II-specific; DNA-binding transcription activator activity, RNA polymerase II-specific
Cellular component	nucleus
Biological process	embryonic skeletal system morphogenesis; multicellular organism development; erythrocyte homeostasis; regulation of transcription, DNA-templated; transcription, DNA-templated; anterior/posterior pattern specification; embryonic skeletal system development; regulation of transcription by RNA polymerase II; positive regulation of transcription by RNA polymerase II
Sources:Amigo / QuickGO
Orthologs
Databases	NCBI: entry; OMA: entry
Species	Human	Mouse
Entrez	3216	15414
Ensembl	ENSG00000108511	ENSMUSG00000000690
UniProt	P17509	P09023
RefSeq (mRNA)	NM_018952; NM_156036; NM_156037; NM_001369397	NM_008269
RefSeq (protein)	NP_061825; NP_001356326	NP_032295
Location (UCSC)	Chr 17: 48.6 – 48.6 Mb	Chr 11: 96.18 – 96.19 Mb
PubMed search
- Wikidata
View/Edit Human	View/Edit Mouse

Homeobox protein Hox-B6 is a protein that in humans is encoded by the HOXB6 gene.

== Function ==
This gene is a member of the Antp homeobox family and encodes a protein with a homeobox DNA-binding domain. It is included in a cluster of homeobox B genes located on chromosome 17. The encoded protein functions as a sequence-specific transcription factor that is involved in development, including that of lung and skin, and has been localized to both the nucleus and cytoplasm. Altered expression of this gene or a change in the subcellular localization of its protein is associated with some cases of acute myeloid leukemia and colorectal cancer.

== During development ==
HOXB6 gene is only expressed in erythroid progenitor cells, which are the precursor to red blood cells used for transport of oxygen and carbon dioxide throughout the body. During development, the formation of the HOX gene factor happens in the first stages of fetal development, namely soon after the establishment of the mesoderm, which is the “middle layer” of the future embryo. However, HOXB6 is only expressed once the undifferentiated stem cells of the embryo distinguish themselves into the erythpoietic phase. The research has shown that HOXB6 is not expressed in hematopoietic stem cells located in the red bone marrow, which are the precursor cells to all types of blood cells, or primordial germ cells (PGCs), the precursor to cells passed on in each generation. Since it is a transcriptional factor, HOXB6 regulates erythropoiesis (red blood cell formation) using mRNA as the basis for certain protein productions. The specific gene factor for erythrogenesis has relatively been unobserved in the scientific community, and no known diseases have been associated with a defect HOXB6 gene. However, it has been shown in correlation with major skeletal deformations.

HOXB6 is a structural protein that has been shown to influence the growth and differentiation of the different blood lineages. This gene has also been shown to encourage the growth of granulocytes and monocytes, but at the cost of other blood cells. HOXB6 has the ability to cause the indefinite proliferation of murine marrow cells, as well as expand hematopoietic stem cells. When expressed abnormally, HOXB6 displays many characteristics of a potent oncoprotein. An oncoprotein can cause the transformation of a normal cell into a tumor cell. Overexpression of HOXB6, along with the addition of MEIS1 protein, has been implicated in the development of acute myeloid leukemia (AML). Acute myeloid leukemia is a cancer of the blood cells, specifically the leukocytes. The chromosomal irregularity most frequently seen in HOXB6 AML is a reappearing interstitial deletion of chromosome 2. Fundamental HOXB6 expression stops myeloid differentiation and debilitates erythropoiesis, megakaryopoiesis, and lymphopoiesis.

== See also ==
- Leukemia
- Myeloid tissue
