= Homeosis =

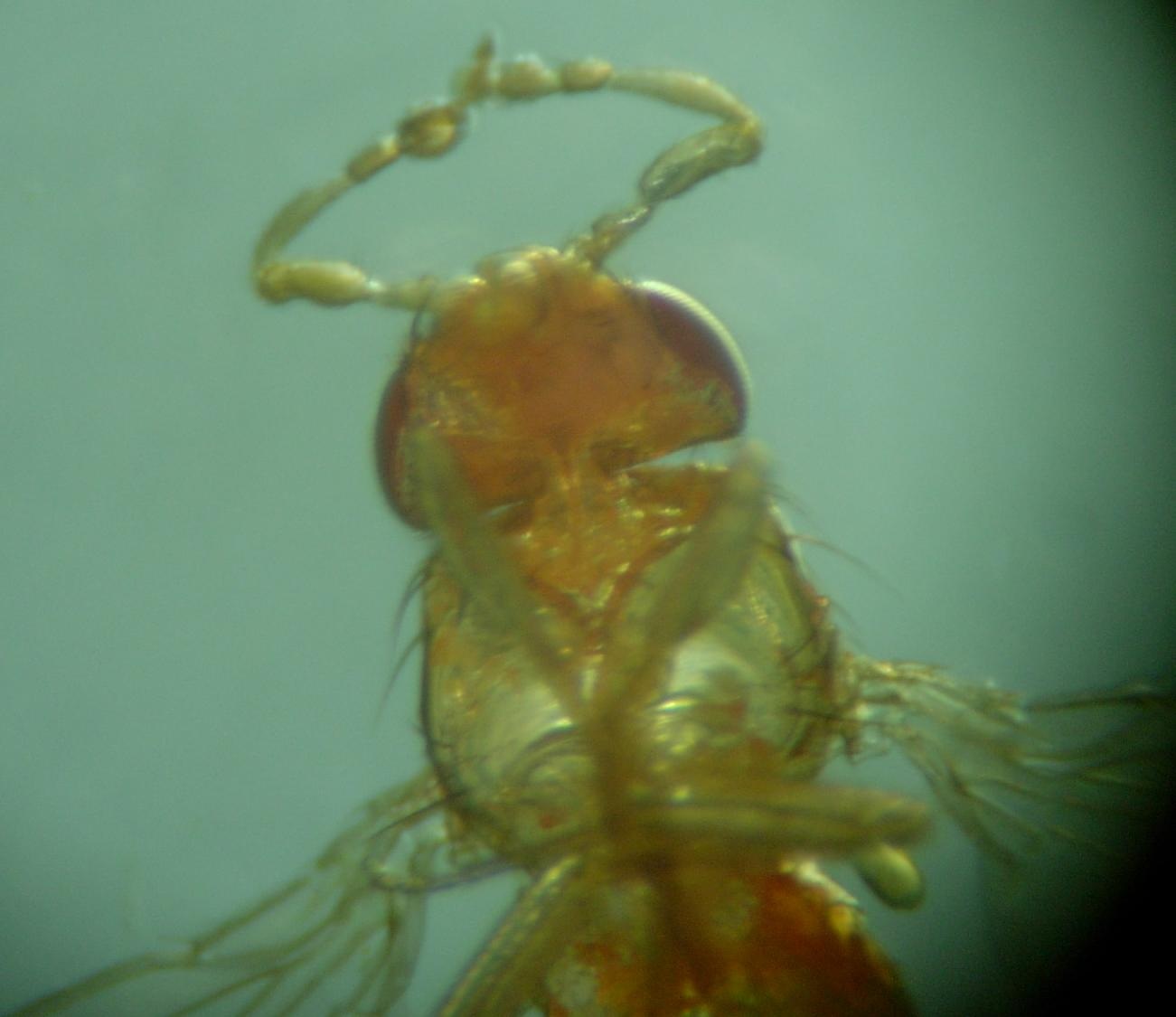
Antennapedia mutation

In evolutionary developmental biology, homeosis is the transformation of one organ into another, arising from mutation in or misexpression of certain developmentally critical genes, specifically homeotic genes. In animals, these developmental genes specifically control the development of organs on their anteroposterior axis. In plants, however, the developmental genes affected by homeosis may control anything from the development of a stamen or petals to the development of chlorophyll. Homeosis may be caused by mutations in Hox genes, found in animals, or others such as the MADS-box family in plants. Homeosis is a characteristic that has helped insects become as successful and diverse as they are.

Homeotic mutations work by changing segment identity during development. For example, the Ultrabithorax genotype gives a phenotype wherein metathoracic and first abdominal segments become mesothoracic segments. Another well-known example is Antennapedia: a gain-of-function allele causes legs to develop in the place of antennae.

In botany, Rolf Sattler has revised the concept of homeosis (replacement) by his emphasis on partial homeosis in addition to complete homeosis; this revision is now widely accepted.

Homeotic mutants in angiosperms are thought to be rare in the wild: in the annual plant Clarkia (Onagraceae), homeotic mutants are known where the petals are replaced by a second whorl of sepal-like organs, originating in a mutation of a single gene. The absence of lethal or deleterious consequences in floral mutants resulting in distinct morphological expressions has been a factor in the evolution of Clarkia, and perhaps also in many other plant groups.

== Homeotic mechanisms in animals ==
Following the work on homeotic mutants by Ed Lewis, the phenomenology of homeosis in animals was further elaborated by discovery of a conserved DNA binding sequence present in many homeotic proteins. Thus, the 60 amino acid DNA binding protein domain was named the homeodomain, while the 180 bp nucleotide sequence encoding it was named the homeobox. The homeobox gene clusters studied by Ed Lewis were named the Hox genes, although many more homeobox genes are encoded by animal genomes than those in the Hox gene clusters.

The homeotic-function of certain proteins was first postulated to be that of a "selector" as proposed by Antonio García-Bellido. By definition selectors were imagined to be (transcription factor) proteins that stably determined one of two possible cell fates for a cell and its cellular descendants in a tissue. While most animal homeotic functions are associated with homeobox-containing factors, not all homeotic proteins in animals are encoded by homeobox genes, and further not all homeobox genes are necessarily associated with homeotic functions or (mutant) phenotypes. The concept of homeotic selectors was further elaborated or at least qualified by Michael Akam in a so-called "post-selector gene" model that incorporated additional findings and "walked back" the "orthodoxy" of selector-dependent stable binary switches.

The concept of tissue compartments is deeply intertwined with the selector model of homeosis because the selector-mediated maintenance of cell fate can be restricted into different organizational units of an animal's body plan. In this context, newer insights into homeotic mechanisms were found by Albert Erives and colleagues by focusing on enhancer DNAs that are co-targeted by homeotic selectors and different combinations of developmental signals. This work identifies a protein biochemical difference between the transcription factors that function as homeotic selectors versus the transcription factors that function as effectors of developmental signaling pathways, such as the Notch signaling pathway and the BMP signaling pathway. This work proposes that homeotic selectors function to "license" enhancer DNAs in a restricted tissue compartment so that the enhancers are enabled to read-out developmental signals, which are then integrated via polyglutamine-mediated aggregation.

== Homeotic mechanisms in plants ==
Like the complex multicellularity seen in animals, the multicellularity of land plants is developmentally organized into tissue and organ units via transcription factor genes with homeotic effects. Although plants have homeobox-containing genes, plant homeotic factors tend to possess MADS-box DNA binding domains. Animal genomes also possess a small number MADS-box factors. Thus, in the independent evolution of multicellularity in plants and animals, different eukaryotic transcription factor families were co-opted to serve homeotic functions. MADS-domain factors have been proposed to function as co-factors to more specialized factors and thereby help to determine organ identity. This has been proposed to correspond more closely to the interpretation of animal homeotics outlined by Michael Akam.

== See also ==
- Homeotic gene, includes most of the Hox genes
- Homeobox, a DNA segment found in Hox genes
