= HIST3H2A =

Protein-coding gene in humans

H2AW

Identifiers
- Aliases: H2AW, histone cluster 3 H2A, HIST3H2A, H2A.W histone
- External IDs: OMIM: 615015; MGI: 2448458; GeneCards: H2AW

Gene location (Human)
Chr.	Chromosome 1 (human)
Band	1q42.13	Start	228,434,777 bp
Band	1q42.13	End	228,457,873 bp

Gene location (Mouse)
Chr.	Chromosome 11 (mouse)
Band	11|11 B1.3	Start	58,845,511 bp
Band	11|11 B1.3	End	58,847,656 bp
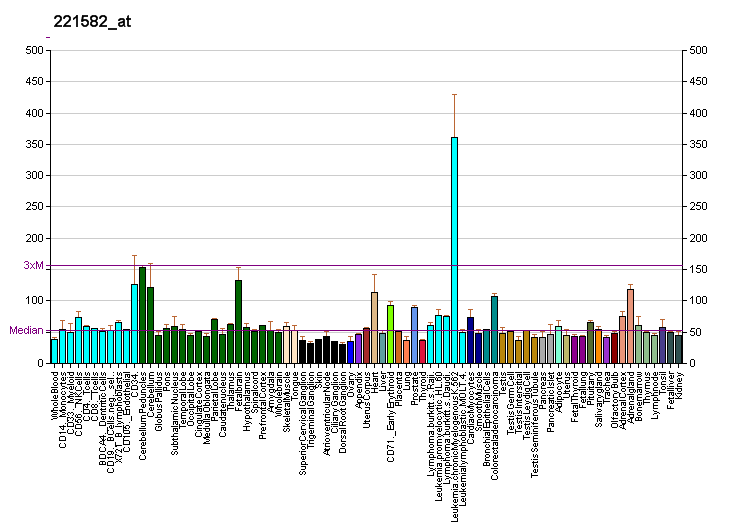
RNA expression pattern
Bgee	Human / Mouse (ortholog); Top expressed in: cerebellar hemisphere; right hemisphere of cerebellum; testicle; ganglionic eminence; left adrenal cortex; apex of heart; right adrenal gland; right adrenal cortex; gonad; ventricular zone / Top expressed in: spermatocyte; retinal pigment epithelium; neural layer of retina; medial ganglionic eminence; lens; epithelium of lens; external carotid artery; ciliary body; olfactory bulb; trigeminal ganglion; More reference expression data
BioGPS	More reference expression data
Gene ontology
Molecular function	DNA binding; protein heterodimerization activity; protein binding
Cellular component	nucleosome; extracellular exosome; nucleus; chromosome
Biological process	nucleosome disassembly; UV-damage excision repair; chromatin organization
Sources:Amigo / QuickGO
Orthologs
Databases	NCBI: entry; OMA: entry
Species	Human	Mouse
Entrez	92815	319162
Ensembl	ENSG00000181218; ENSG00000284841	ENSMUSG00000078851
UniProt	Q7L7L0	Q8BFU2
RefSeq (mRNA)	NM_033445	NM_178218
RefSeq (protein)	NP_254280	NP_835736
Location (UCSC)	Chr 1: 228.43 – 228.46 Mb	Chr 11: 58.85 – 58.85 Mb
PubMed search
- Wikidata
View/Edit Human	View/Edit Mouse

Histone H2A type 3 is a protein that in humans is encoded by the HIST3H2A gene.

Histones are basic nuclear proteins that are responsible for the nucleosome structure of the chromosomal fiber in eukaryotes. Nucleosomes consist of approximately 146 bp of DNA wrapped around a histone octamer composed of pairs of each of the four core histones (H2A, H2B, H3, and H4). The chromatin fiber is further compacted through the interaction of a linker histone, H1, with the DNA between the nucleosomes to form higher order chromatin structures. This gene is intronless and encodes a member of the histone H2A family. Transcripts from this gene contain a palindromic termination element.
