= HOXB4 =

Protein-coding gene in humans

Identifiers
- Aliases: HOXB4, HOX-2.6, HOX2, HOX2F, homeobox B4
- External IDs: OMIM: 142965; MGI: 96185; GeneCards: HOXB4

Gene location (Human)
Chr.	Chromosome 17 (human)
Band	17q21.32	Start	48,575,507 bp
Band	17q21.32	End	48,578,350 bp

Gene location (Mouse)
Chr.	Chromosome 11 (mouse)
Band	11 D|11 59.83 cM	Start	96,209,093 bp
Band	11 D|11 59.83 cM	End	96,212,464 bp
RNA expression pattern
Bgee	Human / Mouse (ortholog); Top expressed in: right uterine tube; muscle layer of sigmoid colon; gastric mucosa; endometrium; Descending thoracic aorta; left uterine tube; human kidney; right lung; fundus; right adrenal gland / Top expressed in: tail of embryo; thoracic vertebral column; migratory enteric neural crest cell; medullary collecting duct; ascending aorta; granulocyte; female urethra; inner root sheath; primitive streak; renal corpuscle; More reference expression data
BioGPS	n/a
Gene ontology
Molecular function	DNA-binding transcription factor activity; sequence-specific DNA binding; DNA binding; DNA-binding transcription factor activity, RNA polymerase II-specific; RNA polymerase II transcription regulatory region sequence-specific DNA binding; DNA-binding transcription activator activity, RNA polymerase II-specific
Cellular component	nucleus; centrosome
Biological process	embryonic skeletal system morphogenesis; multicellular organism development; definitive hemopoiesis; somatic stem cell division; skeletal system morphogenesis; cell population proliferation; positive regulation of stem cell differentiation; regulation of transcription, DNA-templated; negative regulation of transcription by RNA polymerase II; spleen development; hematopoietic stem cell differentiation; morphogenesis of an epithelial sheet; transcription, DNA-templated; anterior/posterior pattern specification; positive regulation of transcription by RNA polymerase II; bone marrow development; hemopoiesis; skeletal system development
Sources:Amigo / QuickGO
Orthologs
Databases	NCBI: entry; OMA: entry
Species	Human	Mouse
Entrez	3214	15412
Ensembl	ENSG00000182742	ENSMUSG00000038692
UniProt	P17483	P10284
RefSeq (mRNA)	NM_024015	NM_010459
RefSeq (protein)	NP_076920	NP_034589
Location (UCSC)	Chr 17: 48.58 – 48.58 Mb	Chr 11: 96.21 – 96.21 Mb
PubMed search
- Wikidata
View/Edit Human	View/Edit Mouse

Homeobox protein Hox-B4 is a protein that in humans is encoded by the HOXB4 gene.

== Function ==
This gene is a member of the Antp homeobox family and encodes a nuclear protein with a homeobox DNA-binding domain. It is included in a cluster of homeobox B genes located on chromosome 17. The encoded protein functions as a sequence-specific transcription factor that is involved in development. Intracellular or ectopic expression of this protein expands hematopoietic stem and progenitor cells in vivo and in vitro, making it a potential candidate for therapeutic stem cell expansion.

== See also ==
- Homeobox
