= PARP14 =

Protein-coding gene in the species Homo sapiens

Identifiers
- Aliases: PARP14, ARTD8, BAL2, PARP-14, pART8, poly(ADP-ribose) polymerase family member 14
- External IDs: OMIM: 610028; MGI: 1919489; GeneCards: PARP14
Available structures
| PDB | Ortholog search: PDBe RCSB |
| PDB | List of PDB id codes 3GOY, 3Q6Z, 3Q71, 3SE2, 3SMI, 3SMJ, 3VFQ, 4ABK, 4ABL, 4D86, 4F1L, 4F1Q, 4PY4 |

Gene location (Human)
| Chr. | Chromosome 3 (human) |
| Band | 3q21.1 | Start | 122,680,839 bp |
| Band | 3q21.1 | End | 122,730,840 bp |

Gene location (Mouse)
| Chr. | Chromosome 16 (mouse) |
| Band | 16|16 B3 | Start | 35,653,244 bp |
| Band | 16|16 B3 | End | 35,691,914 bp |
RNA expression pattern
| Bgee | Human / Mouse (ortholog); Top expressed in: sural nerve; nasal epithelium; Achilles tendon; white blood cell; monocyte; spleen; granulocyte; decidua; appendix; lymph node / Top expressed in: intestinal villus; Paneth cell; epithelium of small intestine; lymph node; jejunum; mesenteric lymph nodes; lumbar spinal ganglion; mucous cell of stomach; white pulp; conjunctival fornix; More reference expression data |
| BioGPS | n/a |
Gene ontology
| Molecular function | transferase activity; glycosyltransferase activity; RNA binding; protein binding; NAD+ binding; NAD+ ADP-ribosyltransferase activity; enzyme binding; protein ADP-ribosylase activity |
| Cellular component | membrane; nucleus; cytosol; cytoplasm |
| Biological process | regulation of transcription, DNA-templated; transcription, DNA-templated; protein poly-ADP-ribosylation; protein ADP-ribosylation; negative regulation of gene expression; positive regulation of tyrosine phosphorylation of STAT protein; negative regulation of tyrosine phosphorylation of STAT protein; negative regulation of interferon-gamma-mediated signaling pathway; positive regulation of interleukin-4-mediated signaling pathway; immune system process; innate immune response; protein mono-ADP-ribosylation |
Sources:Amigo / QuickGO
Orthologs
| Databases | NCBI: entry; OMA: entry |
| Species | Human | Mouse |
| Entrez | 54625 | 547253 |
| Ensembl | ENSG00000173193 | ENSMUSG00000034422 |
| UniProt | Q460N5; Q8N546 | Q2EMV9 |
| RefSeq (mRNA) | NM_017554 | NM_001039530 |
| RefSeq (protein) | NP_060024; NP_060024.2 | NP_001034619 |
| Location (UCSC) | Chr 3: 122.68 – 122.73 Mb | Chr 16: 35.65 – 35.69 Mb |
| PubMed search |
- Wikidata
| View/Edit Human | View/Edit Mouse |

Poly(ADP-ribose) polymerase family member 14 is a protein that, in humans, is encoded by the PARP14 gene.

== Function ==
Poly(ADP-ribosyl)ation is an immediate DNA damage-dependent post-translational modification of histones and other nuclear proteins that contributes to the survival of injured proliferating cells. PARP14 belongs to the superfamily of enzymes that perform this modification (Ame et al., 2004 [PubMed 15273990]).
