= HOXA7 =

Protein-coding gene in the species Homo sapiens

Identifiers
- Aliases: HOXA7, ANTP, HOX1, HOX1.1, HOX1A, homeobox A7
- External IDs: OMIM: 142950; MGI: 96179; GeneCards: HOXA7

Gene location (Human)
Chr.	Chromosome 7 (human)
Band	7p15.2	Start	27,153,716 bp
Band	7p15.2	End	27,157,936 bp

Gene location (Mouse)
Chr.	Chromosome 6 (mouse)
Band	6 B3|6 25.4 cM	Start	52,191,471 bp
Band	6 B3|6 25.4 cM	End	52,198,834 bp
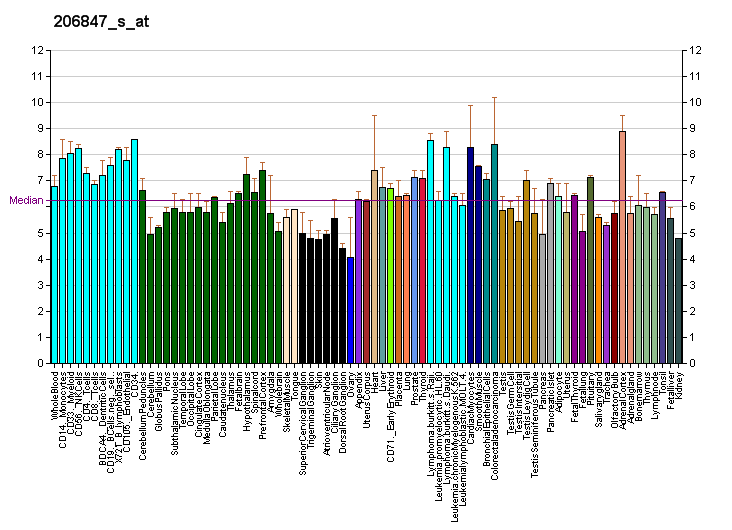
RNA expression pattern
Bgee	Human / Mouse (ortholog); Top expressed in: oocyte; mucosa of transverse colon; secondary oocyte; sperm; biceps brachii; tendon of biceps brachii; Skeletal muscle tissue of biceps brachii; gonad; right adrenal gland; right adrenal cortex / Top expressed in: tail of embryo; zygote; right kidney; secondary oocyte; thoracic vertebral column; proximal tubule; muscle of thigh; embryo; neural tube; efferent ductule; More reference expression data
BioGPS	More reference expression data
Gene ontology
Molecular function	sequence-specific DNA binding; DNA binding; DNA-binding transcription factor activity; DNA-binding transcription activator activity, RNA polymerase II-specific; transcription factor binding; RNA polymerase II cis-regulatory region sequence-specific DNA binding; DNA-binding transcription factor activity, RNA polymerase II-specific; transcription factor activity, RNA polymerase II distal enhancer sequence-specific binding
Cellular component	nucleus; nucleoplasm; nuclear membrane
Biological process	embryonic skeletal system morphogenesis; negative regulation of monocyte differentiation; negative regulation of keratinocyte differentiation; regulation of transcription, DNA-templated; negative regulation of transcription by RNA polymerase II; stem cell differentiation; transcription, DNA-templated; negative regulation of cell-matrix adhesion; multicellular organism development; angiogenesis; negative regulation of transcription, DNA-templated; negative regulation of leukocyte migration; anterior/posterior pattern specification; positive regulation of transcription by RNA polymerase II; transcription by RNA polymerase II
Sources:Amigo / QuickGO
Orthologs
Databases	NCBI: entry; OMA: entry
Species	Human	Mouse
Entrez	3204	15404
Ensembl	ENSG00000122592	ENSMUSG00000038236
UniProt	P31268	P02830
RefSeq (mRNA)	NM_006896	NM_010455
RefSeq (protein)	NP_008827	NP_034585
Location (UCSC)	Chr 7: 27.15 – 27.16 Mb	Chr 6: 52.19 – 52.2 Mb
PubMed search
- Wikidata
View/Edit Human	View/Edit Mouse

Homeobox protein Hox-A7 is a protein that in humans is encoded by the HOXA7 gene.

In vertebrates, the genes encoding the class of transcription factors called homeobox genes are found in clusters named A, B, C, and D on four separate chromosomes. Expression of these proteins is spatially and temporally regulated during embryonic development. This gene is part of the A cluster on chromosome 7 and encodes a DNA-binding transcription factor which may regulate gene expression, morphogenesis, and differentiation. For example, the encoded protein represses the transcription of differentiation-specific genes during keratinocyte proliferation, but this repression is then overcome by differentiation signals. This gene is highly similar to the antennapedia (Antp) gene of Drosophila.

== See also ==
- Homeobox
