= Proboscipedia (fly gene) =

Homeotic protein Proboscipedia

Identifiers
- Organism: Drosophila melanogaster
- Symbol: pb
- UniProt: P31264
Search for
- Structures: Swiss-model
- Domains: InterPro

Proboscipedia (pb) is a protein coding gene in Drosophila melanogaster.

== Function ==
This hox gene participates in the development of the labial and maxillary palps and mouthparts in the Drosophila fly. The pb gene is known to regulate the location of the antenna, maxillary palp, tarsus and proboscis identities.

== Taxonomy ==
Proboscipedia belongs to the Antennapedia (Antp) homeobox family and the Proboscipedia subfamily. A homeobox gene is a transcription factor in which a region known as a homeodomain binds to a target gene promoter and controls the differentiation and development of cells. The pb gene is evidenced to be associated with the Sex combs reduced (Scr) gene. Both of these are essential for determination of the proboscis, a long flexible mouthpart in many insects used for the purpose of sucking.

== Mutations ==
Mutated versions of the pb gene result in prothoracic (anterior to thorax) legs from labial palps and maxillary palps that display malformation or smaller size.
