= Tandemly arrayed genes =

Gene cluster created by tandem duplications

Tandemly arrayed genes (TAGs) are a gene cluster created by tandem duplications, a process in which one gene is duplicated and the copy is found adjacent to the original. They serve to encode large numbers of genes at a time.

TAGs represent a large proportion of genes in a genome, including between 14% and 17% of the human, mouse, and rat genomes. TAG clusters may have as few as two genes, with small clusters predominating, but may consist of hundreds of genes. An example are tandem clusters of rRNA encoding genes. These genes are transcribed faster than they would be if only a single copy of the gene was available. Additionally, a single RNA gene may not be able to provide enough RNA, but tandem repeats of the gene allow sufficient RNA to be produced. For example, cells in a human embryo contain between five and ten million ribosomes, and cell number doubles within 24 hours. In order to provide the necessary ribosomes, multiple RNA polymerases must consecutively transcribe multiple rRNA genes.

In some species, such as Arabidopsis thaliana and Oryza sativa, most TAGs are the result of unequal chromosomal crossover during genetic recombination.

== See also ==
- Satellite DNA
- Tandem repeats
