= Homeotic gene =

Genes regulating the development of anatomical structures in various organisms

Homeotic genes are genes which regulate the development of anatomical structures in various organisms such as echinoderms, insects, mammals, and plants. Homeotic genes often encode transcription factor proteins, and these proteins affect development by regulating downstream gene networks involved in body patterning.

Mutations in homeotic genes cause displaced body parts (homeosis), such as antennae growing at the posterior of the fly instead of at the head. Mutations that lead to development of ectopic structures are usually lethal.

== Types ==
There are several subsets of homeotic genes. They include many of the Hox and ParaHox genes that are important for segmentation. Hox genes are found in bilateral animals, including Drosophila (in which they were first discovered) and humans. Hox genes are a subset of the homeobox genes. The Hox genes are often conserved across species, so some of the Hox genes of Drosophila are homologous to those in humans. In general, Hox genes play a role of regulating expression of genes as well as aiding in development and assignment of specific structures during embryonic growth. This can range from segmentation in Drosophila to central nervous system (CNS) development in vertebrates. Both Hox and ParaHox are grouped as HOX-Like (HOXL) genes, a subset of the ANTP class (named after the Drosophila gene, Antennapedia).

They also include the MADS-box-containing genes involved in the ABC model of flower development. Besides flower-producing plants, the MADS-box motif is also present in other organisms such as insects, yeasts, and mammals. They have various functions depending on the organism including flower development, proto-oncogene transcription, and gene regulation in specific cells (such as muscle cells).

Despite the terms being commonly interchanged, not all homeotic genes are Hox genes; the MADS-box genes are homeotic but not Hox genes. Thus, the Hox genes are a subset of homeotic genes.

== Drosophila melanogaster ==
Homeotic selector gene complexes in the fruit fly Drosophila melanogaster

One of the most commonly studied model organisms in regards to homeotic genes is the fruit fly Drosophila melanogaster. Its homeotic Hox genes occur in either the Antennapedia complex (ANT-C) or the Bithorax complex (BX-C) discovered by Edward B. Lewis. Each of the complexes focuses on a different area of development. The antennapedia complex consists of five genes, including proboscipedia, and is involved in the development of the front of the embryo, forming the segments of the head and thorax. The bithorax complex consists of three main genes and is involved in the development of the back of the embryo, namely the abdomen and the posterior segments of the thorax.

During development (starting at the blastoderm stage of the embryo), these genes are constantly expressed to assign structures and roles to the different segments of the fly's body.

== Research ==
Much research has been done on homeotic genes in different organisms, ranging from basic understanding of how the molecules work to mutations to how homeotic genes affect the human body. Changing the expression levels of homeotic genes can negatively impact the organism. For example, in one study, a pathogenic phytoplasma caused homeotic genes in a flowering plant to either be significantly upregulated or downregulated. This led to severe phenotypic changes including dwarfing, defects in the pistils, hypopigmentation, and the development of leaf-like structures on most floral organs. In another study, it was found that the homeotic gene Cdx2 acts as a tumor suppressor. In normal expression levels, the gene prevents tumorgenesis and colorectal cancer when exposed to carcinogens; however, when Cdx2 was not well expressed, carcinogens caused tumor development. These studies, along with many others, show the importance of homeotic genes even after development.

== See also ==
- Homeobox
- Homeosis
