= Discredited hypotheses for the Cambrian explosion =

As understanding of the events of the Cambrian becomes clearer, data have accumulated to make some postulated causes for the Cambrian explosion look improbable. Some examples are the evolution of herbivory, vast changes in plate tectonic rates or orbital motion, or different evolutionary mechanisms in force.

== Developmental explanations ==
=== Regulatory genes ===
Hox genes regulate the operation of other genes by switching them on or off in various parts of the body, for example “make an eye here” or “make a leg there”. Very similar Hox genes are found in all animals from Cnidaria (e.g. jellyfish) to humans, although mammals have four sets of Hox genes while Cnidaria have only one. Hox genes in different animal groups are so similar that, for example, one can transplant a human “make an eye” Pax6 gene into a fruitfly embryo and it still causes an eye to form – but it is a fruitfly eye, because the genes that the transplanted Hox gene activates are fruitfly genes.

The fact that all animals have such similar Hox genes strongly suggests that the last common ancestor of all bilaterians had similar Hox genes. This led to speculation that the evolution of Hox genes may have paved the way for the development of complex body forms.

This is where molecular dating can be useful. A rough estimate of the age of a lineage, and indeed genes, can be achieved by assuming that mutations accumulate at a constant rate in the genome. While the dates produced by this technique are often imprecise, and vary from method to method, the technique can provide an indication of the 'relative' age of appearances.

Molecular clocks detect the radiation of three major clades of bilaterians – lophotrochozoans, deuterostomes, and ecdysozoans – during the early Cambrian. The same study also found that Hox genes diversified before these groups did – meaning that they could not have been the innovation that caused the explosion.

=== Developmental entrenchment ===
Several scientists suggest that, as organisms become more complex, changes to their basic developmental mechanisms are more likely to be disadvantageous. In this way, the basic body design becomes "stuck in a rut", because any mutation that affects such central mechanisms will probably prevent the organism from developing; mutations are only likely to be advantageous where they affect less fundamental parts of the organism. By analogy, it is difficult to make modifications to the foundations of a building without causing it to collapse, whereas alterations can easily be made to the upper floors. The taller the building grows, the more likely a modification to the foundations will be to cause it to collapse.

However, as understanding of the developmental pathways of organisms has improved, even the original proponent of this idea has realised that it is not likely to be a major factor, and examples of major post-Cambrian changes at a fundamental level have been found.

== Ecological explanations ==
=== The appearance of herbivorous organisms ===
Awramik (1973) suggested that the appearance about 700 million years ago of protists (single-celled eukaryotes) that "cropped" microbial mats greatly expanded food chains, and thus allowed rapid diversification, which led to the Cambrian explosion, but "cropping" is now thought to have arisen before 1 billion years ago, as stromatolites began to decline about 1.25 billion years ago.

== Environmental explanations ==
=== Methane release ===
Others have suggested that each short-term decrease in the ^{13}C/^{12}C ratio throughout the early Cambrian represents a methane “burp” which, by raising global temperatures, triggered an increase in diversity. But this hypothesis also fails to explain the increase in disparity.
