= HOXA5 =

Protein-coding gene in humans

Identifiers
- Aliases: HOXA5, HOX1, HOX1.3, HOX1C, homeobox A5
- External IDs: OMIM: 142952; MGI: 96177; GeneCards: HOXA5

Gene location (Human)
Chr.	Chromosome 7 (human)
Band	7p15.2	Start	27,141,052 bp
Band	7p15.2	End	27,143,681 bp

Gene location (Mouse)
Chr.	Chromosome 6 (mouse)
Band	6 B3|6 25.4 cM	Start	52,178,734 bp
Band	6 B3|6 25.4 cM	End	52,181,567 bp
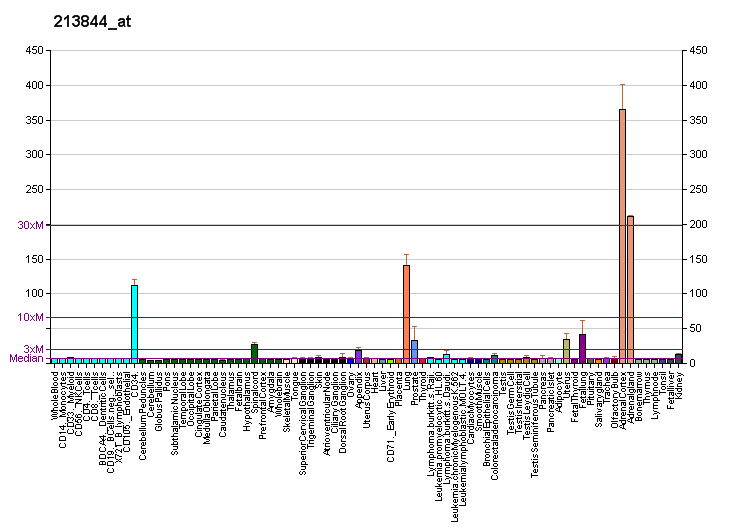
RNA expression pattern
Bgee	Human / Mouse (ortholog); Top expressed in: caput epididymis; corpus epididymis; renal medulla; left uterine tube; adrenal cortex; right adrenal cortex; left adrenal cortex; mucosa of transverse colon; mucosa of ileum; right uterine tube / Top expressed in: axial skeleton; human vertebral column; cervical vertebral column; thoracic vertebral column; efferent ductule; left lung lobe; migratory enteric neural crest cell; rib; right lung lobe; tail of embryo; More reference expression data
BioGPS	More reference expression data
Gene ontology
Molecular function	DNA binding; sequence-specific DNA binding; DNA-binding transcription factor activity; DNA-binding transcription activator activity, RNA polymerase II-specific; RNA polymerase II cis-regulatory region sequence-specific DNA binding; protein binding; DNA-binding transcription factor activity, RNA polymerase II-specific; transcription factor activity, RNA polymerase II distal enhancer sequence-specific binding
Cellular component	nucleus
Biological process	embryonic skeletal system morphogenesis; pattern specification process; skeletal system development; respiratory system process; regulation of transcription, DNA-templated; multicellular organism growth; lung development; trachea morphogenesis; bronchiole development; cell-cell signaling involved in mammary gland development; regulation of mammary gland epithelial cell proliferation; mammary gland alveolus development; lung goblet cell differentiation; transcription, DNA-templated; mammary gland epithelial cell differentiation; negative regulation of erythrocyte differentiation; respiratory gaseous exchange by respiratory system; trachea cartilage morphogenesis; embryonic skeletal system development; morphogenesis of an epithelium; multicellular organism development; thyroid gland development; lobar bronchus epithelium development; mesenchymal-epithelial cell signaling; positive regulation of apoptotic process; intestinal epithelial cell maturation; negative regulation of angiogenesis; cartilage morphogenesis; lung alveolus development; lung-associated mesenchyme development; epithelial tube branching involved in lung morphogenesis; cell migration; positive regulation of myeloid cell differentiation; anterior/posterior pattern specification; positive regulation of transcription by RNA polymerase II; transcription by RNA polymerase II
Sources:Amigo / QuickGO
Orthologs
Databases	NCBI: entry; OMA: entry
Species	Human	Mouse
Entrez	3202	15402
Ensembl	ENSG00000106004	ENSMUSG00000038253
UniProt	P20719	P09021
RefSeq (mRNA)	NM_019102	NM_010453
RefSeq (protein)	NP_061975	NP_034583
Location (UCSC)	Chr 7: 27.14 – 27.14 Mb	Chr 6: 52.18 – 52.18 Mb
PubMed search
- Wikidata
View/Edit Human	View/Edit Mouse

Homeobox protein Hox-A5 is a protein that in humans is encoded by the HOXA5 gene.

== Function ==
In vertebrates, the genes encoding the class of transcription factors called homeobox genes are found in clusters named A, B, C, and D on four separate chromosomes. Expression of these proteins is spatially and temporally regulated during embryonic development. This gene is part of the A cluster on chromosome 7 and encodes a DNA-binding transcription factor which may regulate gene expression, morphogenesis, and differentiation. Methylation of this gene may result in the loss of its expression and, since the encoded protein upregulates the tumor suppressor p53, this protein may play an important role in tumorigenesis.

HoxA5 is controlled, at least in part, by DNA methylation. HoxA5 has been shown to upregulate the tumor suppressor p53 and AKT1 by downregulation of PTEN. Suppression of HoxA5 has been shown to attenuate hemangioma growth. HoxA5 has far-reaching effects on gene expression, causing ~300 genes to become upregulated upon its induction in breast cancer cell lines. HoxA5 protein transduction domain overexpression prevents inflammation shown by inhibition of TNFα-inducible monocyte binding to HUVECs.

Comparison of the HoxA5 promoter methylation profile across cell types from the least differentiated (human embryonic stem cells) to the most endothelial-like (human umbilical vein endothelial cells, or HUVECs) shows that the HoxA5 promoter is normally heavily methylated in non-differentiated cells and becomes demethylated as cells differentiate down the endothelial lineage. HoxA5 contains a C-Amp Response Elements (CRE) in its promoter. POL2 and CTCF binding are enriched at the CpG-dense HoxA5 promoter in HUVECs, demonstrating transcriptional activity.

== Clinical significance ==
HoxA5 is suppressed in acute myeloid leukemia (AML), and the DNMT inhibitor decitabine (5Aza) is used to treat this disease. While HoxA5 is known to be hypermethylated in AML, it has not yet been shown whether decitabine directly targets these genes for demethylation. HOXA5 has also been nominated as an oncogene in glioblastoma.

== See also ==
- Homeobox
