= HOXC8 =

Protein-coding gene in the species Homo sapiens

Identifiers
- Aliases: HOXC8, HOX3, HOX3A, homeobox C8
- External IDs: OMIM: 142970; MGI: 96198; GeneCards: HOXC8

Gene location (Human)
Chr.	Chromosome 12 (human)
Band	12q13.13	Start	54,008,985 bp
Band	12q13.13	End	54,012,769 bp
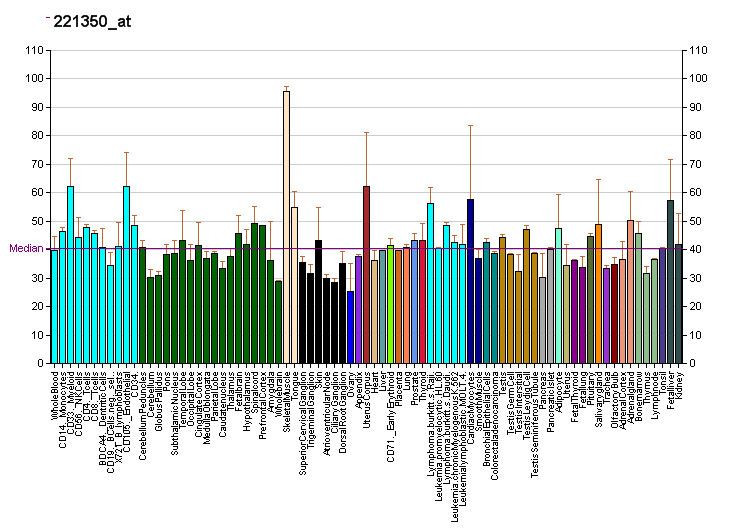
RNA expression pattern
Bgee	Human / Mouse (ortholog); Top expressed in: sural nerve; gastrocnemius muscle; gonad; testicle; left uterine tube; muscle of thigh; subcutaneous adipose tissue; popliteal artery; tibial arteries; skeletal muscle tissue / n/a; More reference expression data
BioGPS	More reference expression data
Gene ontology
Molecular function	DNA-binding transcription factor activity; sequence-specific DNA binding; DNA binding; DNA-binding transcription factor activity, RNA polymerase II-specific
Cellular component	microtubule cytoskeleton; nucleus; nucleoplasm
Biological process	multicellular organism development; skeletal system morphogenesis; regulation of transcription, DNA-templated; negative regulation of transcription by RNA polymerase II; transcription, DNA-templated; anterior/posterior pattern specification; neuron differentiation
Sources:Amigo / QuickGO
Orthologs
Databases	NCBI: entry; OMA: entry
Species	Human	Mouse
Entrez	3224	15426
Ensembl	ENSG00000037965	n/a
UniProt	P31273	P09025
RefSeq (mRNA)	NM_022658	NM_010466
RefSeq (protein)	NP_073149	NP_034596
Location (UCSC)	Chr 12: 54.01 – 54.01 Mb	n/a
PubMed search
- Wikidata
View/Edit Human	View/Edit Mouse

Homeobox protein Hox-C8 is a protein that in humans is encoded by the HOXC8 gene.

== Function ==
This gene belongs to the homeobox family of genes. The homeobox genes encode a highly conserved family of transcription factors that play an important role in morphogenesis in all multicellular organisms. Mammals possess four similar homeobox gene clusters, HOXA, HOXB, HOXC and HOXD, which are located on different chromosomes and consist of 9 to 11 genes arranged in tandem. This gene is one of several homeobox HOXC genes located in a cluster on chromosome 12. The product of this gene may play a role in the regulation of cartilage differentiation. It could also be involved in chondrodysplasias or other cartilage disorders. HOXC8 was found to have activity in promoting nerve growth and its expression is dysregulated in patients with neurofibromatosis type 1.

== See also ==
- Homeobox

== Interactions ==
HOXC8 has been shown to interact with Mothers against decapentaplegic homolog 6 and Mothers against decapentaplegic homolog 1.
