= HOXC9 =

Protein-coding gene in the species Homo sapiens

Identifiers
- Aliases: HOXC9, HOX3, HOX3B, homeobox C9
- External IDs: OMIM: 142971; MGI: 96199; GeneCards: HOXC9
Available structures
| PDB | Ortholog search: PDBe RCSB |
| PDB | List of PDB id codes 2LP0, 2MSY |

Gene location (Human)
| Chr. | Chromosome 12 (human) |
| Band | 12q13.13 | Start | 53,994,895 bp |
| Band | 12q13.13 | End | 54,003,337 bp |

Gene location (Mouse)
| Chr. | Chromosome 15 (mouse) |
| Band | 15 F3|15 58.04 cM | Start | 102,884,874 bp |
| Band | 15 F3|15 58.04 cM | End | 102,893,531 bp |
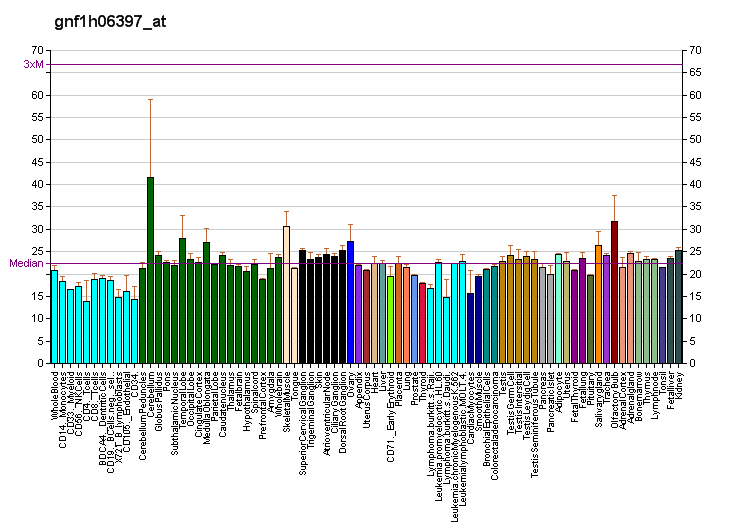
RNA expression pattern
| Bgee | Human / Mouse (ortholog); Top expressed in: Achilles tendon; gastrocnemius muscle; testicle; gonad; vastus lateralis muscle; subcutaneous adipose tissue; tibialis anterior muscle; popliteal artery; tibial arteries; skin of leg / Top expressed in: tail of embryo; female urethra; ankle joint; extensor digitorum longus muscle; plantaris muscle; muscle of thigh; serosa of urinary bladder; quadriceps femoris muscle; soleus muscle; epithelium of female urethra; More reference expression data |
| BioGPS | More reference expression data |
Gene ontology
| Molecular function | sequence-specific DNA binding; DNA binding; protein binding; DNA-binding transcription factor activity, RNA polymerase II-specific |
| Cellular component | nucleus; nucleoplasm; aggresome |
| Biological process | embryonic skeletal system morphogenesis; multicellular organism development; regulation of transcription, DNA-templated; transcription, DNA-templated; anterior/posterior pattern specification; embryonic skeletal system development; regulation of transcription by RNA polymerase II |
Sources:Amigo / QuickGO
Orthologs
| Databases | NCBI: entry; OMA: entry |
| Species | Human | Mouse |
| Entrez | 3225 | 15427 |
| Ensembl | ENSG00000180806 | ENSMUSG00000036139 |
| UniProt | P31274 | P09633 |
| RefSeq (mRNA) | NM_006897 | NM_008272 |
| RefSeq (protein) | NP_008828 | NP_032298 |
| Location (UCSC) | Chr 12: 53.99 – 54 Mb | Chr 15: 102.88 – 102.89 Mb |
| PubMed search |
- Wikidata
| View/Edit Human | View/Edit Mouse |

Homeobox protein Hox-C9 is a protein that in humans is encoded by the HOXC9 gene.

== Function ==
This gene belongs to the homeobox family of genes. The homeobox genes encode a highly conserved family of transcription factors that play an important role in morphogenesis in all multicellular organisms. Mammals possess four similar homeobox gene clusters, HOXA, HOXB, HOXC and HOXD, which are located on different chromosomes and consist of 9 to 11 genes arranged in tandem. This gene is one of several homeobox HOXC genes located in a cluster on chromosome 12.

== See also ==
- Homeobox
