= Nuclear protein =

Proteins found in the cell nucleus

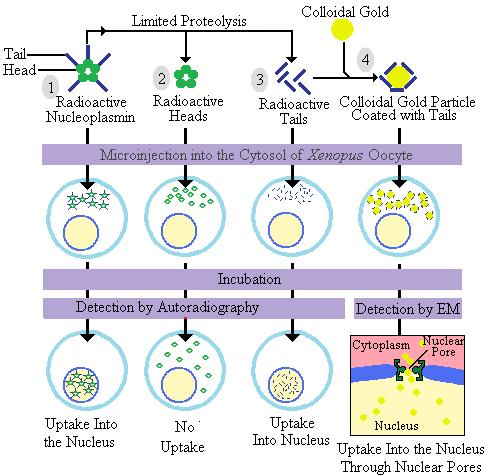
Diagram of nuclear uptake of proteins

A nuclear protein is a protein found in the cell nucleus. Proteins are transported inside the nucleus with they help of the nuclear pore complex, which acts a barrier between cytoplasm and nuclear membrane. Many nuclear proteins contain positively charged amino acids such as lysine and arginine which acts as a signal to allow the protein to get transported into the nucleus while maintaining their fold. The import and export of proteins through the nuclear pore complex plays a fundamental role in gene regulation and other biological functions.

The Nuclear Protein Database (NPD) is a database of around 1,000 proteins localized to the vertebrate cell nucleus. Proteins are searchable by name, motif, nuclear compartment or a keyword term.
