= Gene cluster =

Group of related genes in genomic DNA

A gene cluster is a group of two or more genes found within an organism's DNA that encode similar polypeptides or proteins which collectively share a generalized function and are often located within a few thousand base pairs of each other. The size of gene clusters can vary significantly, from a few genes to several hundred genes. Portions of the DNA sequence of each gene within a gene cluster are found to be identical; however, the protein encoded by each gene is distinct from the proteins encoded by the other genes within the cluster. Gene clusters often result from expansions of a single gene caused by repeated duplication events, and may be observed near one another on the same chromosome or on different, but homologous chromosomes. An example of a gene cluster is the Hox gene, which is made up of eight genes and is part of the Homeobox gene family.

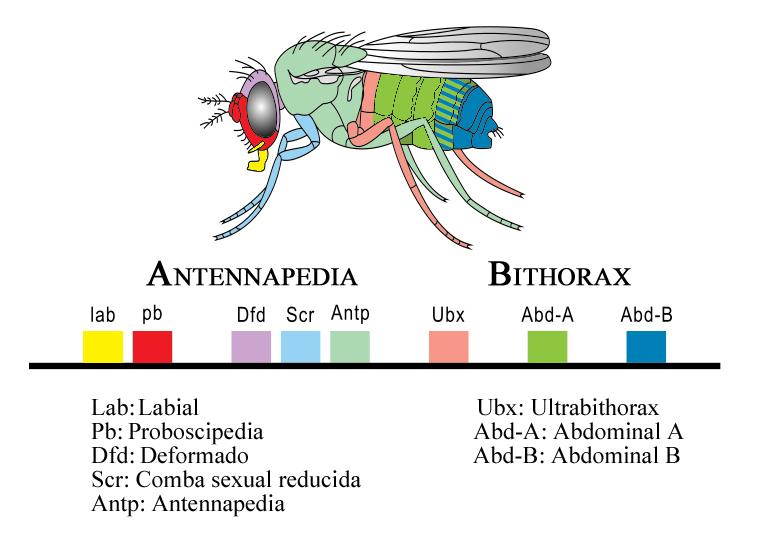
Hox genes have been observed among various phylum. Eight genes make up the Hox gene Drosophila. The number of Hox genes may vary among organisms, but the Hox genes collectively make up the Homeobox family.

== Formation ==
Historically, four models have been proposed for the formation and persistence of gene clusters.

=== Gene duplication and divergence ===
This model has been generally accepted since the mid-1970s. It postulates that gene clusters were formed as a result of gene duplication and divergence. These gene clusters include the Hox gene cluster, the human β-globin gene cluster, and four clustered human growth hormone (hGH)/chorionic somatomammotropin genes.

Conserved gene clusters, such as Hox and the human β-globin gene cluster, may be formed as a result of the process of gene duplication and divergence. A gene is duplicated during cell division, so that its descendants have two end-to-end copies of the gene where it had one copy, initially coding for the same protein or otherwise having the same function. In the course of subsequent evolution, they diverge, so that the products they code for have different but related functions, with the genes still being adjacent on the chromosome. Ohno theorized that the origin of new genes during evolution was dependent on gene duplication. If only a single copy of a gene existed in the genome of a species, the proteins transcribed from this gene would be essential to their survival. Because there was only a single copy of the gene, they could not undergo mutations which would potentially result in new genes; however, gene duplication allows essential genes to undergo mutations in the duplicated copy, which would ultimately give rise to new genes over the course of evolution.

Mutations in the duplicated copy were tolerated because the original copy contained genetic information for the essential gene's function. Species who have gene clusters have a selective evolutionary advantage because natural selection must keep the genes together. Over a short span of time, the new genetic information exhibited by the duplicated copy of the essential gene would not serve a practical advantage; however, over a long, evolutionary time period, the genetic information in the duplicated copy may undergo additional and drastic mutations in which the proteins of the duplicated gene served a different role than those of the original essential gene. Over the long, evolutionary time period, the two similar genes would diverge so the proteins of each gene were unique in their functions. Hox gene clusters, ranging in various sizes, are found among several phyla.

==== Hox cluster ====
When gene duplication occurs to produce a gene cluster, one or multiple genes may be duplicated at once. In the case of the Hox gene, a shared ancestral ProtoHox cluster was duplicated, resulting in genetic clusters in the Hox gene as well as the ParaHox gene, an evolutionary sister complex of the Hox gene. It is unknown the exact number of genes contained in the duplicated Protohox cluster; however, models exist suggesting that the duplicated Protohox cluster originally contained four, three, or two genes.

In the case where a gene cluster is duplicated, some genes may be lost. Loss of genes is dependent of the number of genes originating in the gene cluster. In the four gene model, the ProtoHox cluster contained four genes which resulted in two twin clusters: the Hox cluster and the ParaHox cluster. As its name indicates, the two gene model gave rise to the Hox cluster and the ParaHox cluster as a result of the ProtoHox cluster which contained only two genes. The three gene model was originally proposed in conjunction with the four gene model; however, rather than the Hox cluster and the ParaHox cluster resulting from a cluster containing three genes, the Hox cluster and ParaHox cluster were as a result of single gene tandem duplication, identical genes found adjacent on the same chromosome. This was independent of duplication of the ancestral ProtoHox cluster.

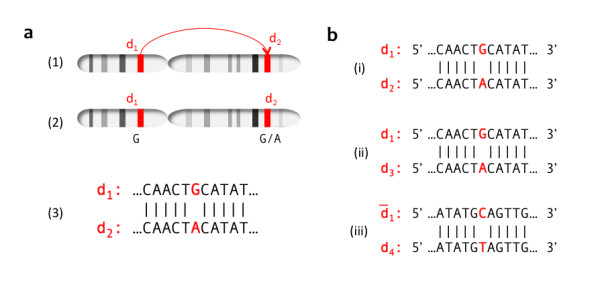
Intrachromosomal duplication is the duplication of genes within the same chromosome over the course of evolution (a-1). Mutations may occur in the duplicated copy, such as observed with the substitution of guanine with adenine (a-2). Alignment of DNA sequences exhibits homology between the two chromosomes (a-3). All segments were duplicated from the same ancestral DNA sequence as observed by the comparisons in b(i-iii).

==== Cis vs. trans duplication ====
Gene duplication may occur via cis-duplication or trans duplication. Cis-duplication, or intrachromosomal duplication, entails the duplication of genes within the same chromosome whereas trans duplication, or interchromosomal duplication, consists of duplicating genes on neighboring but separate chromosomes. The formations of the Hox cluster and of the ParaHox cluster were results of intrachromosomal duplication, although they were initially thought to be interchromosomal.

=== Fisher Model ===
The Fisher Model was proposed in 1930 by Ronald Fisher. Under the Fisher Model, gene clusters are a result of two alleles working well with one another. In other words, gene clusters may exhibit co-adaptation. The Fisher Model was considered unlikely and later dismissed as an explanation for gene cluster formation.

=== Coregulation Model ===
Under the coregulation model, genes are organized into clusters, each consisting of a single promoter and a cluster of coding sequences, which are therefore co-regulated, showing coordinated gene expression. Coordinated gene expression was once considered to be the most common mechanism driving the formation of gene clusters. However coregulation and thus coordinated gene expression cannot drive the formation of gene clusters.

=== Molarity Model ===
The Molarity Model considers the constraints of cell size. Transcribing and translating genes together is beneficial to the cell. thus the formation of clustered genes generates a high local concentration of cytoplasmic protein products. Spatial segregation of protein products has been observed in bacteria; however, the Molarity Model does not consider co-transcription or distribution of genes found within an operon.

== Gene clusters vs. tandem arrays ==
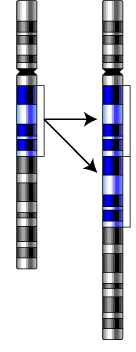
Tandem duplication is the process in which one gene is duplicated and the resulting copy is found adjacent to the original gene. Tandemly arrayed genes are formed as a result of tandem duplications.

Repeated genes can occur in two major patterns: gene clusters and tandem arrays, or formerly called tandemly arrayed genes. Although similar, gene clusters and tandemly arrayed genes may be distinguished from one another.

=== Gene Clusters ===
Gene clusters are found to be close to one another when observed on the same chromosome. They are dispersed randomly; however, gene clusters are normally within, at most, a few thousand bases of each other. The distance between each gene in the gene cluster can vary. The DNA found between each repeated gene in the gene cluster is non-conserved. Portions of the DNA sequence of a gene is found to be identical in genes contained in a gene cluster. Gene conversion is the only method in which gene clusters may become homogenized. Although the size of a gene cluster may vary, it rarely comprises more than 50 genes, making clusters stable in number. Gene clusters change over a long evolutionary time period, which does not result in genetic complexity.

=== Tandem arrays ===
Tandem arrays are a group of genes with the same or similar function that are repeated consecutively without space between each gene. The genes are organized in the same orientation. Unlike gene clusters, tandemly arrayed genes are found to consist of consecutive, identical repeats, separated only by a nontranscribed spacer region.

While the genes contained in a gene cluster encode for similar proteins, identical proteins or functional RNAs are encoded by tandemly arrayed genes. Unequal recombination, which changes the number of repeats by placing duplicated genes next to the original gene. Unlike gene clusters, tandemly arrayed genes rapidly change in response to the needs of the environment, causing an increase in genetic complexity.

Gene conversion allows tandemly arrayed genes to become homogenized, or identical. Gene conversion may be allelic or ectopic. Allelic gene conversion occurs when one allele of a gene is converted to the other allele as a result of mismatch base pairing during meiosis homologous recombination. Ectopic gene conversion occurs when one homologous DNA sequence is replaced by another. Ectopic gene conversion is the driving force for concerted evolution of gene families.

Tandemly arrayed genes are essential to maintain large gene families, such as ribosomal RNA. In the eukaryotic genome, tandemly arrayed genes make up ribosomal RNA. Tandemly repeated rRNAs are essential to maintain the RNA transcript. One RNA gene may not be able to provide a sufficient amount of RNA. In this situation, tandem repeats of the gene allow a sufficient amount of RNA to be provided. For example, human embryonic cells contain 5-10 million ribosomes and double in number within 24 hours. In order to provide a substantive number of ribosomes, multiple RNA polymerases must consecutively transcribe multiple rRNA genes.
