= Antennapedia =

Hox gene

Homeotic protein antennapedia

Identifiers
- Organism: Drosophila melanogaster
- Symbol: antp
- UniProt: P02833
Search for
- Structures: Swiss-model
- Domains: InterPro

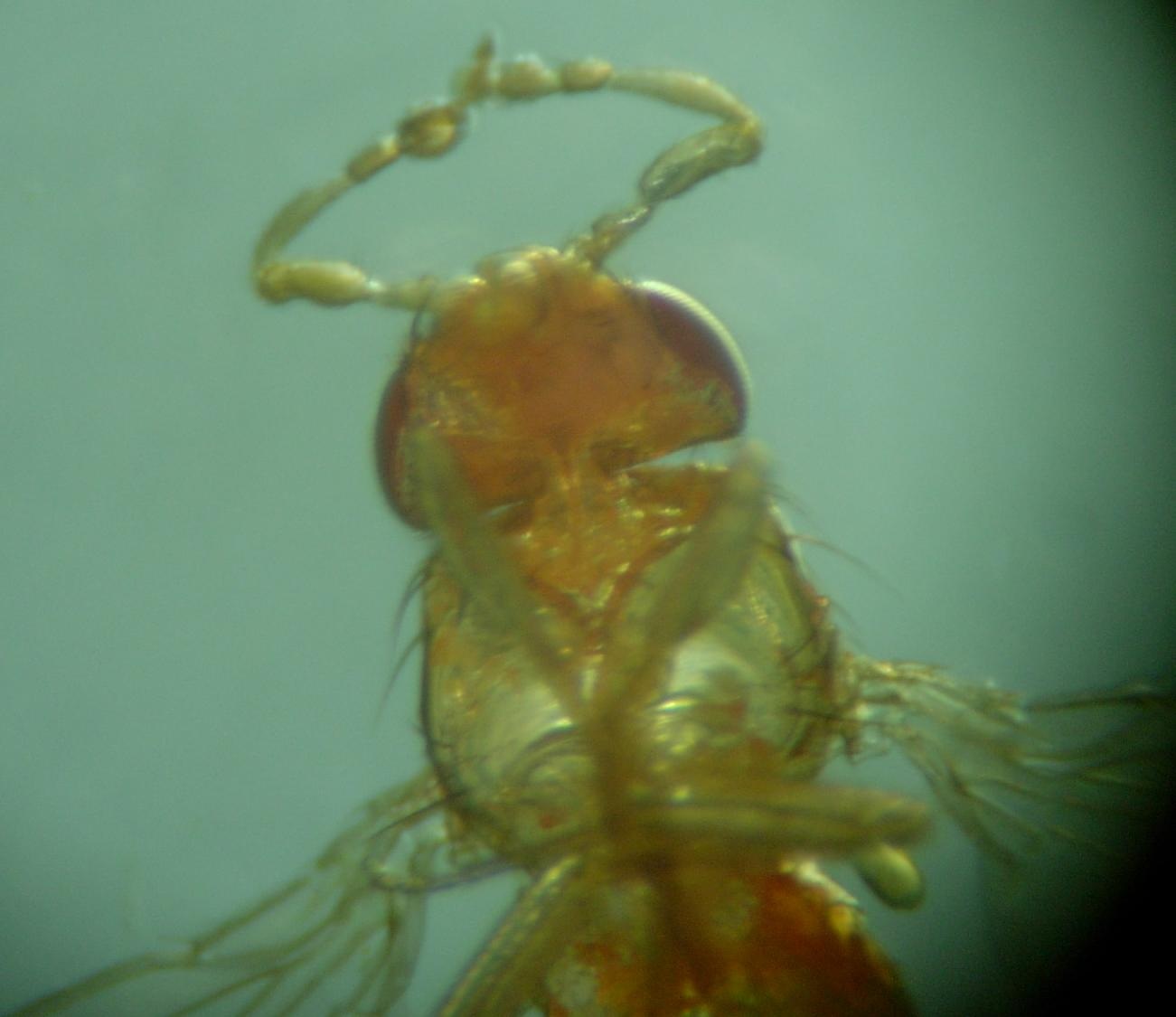
Fly with legs in place of antennae, caused by Antennapedia mutation

The layout of HOX genes in fruit flies

Antennapedia (abbreviated Antp) is a Hox gene first discovered in Drosophila which controls the formation of legs during development. Loss-of-function mutations in the regulatory region of this gene result in the development of the second leg pair into ectopic antennae. By contrast gain-of-function alleles convert antennae into ectopic legs.

This is just one illustration of the tendency of organisms to exhibit variations on a theme: modulated repetition. Legs and antennae are related to one another as much as molars are to incisors, fingers are to toes, and arms are to legs.

Antp also refers to a gene complex (ANT-C) in Drosophila ending with the Antp gene. It is responsible for formation and differentiation of the thoracic and head segments of the fly's body.

== Origin of Antennapedia-class homeobox gene ==
The origin of the ancestor homeobox gene is an important aspect of the evolution of the Antp-class Hox genes. Early evolution of the Antp-class genes may have predated the divergence of cnidarians. However, the role that Antp plays in the spatial body development of cnidarians remains unclear. A widely accepted theory is that the ancestor Hox cluster containing three genes arose in the early metazoan era. It is suggested that Antennapedia arose from Evx, a non-Hox family of genes. This duplication event of Evx into the Antp-class probably occurred prior to cnidarian divergence, as there are Cnidarians with Evx and without Hox class genes and vice versa.

== Antennapedia in arachnids ==
Recent studies have observed that loss of function mutations within the Antp gene in Parasteatoda tepidariorum leads to the development of a pair of ectopic legs, resulting in 10-legged mutant spiders. Drosophila Antp is thought to play an important role in the role of ectopic leg or antenna placement, but not in abdominal leg suppression. However, recent research supported that leg suppression was indeed performed by Antp in arachnids. This suggests that spiders and insects may have separately developed strategies of the leg suppression via the evolutionary pressure of convergence. Arachnids' Antp gene is different from other Antp Hox clusters, suggesting that it has evolved via a divergence event leading to the development on the leg suppression function. This example suggests how the functions of homeobox genes including Antp have evolved over time to account for different lineages' needs.

== HoxC6: an ortholog of Antp ==
Although it is known that Antp-class homeobox genes play some sort of role in transcriptional processes, not all of their actions and functions have been discovered. Recent studies observed Antp and the Hox ortholog HoxC6 in Xenopus in order to further distinguish the evolution of these orthologues. HoxC6 was found to play an important role in gastrulation in the vertebrate Xenopus. However, gastrulation was also a target in the Drosophila Antp gene. The anterior–posterior pattern mechanism is highly conserved in these genes, as its function in Xenopus is clear, but it is unclear why it would be a target in Drosophila. The similarities continuously observed between Hox genes in vertebrates and Drosophila suggests a complex evolutionary history of the Antp Hox gene cluster, as well as reaffirms the importance of the conservation of this gene cluster in the evolution of body morphology.
