= Acute lymphoblastic leukemia =

Blood cancer characterized by overproduction of lymphoblasts

- Other names: Acute lymphocytic leukemia, acute lymphoid leukemia
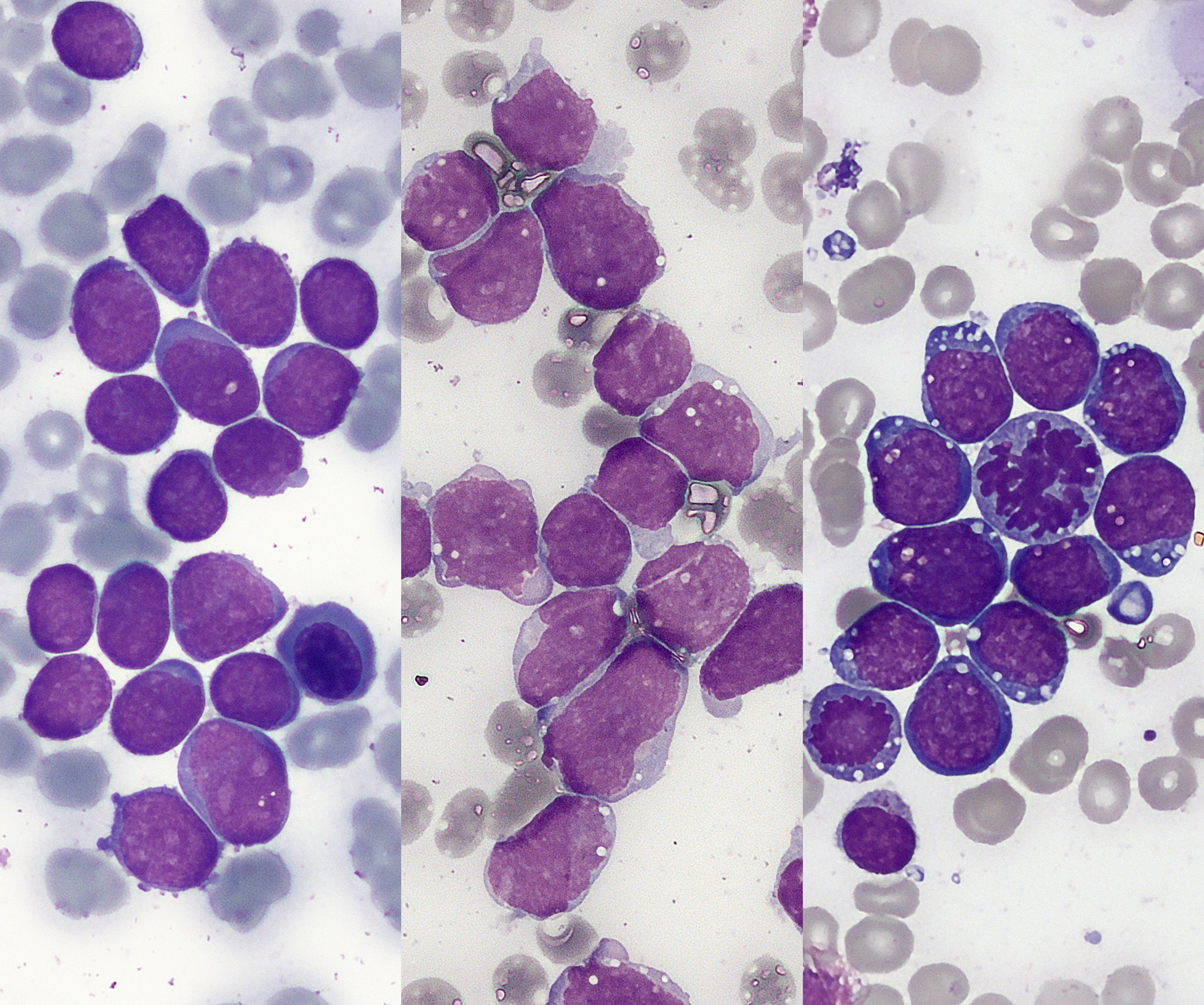
- Left to right: L1, L2, L3 morphological types of acute lymphoblastic leukemias
- Specialty: Hematology, oncology
- Symptoms: Feeling tired, pale color, fever, easy bleeding or bruising, bone pain, enlarged lymph nodes
- Complications: Infection, tumor lysis syndrome
- Usual onset: 2–5 years old
- Types: B-cell ALL, T-cell ALL
- Causes: Usually unknown
- Risk factors: Identical twin with ALL, Down syndrome, Fanconi anemia, ataxia telangiectasia, Klinefelter syndrome, high birth weight, significant radiation exposure
- Diagnostic method: Blood tests and bone marrow examination
- Differential diagnosis: Infectious mononucleosis, acute myeloid leukemia, lymphoblastic lymphoma, aplastic anemia
- Treatment: Chemotherapy, stem cell transplantation, radiation therapy, targeted therapy
- Prognosis: Children: 90% five-year survival rate Adults: 35% five-year survival
- Frequency: 1 in 1,750 children
- Deaths: 111,000 (2015)

Acute lymphoblastic leukemia (ALL) is a cancer of the lymphoid line of blood cells characterized by the development of large numbers of immature lymphocytes. Symptoms may include feeling tired, pale skin color, fever, easy bleeding or bruising, enlarged lymph nodes, or bone pain. As an acute leukemia, ALL progresses rapidly and is typically fatal within weeks or months if left untreated.

In most cases, the cause is unknown. Genetic risk factors may include Down syndrome, Li–Fraumeni syndrome, or neurofibromatosis type 1. Environmental risk factors may include significant radiation exposure or prior chemotherapy. Evidence regarding electromagnetic fields or pesticides is unclear. Some hypothesize that an abnormal immune response to a common infection may be a trigger. The underlying mechanism involves multiple genetic mutations that results in rapid cell division. The excessive immature lymphocytes in the bone marrow interfere with the production of new red blood cells, white blood cells, and platelets. Diagnosis is typically based on blood tests and bone marrow examination.

Acute lymphoblastic leukemia is typically treated initially with chemotherapy aimed at bringing about remission. This is then followed by further chemotherapy, typically over some years. Treatment usually also includes intrathecal chemotherapy since systemic chemotherapy can have limited penetration into the central nervous system, and the central nervous system is a common site for relapse of acute lymphoblastic leukemia.

Treatment can also include radiation therapy if ALL has spread to the brain. Stem cell transplantation may be used if the disease recurs following standard treatment. Additional treatments such as Chimeric antigen receptor T cell immunotherapy are being used and further studied.

Acute lymphoblastic leukemia affected about 876,000 people globally in 2015 and resulted in about 111,000 deaths. It occurs most commonly in children, particularly those between the ages of two and five. In the United States it is the most common cause of cancer and death from cancer among children. Acute lymphoblastic leukemia is notable for being the first disseminated cancer to be cured. Survival for children increased from under 10% in the 1960s to 90% in 2015. Survival rates remain lower for babies (50%) and adults (35%).

== Signs and symptoms ==
Initial symptoms can be nonspecific, particularly in children. Over 50% of children with leukemia had one or more of five features: a liver one can feel (64%), a spleen one can feel (61%), pale complexion (54%), fever (53%), and bruising (52%). Additionally, recurrent infections, feeling tired, arm or leg pain, and enlarged lymph nodes can be prominent features. The B symptoms, such as fever, night sweats, and weight loss, are often present as well.

Central nervous system (CNS) symptoms such as cranial neuropathies due to meningeal infiltration are identified in less than 10% of adults and less than 5% of children, particularly mature B-cell ALL (Burkitt leukemia) at presentation.

The signs and symptoms of acute lymphoblastic leukemia are variable and include:

- Generalized weakness and feeling tired
- Anemia
- Dizziness
- Headache, vomiting, lethargy, neck stiffness, or cranial nerve palsies (CNS involvement)
- Frequent or unexplained fever and infection
- Weight loss and/or loss of appetite
- Excessive and unexplained bruising
- Bone pain, joint pain (caused by the spread of "blast" cells to the surface of the bone or into the joint from the marrow cavity)
- Breathlessness
- Enlarged lymph nodes, liver, and/or spleen
- Pitting edema (swelling) in the lower limbs and/or abdomen
- Petechiae, which are tiny red spots or lines in the skin due to low platelet levels
- Testicular enlargement
- Mediastinal mass

== Cause ==
In acute lymphoblastic leukemia, lymphoid cell development stops at the lymphoblast (arrow), which are also overproduced.

The cancerous cell in ALL is the lymphoblast. Normal lymphoblasts develop into mature, infection-fighting B-cells or T-cells, also called lymphocytes. Signals in the body control the number of lymphocytes so neither too few nor too many are made. In ALL, the normal development of some lymphocytes and the control over the number of lymphoid cells become defective.

ALL emerges when a single lymphoblast gains many mutations to genes that affect blood cell development and proliferation. In childhood ALL, this process begins at conception with the inheritance of some of these genes. These genes, in turn, increase the risk that more mutations will occur in developing lymphoid cells. Certain genetic syndromes, like Down Syndrome, have the same effect. Environmental risk factors are also needed to help create enough genetic mutations to cause disease. Evidence for the role of the environment is seen in childhood ALL among twins, where only 10–15% of both genetically identical twins get ALL. Since they have the same genes, different environmental exposures explain why one twin gets ALL, and the other does not.

Infant ALL is a rare variant that occurs in babies under one year of age. KMT2A (formerly MLL) gene rearrangements are most common and happen in the embryo or fetus before birth. These rearrangements result in increased expression of blood cell development genes by promoting gene transcription and through epigenetic changes. In contrast to childhood ALL, environmental factors are not thought to play a significant role. Aside from the KMT2A rearrangement, only one extra mutation is typically found. Environmental exposures are not needed to help create more mutations.

=== Risk factors ===
==== Genetics ====
Common inherited risk factors include mutations in ARID5B, CDKN2A/2B, CEBPE, IKZF1, GATA3, PIP4K2A and, more rarely, TP53. These genes play important roles in cellular development, proliferation, and differentiation. Individually, most of these mutations are low risk for ALL. A significant risk of disease occurs when a person inherits several of these mutations together.

The uneven distribution of genetic risk factors may help explain differences in disease rates among ethnic groups. For instance, the ARID5B mutation is less common in ethnic African populations.

Several genetic syndromes also carry an increased risk of ALL. These include: Down syndrome, Fanconi anemia, Bloom syndrome, X-linked agammaglobulinemia, severe combined immunodeficiency, Shwachman–Diamond syndrome, Kostmann syndrome, neurofibromatosis type 1, ataxia-telangiectasia, paroxysmal nocturnal hemoglobinuria, and Li–Fraumeni syndrome. Fewer than 5% of cases are associated with a known genetic syndrome.

Rare mutations in ETV6 and PAX5 are associated with a familial form of ALL with autosomal dominant patterns of inheritance.

==== Environmental ====
The environmental exposures that contribute to the emergence of ALL are contentious and a subject of ongoing debate.

High levels of radiation exposure from nuclear fallout are a known risk factor for developing leukemia. Evidence whether lesser radiation, as from x-ray imaging during pregnancy, increases the risk of disease remains inconclusive. Studies that have identified an association between x-ray imaging during pregnancy and ALL found only a slightly increased risk. Exposure to strong electromagnetic radiation from power lines has also been associated with a slightly increased ALL risk. This result is questioned as no causal mechanism linking electromagnetic radiation with cancer is known.

High birth weight (greater than 4000 g or 8.8 lbs) is also associated with a small increased risk. The mechanism connecting high birth weight to ALL is also unknown.

Evidence suggests that secondary leukemia can develop in individuals treated with certain types of chemotherapy, such as epipodophyllotoxins and cyclophosphamide.

==== Infections ====
There is some evidence that a common infection, such as influenza, may indirectly promote the emergence of ALL. The delayed-infection hypothesis states that ALL results from an abnormal immune response to infection in a person with genetic risk factors. Delayed development of the immune system due to limited disease exposure may result in excessive production of lymphocytes and increased mutation rate during an illness. Several studies have identified lower ALL rates among children with greater exposure to illness early in life. Very young children who attend daycare have lower rates of ALL. Evidence from many other studies looking at disease exposure and ALL is inconclusive. Some researchers have linked the hygiene hypothesis.

== Mechanism ==
Several characteristic genetic changes lead to the creation of a leukemic lymphoblast. These changes include chromosomal translocations, intrachromosomal rearrangements, changes in the number of chromosomes in leukemic cells, and additional mutations in individual genes. Chromosomal translocations involve moving a large region of DNA from one chromosome to another. This move can result in placing a gene from one chromosome that promotes cell division to a more actively transcribed area on another chromosome. The result is a cell that divides more often. An example of this includes the translocation of C-MYC, a gene that encodes a transcription factor that leads to increased cell division, next to the immunoglobulin heavy- or light-chain gene enhancers, leading to increased C-MYC expression and increased cell division. Other large changes in chromosomal structure can result in the placement of two genes directly next to each other. The result is the combination of two usually separate proteins into a new fusion protein. This protein can have a new function that promotes cancer development. Examples of this include the ETV6–RUNX1 fusion gene that combines two factors that promote blood cell development and the BCR-ABL1 fusion gene of the Philadelphia chromosome. BCR–ABL1 encodes an always-activated tyrosine kinase that causes frequent cell division. These mutations produce a cell that divides more often, even in the absence of growth factors.

Other genetic changes in B-cell ALL include changes in the number of chromosomes within the leukemic cells. Gaining at least five additional chromosomes, called high hyperdiploidy, occurs more commonly. Less often, chromosomes are lost, called hypodiploidy, which is associated with a poorer prognosis. Additional common genetic changes in B-cell ALL involve non-inherited mutations to PAX5 and IKZF1. In T-cell ALL, LYL1, TAL1, TLX1, and TLX3 rearrangements can occur.

Acute lymphoblastic leukemia results when enough of these genetic changes are present in a single lymphoblast. In childhood ALL, for example, one fusion gene translocation is often found along with six to eight other ALL-related genetic changes. The initial leukemic lymphoblast copies itself into an excessive number of new lymphoblasts, none of which can develop into functioning lymphocytes. These lymphoblasts build up in the bone marrow and may spread to other sites in the body, such as lymph nodes, the mediastinum, the spleen, the testicles, and the brain, leading to the common symptoms of the disease.

== Diagnosis ==
Diagnosing ALL begins with a thorough medical history, physical examination, complete blood count, and blood smears. While many symptoms of ALL can be found in common illnesses, persistent or unexplained symptoms raise suspicion of cancer. Because many features on the medical history and examination are not specific to ALL, further testing is often needed. A large number of white blood cells and lymphoblasts in the circulating blood can be suspicious for ALL because they indicate a rapid production of lymphoid cells in the marrow. The higher these numbers, typically point to a worse prognosis. While white blood cell counts at initial presentation can vary significantly, circulating lymphoblast cells are seen on peripheral blood smears in the majority of cases.

A bone marrow biopsy provides conclusive proof of ALL, typically with >20% of all cells being leukemic lymphoblasts. A lumbar puncture (also known as a spinal tap) can determine whether the spinal column and brain have been invaded. Brain and spinal column involvement can be diagnosed either through confirmation of leukemic cells in the lumbar puncture or through clinical signs of CNS leukemia as described above. Laboratory tests that might show abnormalities include blood count, kidney function, electrolyte, and liver enzyme tests.

Pathological examination, cytogenetics (in particular the presence of Philadelphia chromosome), and immunophenotyping establish whether the leukemic cells are myeloblastic (neutrophils, eosinophils, or basophils) or lymphoblastic (B lymphocytes or T lymphocytes). Cytogenetic testing on marrow samples can help classify the disease and predict its aggression. Different mutations have been associated with shorter or longer survival. Immunohistochemical testing may reveal TdT or CALLA antigens on the surface of leukemic cells. TdT is a protein expressed early in the development of pre-T and pre-B cells, whereas CALLA is an antigen found in 80% of ALL cases and also in the "blast crisis" of CML.

Medical imaging (such as ultrasound or CT scanning) can find invasion of other organs, commonly the lungs, liver, spleen, lymph nodes, brain, kidneys, and reproductive organs.

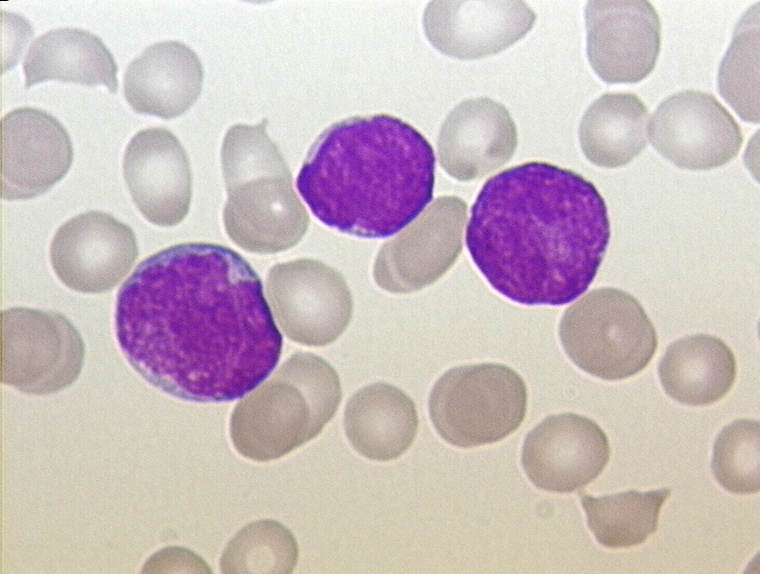
Acute lymphoblastic leukemia (ALL), peripheral blood of a child, Pappenheim stain, magnification x100

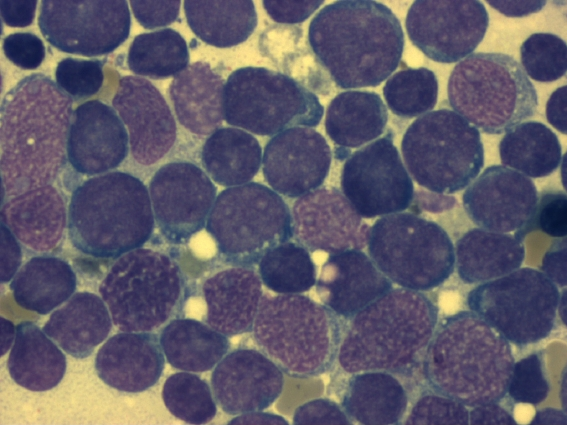
Bone marrow smear (large magnification) from a person with ALL

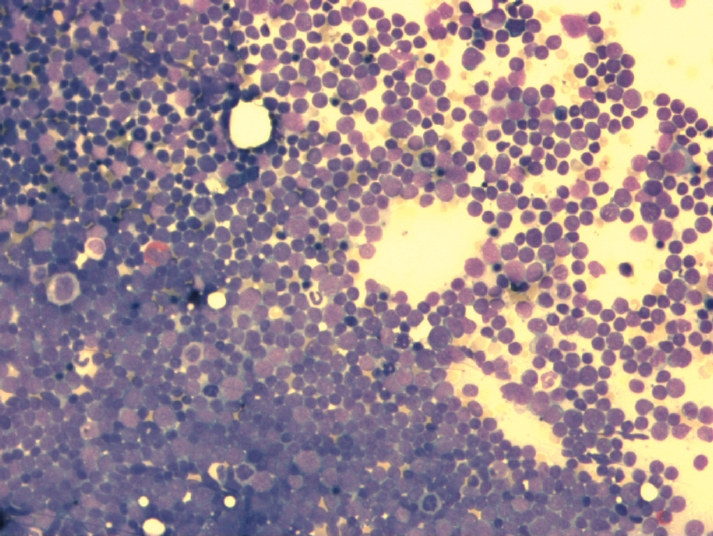
Bone marrow smear from a person with ALL

=== Immunophenotyping ===
In addition to cell morphology and cytogenetics, immunophenotyping, a laboratory technique that identifies cell-surface proteins, is a key component in the diagnosis of ALL. The preferred method of immunophenotyping is through flow cytometry. In malignant lymphoblasts of ALL, expression of terminal deoxynucleotidyl transferase (TdT) on the cell surface can help differentiate malignant lymphocyte cells from reactive lymphocytes, white blood cells that are reacting normally to an infection in the body. On the other hand, myeloperoxidase (MPO), a marker for the myeloid lineage, is typically not expressed. Because precursor B cells and precursor T cells look the same, immunophenotyping can help differentiate the subtype of ALL and the maturity level of the malignant white blood cells. The subtypes of ALL are determined by immunophenotype and maturation stages.

B cell lineage	T cell lineage
pre-pre-B ALL (pro-B-ALL)	precursor T- ALL
common ALL	mature T-cell ALL
pre-B ALL	
mature B-cell ALL (Burkitt leukemia – FAB L3)	

An extensive panel of monoclonal antibodies to cell surface markers, particularly CD or cluster of differentiation markers, is used to classify cells by lineage. Below are immunological markers associated with B-cell and T-cell ALL.

Immunological markers	B cell Lineage	T cell Lineage
B cell lineage
CD19, CD22, CD79a	+	−
CD10	− or + (common ALL)	
cytoplasmic Ig	− or + (pre-B ALL)	
surface Ig	− or + (mature B-cell ALL)	
TdT	+	+
T cell lineage
CD2, CD3, CD4, CD5, CD7, CD8	−	+
TdT	+	+

=== Cytogenetics ===
Cytogenetic analysis has shown different proportions and frequencies of genetic abnormalities in cases of ALL from different age groups. This information is particularly valuable for classification and can, in part, explain the different prognoses of these groups. In regard to genetic analysis, cases can be stratified according to ploidy, the number of sets of chromosomes in the cell, and specific genetic abnormalities, such as translocations. Hyperdiploid cells are defined as cells with more than 50 chromosomes, while hypodiploid cells are defined as cells with fewer than 44 chromosomes. Hyperdiploid cases tend to carry a good prognosis, while hypodiploid cases do not. For example, the most common specific abnormality in childhood B-ALL is the t(12;21) ETV6–RUNX1 translocation, in which the RUNX1 gene, encoding a protein involved in transcriptional control of hemopoiesis, has been translocated and repressed by the ETV6–RUNX1 fusion protein.

Below is a table with the frequencies of some cytogenetic translocations and molecular genetic abnormalities in ALL.

Cytogenetic translocation	Molecular genetic abnormality	%
cryptic t(12;21)	TEL–AML1 fusion	25.4%
t(1;19)(q23;p13)	E2A–PBX (PBX1) fusion	4.8%
t(9;22)(q34;q11)	BCR-ABL fusion(P185)	1.6%
t(4;11)(q21;q23)	MLL–AF4 fusion	1.6%
t(8;14)(q24;q32)	IGH–MYC fusion	
t(11;14)(p13;q11)	TCR–RBTN2 fusion	

=== Classification ===
French-American-British

Historically, before 2008, ALL was classified morphologically using the French-American-British (FAB) system that heavily relied on morphological assessment. The FAB system takes into account information on size, cytoplasm, nucleoli, basophilia (color of cytoplasm), and vacuolation (bubble-like properties).

FAB Subtype	Cell Type	Characteristics	Comments
ALL - L1	T cell or pre-B cell	Small and homogeneous (uniform) cells	
ALL - L2	T cell or pre-B cell	Large and heterogeneous (varied) cells	
ALL - L3	B cell	Large and varied cells with vacuoles	Mature B-cell ALL is also named Burkitt leukemia. Typically, it has a poor prognosis with standard therapy.

While some clinicians still use the FAB scheme to describe tumor cell appearance, much of this classification has been abandoned because of its limited impact on treatment choice and prognostic value.

World Health Organization

In 2008, the World Health Organization (WHO) classification of ALL was developed to create a classification system that was more clinically relevant and could produce meaningful prognostic and treatment decisions. This system recognized differences in genetic, immunophenotype, molecular, and morphological features through cytogenetic and molecular diagnostics tests. This subtyping helps determine the prognosis and the most appropriate treatment for each specific case of ALL.

The WHO subtypes related to ALL are:

- B-lymphoblastic leukemia/lymphoma
  - Not otherwise specified (NOS)
  - with recurrent genetic abnormalities
  - with t(9;22)(q34.1;q11.2);BCR-ABL1
  - with t(v;11q23.3);KMT2A rearranged
  - with t(12;21)(p13.2;q22.1); ETV6-RUNX1
  - with t(5;14)(q31.1;q32.3) IL3-IGH
  - with t(1;19)(q23;p13.3);TCF3-PBX1
  - with hyperdiploidy
  - with hypodiploidy
- T-lymphoblastic leukemia/lymphoma
- Acute leukemias of ambiguous lineage
  - Acute undifferentiated leukemia
  - Mixed phenotype acute leukemia (MPAL) with t(9;22)(q34.1;q11.2); BCR–ABL1
  - MPAL with t(v;11q23.3); KMT2A rearranged
  - MPAL, B/myeloid, NOS
  - MPAL, T/myeloid, NOS

== Treatment ==
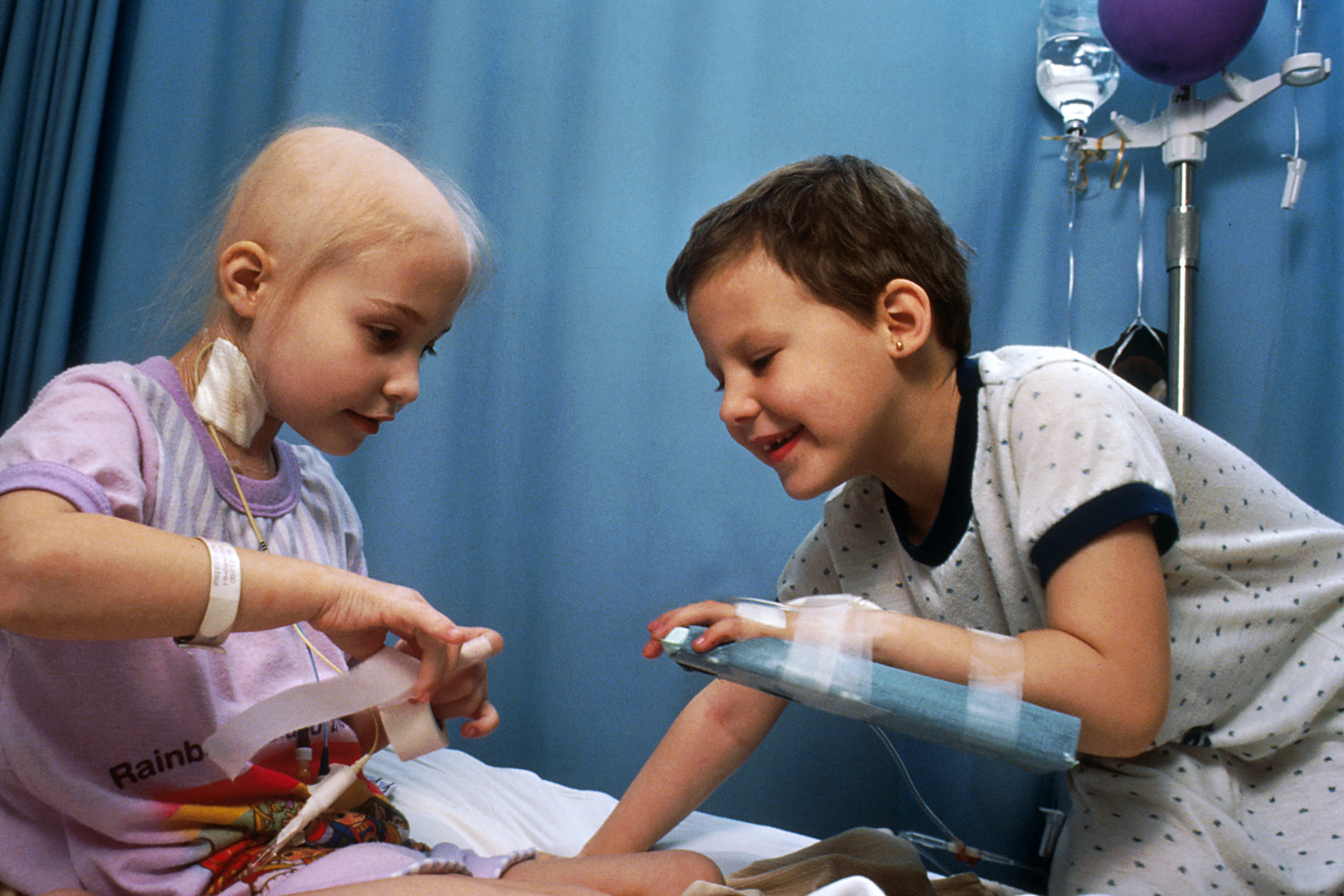
Two girls with ALL demonstrating intravenous access for chemotherapy

Treatment aims to induce a lasting remission, defined as the absence of detectable cancer cells in the body (usually less than 5% blast cells in the bone marrow) or the absence of minimal residual disease.

Over the past several decades, there have been strides to increase the efficacy of treatment regimens, resulting in increased survival rates. Possible treatments for acute leukemia include chemotherapy, steroids, radiation therapy, intensive combined treatments (including bone marrow or stem cell transplants), targeted therapy, and/or growth factors.

=== Chemotherapy ===
Chemotherapy is the initial treatment of choice, and most people with ALL receive a combination of medications. There are no surgical options because of the body-wide distribution of the malignant cells. In general, cytotoxic chemotherapy for ALL combines multiple antileukemic drugs tailored to each person. Chemotherapy for ALL consists of three phases: remission induction, intensification, and maintenance therapy.

Phase	Description	Agents
Remission induction	Aim to: Rapidly kill most tumor cells; Reduce leukemic blasts in the bone marrow to <5% and eliminate tumor cells from blood; Induce the absence of other signs and symptoms of the disease.; Must monitor closely for tumor lysis syndrome after initiating therapy Monitoring the initial response to treatment is important as failure to show clearance of blood or bone marrow blasts within the first two weeks of therapy has been associated with a higher risk of relapse: May need to intensify treatment if remission is not induced; Start CNS prophylaxis and administer intrathecal chemotherapy via Ommaya reservoir or multiple lumbar punctures	Combination of: steroids – prednisolone or dexamethasone; vincristine; asparaginase (better tolerance in people in pediatric care); daunorubicin (used in Adult ALL); Central nervous system prophylaxis can be achieved via: cranio-spinal irradiation; cytarabine + methotrexate; or liposomal cytarabine; In Philadelphia chromosome-positive ALL, the intensity of initial induction treatment may be less than has been traditionally given.
Consolidation/intensification	Use high doses of chemotherapy to further reduce tumor burden	Typical protocols use the following, given as blocks (varies from 1–3 blocks depending on a person's risk category) in different multi-drug combinations: vincristine; cyclophosphamide; cytarabine; daunorubicin; etoposide; thioguanine; mercaptopurine; Central nervous system relapse is treated with intrathecal administration of hydrocortisone, methotrexate, and cytarabine.
Maintenance therapy	Kill any residual cell that was not killed by remission induction and intensification regimens: Can sometimes start immediately after remission induction and be interrupted by bursts of consolidation/intensification therapy; Although such residual cells are few, they will cause relapse if not eradicated; Length of maintenance therapy is three years for boys, two years for girls, and adults	Typical protocol would include: daily oral mercaptopurine; weekly oral methotrexate; monthly 5-day course of intravenous vincristine and oral corticosteroids

Adult chemotherapy regimens mimic those of childhood ALL; however, they are linked with a higher risk of disease relapse with chemotherapy alone. Two subtypes of ALL (B-cell ALL and T-cell ALL) require special considerations when it comes to selecting an appropriate treatment regimen in adults with ALL. B-cell ALL is often associated with cytogenetic abnormalities (specifically, t(8;14), t (2;8), and t(8;22)), which require aggressive therapy consisting of brief, high-intensity regimens. T-cell ALL responds the most to cyclophosphamide-containing agents.

Recent updates on the treatment of adult acute lymphoblastic leukemia (ALL) include advancements in immunotherapy, particularly the use of monoclonal antibodies like blinatumomab and inotuzumab ozogamicin, which target specific cancer cells and are used alongside stem cell transplantation. Additionally, tyrosine kinase inhibitors (TKIs) such as imatinib and dasatinib are incorporated for Philadelphia chromosome-positive ALL, improving treatment outcomes.

=== Radiation therapy ===
Radiation therapy (or radiotherapy) is used on painful bony areas, in high disease burdens, or as part of the preparations for a bone marrow transplant (total body irradiation). In the past, physicians commonly utilized radiation in the form of whole-brain radiation for central nervous system prophylaxis, to prevent the occurrence and/or recurrence of leukemia in the brain. Recent studies showed that CNS chemotherapy provided results as favorable, but with fewer developmental side effects. As a result, the use of whole-brain radiation has been more limited. Most specialists in adult leukemia have abandoned the use of radiation therapy for CNS prophylaxis, instead using intrathecal chemotherapy.

=== Biological therapy ===
Selection of biological targets based on their combinatorial effects on the leukemic lymphoblasts can lead to clinical trials for improvement in the effects of ALL treatment. Tyrosine-kinase inhibitors (TKIs), such as imatinib, are often incorporated into the treatment plan for people with Bcr-Abl1+ (Ph+) ALL. However, this subtype of ALL is frequently resistant to the combination of chemotherapy and TKIs, and allogeneic stem cell transplantation is often recommended upon relapse.

Blinatumomab is not only a promising add-on to chemotherapy in infant ALL, it is also a promising standalone therapy in children.

=== Immunotherapy ===
Chimeric antigen receptors (CARs) have been developed as a promising immunotherapy for ALL. This technology uses a single chain variable fragment (scFv) designed to recognize the cell-surface marker CD19 as a method of treating ALL.

CD19 is a molecule on all B-cells and can be used to distinguish the potentially malignant B-cell population. In this therapy, mice are immunized with the CD19 antigen and produce anti-CD19 antibodies. Hybridomas developed from mouse spleen cells fused to a myeloma cell line can be developed as a source for the cDNA encoding the CD19-specific antibody. The cDNA is sequenced and the sequence encoding the variable heavy and variable light chains of these antibodies are cloned together using a small peptide linker. This resulting sequence encodes the scFv. This can be cloned into a transgene, encoding the precursor to the CAR endodomain. Varying arrangements of subunits serve as the endodomain. They generally consist of the hinge region that attaches to the scFv, a transmembrane region, the intracellular region of a costimulatory molecule such as CD28, and the intracellular domain of CD3-zeta containing ITAM repeats. Other sequences frequently included are: 4-1bb and OX40. The final transgene sequence, containing the scFv and endodomain sequences is then inserted into immune effector cells that are obtained from the person and expanded in vitro. In trials these have been a type of T-cell capable of cytotoxicity.

Inserting the DNA into the effector cell can be accomplished by several methods. Most commonly, this is done using a lentivirus that encodes the transgene. Pseudotyped, self-inactivating lentiviruses are an effective method for the stable insertion of a desired transgene into the target cell. Other methods include electroporation and transfection, but these are limited in their efficacy as transgene expression diminishes over time.

The gene-modified effector cells are then transplanted back into the person. Typically, this process is done in conjunction with a conditioning regimen such as cyclophosphamide, which has been shown to potentiate the effects of infused T-cells. This effect has been attributed to making an immunologic space within which the cells populate. The process as a whole results in an effector cell, typically a T-cell, that can recognize a tumor cell antigen in a manner that is independent of the major histocompatibility complex and which can initiate a cytotoxic response.

In 2017, tisagenlecleucel was approved by the FDA as a CAR-T therapy for people with acute B-cell lymphoblastic leukemia who did not respond adequately to other treatments or have relapsed. In a 22-day process, the "drug" is customized for each person. T cells purified from each person are modified by a virus that inserts genes that encode a chimaeric antigen receptor into their DNA, one that recognizes leukemia cells.

Obecabtagene autoleucel (Aucatzyl) was approved for medical use in the United States in November 2024.

=== Relapsed ALL ===
Typically, people who experience a relapse in their ALL after initial treatment have a poorer prognosis than those who remain in complete remission after induction therapy. It is unlikely that recurrent leukemia will respond favorably to the standard chemotherapy regimen that was initially implemented. Instead, these people should be trialed on reinduction chemotherapy followed by allogeneic bone marrow transplantation. These people in relapse may also receive blinatumomab, as it has been shown to increase remission rates and overall survival rates, without increased toxic effects.

Low-dose palliative radiation may also help reduce the burden of tumors inside or outside the central nervous system and alleviate some symptoms.

There has also been evidence and approval of use for dasatinib, a tyrosine kinase inhibitor. It has shown efficacy in cases of people with Ph1-positive and imatinib-resistant ALL, but more research needs to be done on long-term survival and time to relapse.

=== Side effects ===
Chemotherapies or stem cell transplantations may require a platelet transfusion to prevent bleeding. Moreover, patients undergoing a stem cell transplantation can develop a graft-versus-host disease (GvHD). It was evaluated whether mesenchymal stromal cells can be used to prevent GvHD. The evidence is very uncertain about the therapeutic effect of mesenchymal stromal cells in treating graft-versus-host disease after stem cell transplantation on all-cause mortality and the complete disappearance of chronic acute graft-versus-host disease. Mesenchymal stromal cells may result in little to no difference in the all-cause mortality, relapse of malignant disease, and incidence of acute and chronic graft-versus-host diseases if they are used for prophylactic reasons.

=== Supportive therapy ===
Adding physical exercises to the standard treatment for adult patients with haematological malignancies like ALL may result in little to no difference in mortality, quality of life, and physical functioning. These exercises may result in a slight reduction in depression. Furthermore, aerobic physical exercises probably reduce fatigue. The evidence is very uncertain about the effect on anxiety and serious adverse events.

=== Cell therapy ===
Brexucabtagene autoleucel (Tecartus) was approved by the FDA in October 2021 for the treatment of adults with relapsed or refractory B-cell precursor ALL, and later by the EMA in December 2021.

Each dose of brexucabtagene autoleucel is a customized treatment created using the recipient's immune system to help fight the leukemia. The recipient's T cells, a type of white blood cell, are collected and genetically modified to include a new gene that facilitates the targeting and killing of the lymphoma cells. These modified T cells are then infused back into the recipient.

== Prognosis ==
Before the development of chemotherapy regimens and hematopoietic stem cell transplants, children were surviving a median length of 3 months, largely due to either infection or bleeding. Since the advent of chemotherapy, the prognosis for childhood leukemia has improved greatly, and children with ALL are estimated to have a 95% probability of achieving a successful remission after 4 weeks of initiating treatment. People in pediatric care with ALL in developed countries have a greater than 80% five-year survival rate. It is estimated that 60–80% of adults undergoing induction chemotherapy achieve complete remission after 4 weeks, and those over the age of 70 have a cure rate of 5%.

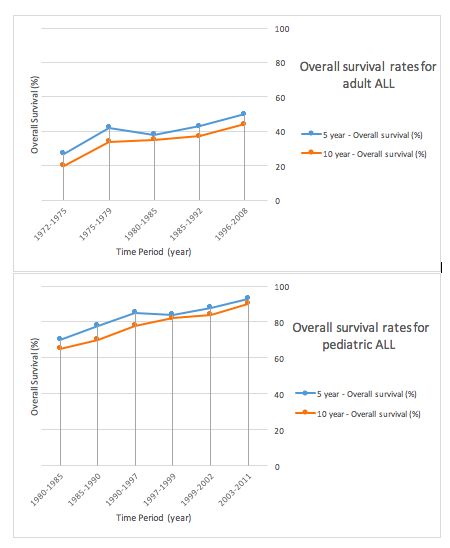
Graphs of overall survival rates at 5 years and 10 years in people in pediatric care and adults with ALL

However, there are differing prognoses for ALL among individuals depending on a variety of factors:

- Gender: Females tend to fare better than males.
- Ethnicity: Caucasians are more likely to develop acute leukemia than African-Americans, Asians, or Hispanics. However, they also tend to have a better prognosis than non-Caucasians.
- Age at diagnosis: children 1–10 years of age are most likely to develop ALL and to be cured of it. Cases in older people are more likely to result from chromosomal abnormalities (e.g., the Philadelphia chromosome) that make treatment more difficult and prognoses poorer. Older people are also likely to have co-morbid medical conditions that make it even more difficult to tolerate ALL treatment.
- White blood cell count at diagnosis of greater than 30,000 (B-ALL) or 100,000 (T-ALL) is associated with worse outcomes
- Cancer spreading into the central nervous system (brain or spinal cord) has worse outcomes.
- Morphological, immunological, and genetic subtypes
- Person's response to initial treatment and longer length of time required (greater than 4 weeks) to reach complete remission
- Early relapse of ALL
- Minimal residual disease
- Genetic disorders, such as Down syndrome, and other chromosomal abnormalities (aneuploidy and translocations)

In children
Factor	Unfavorable	Favorable
Age	<2 or >10 years	3–5 years
Sex	Male	Female
Race	Black	Caucasian
Organomegaly	Present	Absent
Mediastinal mass	Present	Absent
CNS involvement	Present	Absent
Leukocyte count	B-ALL >30,000mm^{3} T-ALL >100,000mm^{3}	Low
Hemoglobin concentration	>10g/dl	<10g/dl
Cell type	Non Lymphoid	Lymphoid
Cell lineage	Pre B cell + T-ALL (children)	Early Pre B cell
Karyotype	Translocation	Hyperdiploidy
Response to treatment	Slow >1 week to clear blasts from blood	Rapid <1 week to clear blasts from blood
Time to remission	>4 weeks	<4 weeks
Minimal residual disease	Positive at 3 – 6 months	Negative at 1 month (children) or 3 months (adults)

Cytogenetics, the study of characteristic large changes in the chromosomes of cancer cells, is an important predictor of outcome. Some cytogenetic subtypes have a worse prognosis than others. These include:

- Persons with t(9,22) positive-ALL (30% of adult ALL cases) and other Bcr-abl-rearranged leukemias are more likely to have a poor prognosis, but survival rates may rise with treatment consisting of chemotherapy and Bcr-abl tyrosine kinase inhibitors.
- A translocation between chromosomes 4 and 11 occurs in about 4% of cases and is most common in infants under 12 months.

Cytogenetic change	Risk category
Philadelphia chromosome	Poor prognosis
t(4;11)(q21;q23)	Poor prognosis
t(8;14)(q24.1;q32)	Poor prognosis
Complex karyotype (more than four abnormalities)	Poor prognosis
Low hypodiploidy or near triploidy	Poor prognosis
Deletion of chromosome 7	Poor prognosis
Trisomy 8	Poor prognosis
High hyperdiploidy (trisomy 4, 10, 17)	Good prognosis
del(9p)	Good prognosis

- Hyperdiploidy (>50 chromosomes) and t(12;21) are good prognostic factors and also makeup 50% of pediatric ALL cases.

Based on bone marrow cytogenetics
Prognosis	Cytogenetic findings
Favorable	Hyperdiploidy > 50; t (12;21)
Intermediate	Hyperdiploidy 47–50; Normal(diploidy); del (6q); Rearrangements of 8q24
Unfavorable	Hypodiploidy-near haploidy; Near tetraploidy; del (17p); t (9;22); t (11q23)

Unclassified ALL is considered to have an intermediate prognosis risk, somewhere in-between the good and poor risk categories.

== Epidemiology ==
Acute lymphoblastic leukemia affected about 876,000 people and resulted in 111,000 deaths globally in 2015. It occurs in both children and adults, with the highest rates seen between the ages of three and seven years. Around 75% of cases occur before the age of 6, with a secondary rise after age 40. It is estimated to affect 1 in 1500 children.

Accounting for the broad age profiles of those affected, ALL newly occurs in about 1.7 per 100,000 people annually. Acute lymphoblastic leukemia represents approximately 20% of adults and 80% of childhood leukemias, making it the most common childhood cancer. Although 80 to 90% of children will have a long-term complete response with treatment, it remains the leading cause of cancer-related deaths among children. 85% of cases are of B-cell lineage and have an equal number of cases in both males and females. The remaining 15% of the T-cell lineage has a male predominance.

Globally, ALL typically occurs more often in Caucasians, Hispanics, and Latin Americans than in Africans. In the US, ALL is more common in children from Caucasian (36 cases/million) and Hispanic (41 cases/million) descent when compared to those from African (15 cases/million) descent.

== Pregnancy ==
Leukemia is rarely associated with pregnancy, affecting only about 1 in 10,000 pregnant women. The management of leukemia in a pregnant woman depends primarily on the type of leukemia. Acute leukemias normally require prompt, aggressive treatment, despite significant risks of pregnancy loss and birth defects, especially if chemotherapy is given during the developmentally sensitive first trimester.
