= Pre-B-cell leukemia homeobox =

Protein family

Pre-B-cell leukemia homeobox (PBX) refers to a family of transcription factors.

Types include:

- PBX1
- PBX2
- PBX3
- PBX4

== See also ==
- Pre-B cell
