= HOXB1 =

Protein-coding gene in the species Homo sapiens

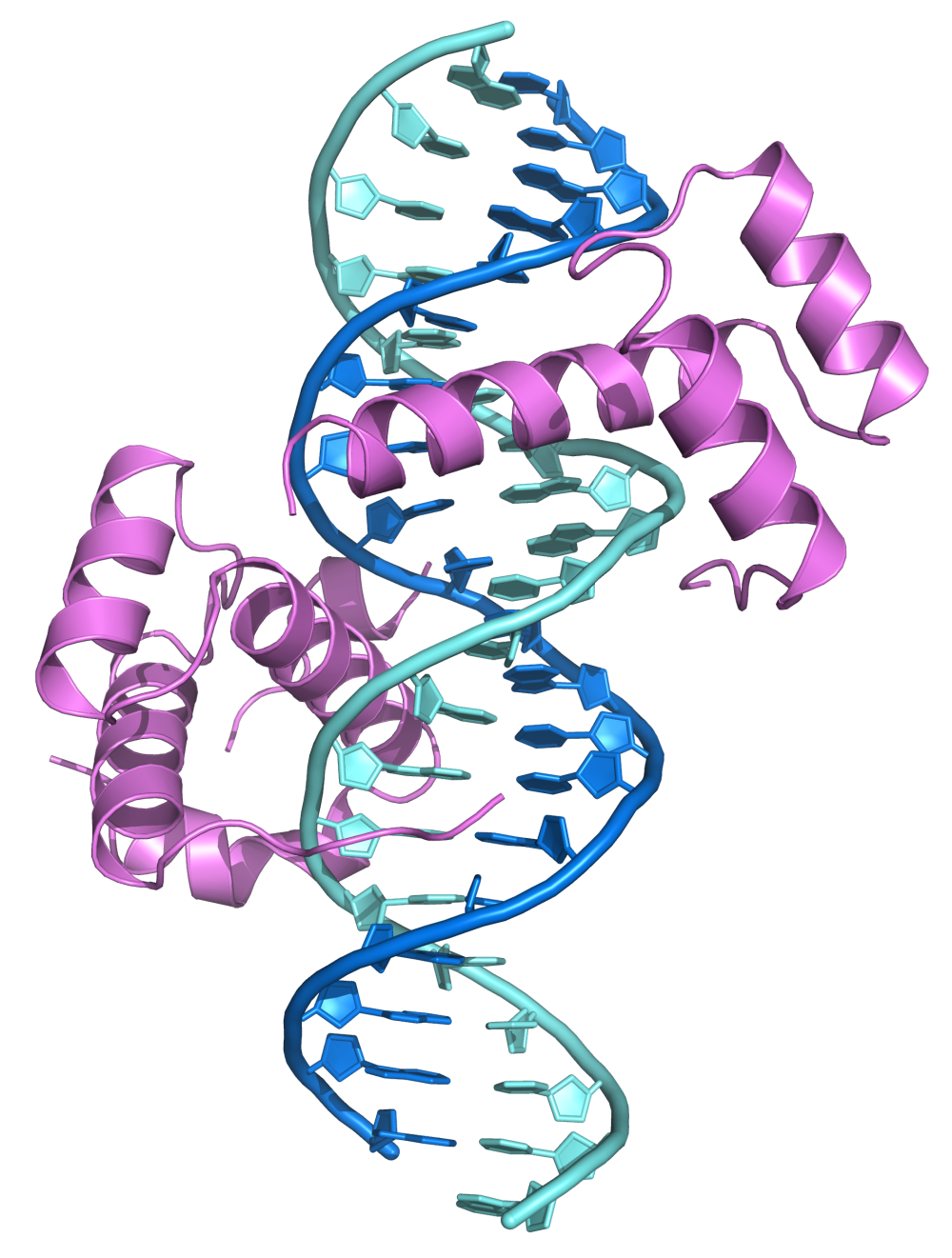

Identifiers
- Aliases: HOXB1, HCFP3, HOX2, HOX2I, Hox-2.9, homeobox B1
- External IDs: OMIM: 142968; MGI: 96182; GeneCards: HOXB1
Available structures
PDB	Ortholog search: PDBe RCSB
PDB	List of PDB id codes 1B72

Gene location (Human)
Chr.	Chromosome 17 (human)
Band	17q21.32	Start	48,528,526 bp
Band	17q21.32	End	48,531,011 bp

Gene location (Mouse)
Chr.	Chromosome 11 (mouse)
Band	11 D|11 59.86 cM	Start	96,256,578 bp
Band	11 D|11 59.86 cM	End	96,259,082 bp
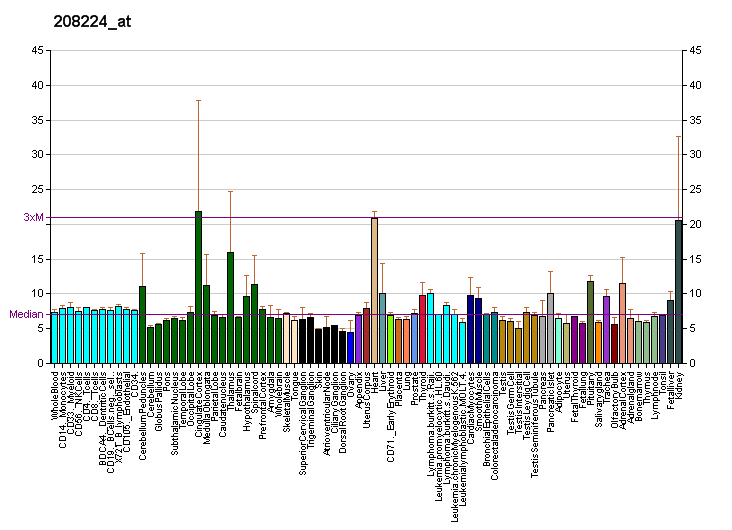
RNA expression pattern
Bgee	Human / Mouse (ortholog); Top expressed in: kidney; gonad; human kidney; renal cortex; cervix; fallopian tube; urinary bladder; right uterine tube; olfactory zone of nasal mucosa; zone of skin / Top expressed in: primitive streak; tail of embryo; embryo; Ileal epithelium; embryonic organizer; embryo; somite; neuromere; rhombomere; pharynx; More reference expression data
BioGPS	More reference expression data
Gene ontology
Molecular function	DNA binding; sequence-specific DNA binding; protein domain specific binding; RNA polymerase II transcription regulatory region sequence-specific DNA binding; RNA polymerase II cis-regulatory region sequence-specific DNA binding; DNA-binding transcription activator activity, RNA polymerase II-specific; DNA-binding transcription factor activity, RNA polymerase II-specific
Cellular component	nucleus
Biological process	multicellular organism development; pattern specification process; regulation of transcription, DNA-templated; transcription, DNA-templated; transcription by RNA polymerase II; positive regulation of transcription by RNA polymerase II; anatomical structure morphogenesis; anterior/posterior pattern specification; rhombomere development; rhombomere 4 development; rhombomere 5 development; facial nerve structural organization; facial nucleus development; anatomical structure formation involved in morphogenesis; embryonic skeletal system morphogenesis
Sources:Amigo / QuickGO
Orthologs
Databases	NCBI: entry; OMA: entry
Species	Human	Mouse
Entrez	3211	15407
Ensembl	ENSG00000120094	ENSMUSG00000018973
UniProt	P14653	P17919
RefSeq (mRNA)	NM_002144	NM_008266
RefSeq (protein)	NP_002135	NP_032292
Location (UCSC)	Chr 17: 48.53 – 48.53 Mb	Chr 11: 96.26 – 96.26 Mb
PubMed search
- Wikidata
View/Edit Human	View/Edit Mouse

Homeobox protein Hox-B1 is a protein that in humans is encoded by the HOXB1 gene.

== Function ==
This gene belongs to the homeobox family of genes. The homeobox genes encode a highly conserved family of transcription factors that play an important role in morphogenesis in all multicellular organisms. Mammals possess four similar homeobox gene clusters, HOXA, HOXB, HOXC and HOXD, located on different chromosomes, consisting of 9 to 11 genes arranged in tandem. This gene is one of several homeobox HOXB genes located in a cluster on chromosome 17.

== Interactions ==
HOXB1 has been shown to interact with PBX1.

== See also ==
- Tandemly arrayed genes
