= MEIS1 =

Protein-coding gene in humans

Identifiers
- Aliases: MEIS1, Meis homeobox 1
- External IDs: OMIM: 601739; MGI: 104717; GeneCards: MEIS1
Available structures
PDB	Ortholog search: PDBe RCSB
PDB	List of PDB id codes 4XRS

Gene location (Human)
Chr.	Chromosome 2 (human)
Band	2p14	Start	66,433,452 bp
Band	2p14	End	66,573,869 bp

Gene location (Mouse)
Chr.	Chromosome 11 (mouse)
Band	11 A3.1|11 11.11 cM	Start	18,829,817 bp
Band	11 A3.1|11 11.11 cM	End	18,968,985 bp
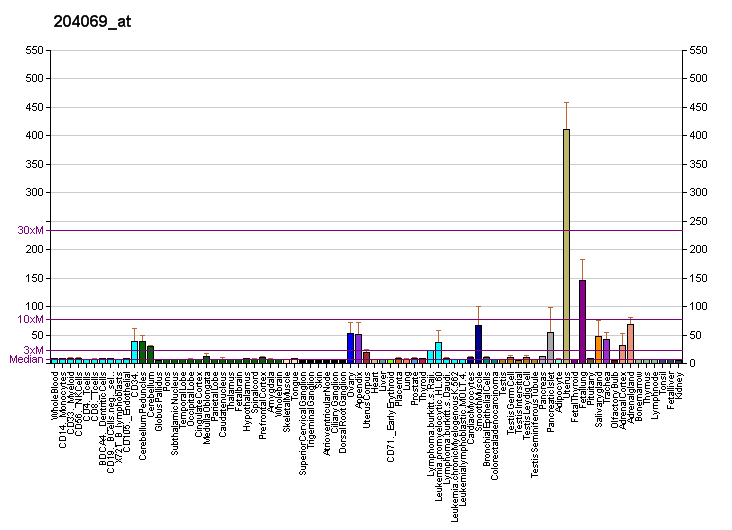
RNA expression pattern
Bgee	Human / Mouse (ortholog); Top expressed in: right uterine tube; gastric mucosa; body of uterus; canal of the cervix; left uterine tube; stromal cell of endometrium; ectocervix; palpebral conjunctiva; right adrenal gland; myometrium / Top expressed in: vestibular membrane of cochlear duct; lacrimal gland; parotid gland; external carotid artery; efferent ductule; vas deferens; superior cervical ganglion; conjunctival fornix; urethra; abdominal wall; More reference expression data
BioGPS	More reference expression data
Gene ontology
Molecular function	sequence-specific DNA binding; DNA-binding transcription activator activity, RNA polymerase II-specific; chromatin binding; RNA polymerase II cis-regulatory region sequence-specific DNA binding; protein binding; protein heterodimerization activity; transcription factor activity, RNA polymerase II distal enhancer sequence-specific binding; DNA-binding transcription factor activity, RNA polymerase II-specific; DNA binding
Cellular component	transcription regulator complex; nucleus
Biological process	megakaryocyte development; regulation of transcription, DNA-templated; blood vessel morphogenesis; negative regulation of neuron differentiation; locomotory behavior; transcription by RNA polymerase II; transcription, DNA-templated; multicellular organism development; lens morphogenesis in camera-type eye; angiogenesis; definitive hemopoiesis; negative regulation of myeloid cell differentiation; positive regulation of transcription by RNA polymerase II; negative regulation of cardiac muscle cell proliferation; hemopoiesis
Sources:Amigo / QuickGO
Orthologs
Databases	NCBI: entry; OMA: entry
Species	Human	Mouse
Entrez	4211	17268
Ensembl	ENSG00000143995	ENSMUSG00000020160
UniProt	O00470	Q60954
RefSeq (mRNA)	NM_002398	NM_001193271; NM_010789
RefSeq (protein)	NP_002389	NP_001180200; NP_034919
Location (UCSC)	Chr 2: 66.43 – 66.57 Mb	Chr 11: 18.83 – 18.97 Mb
PubMed search
- Wikidata
View/Edit Human	View/Edit Mouse

Homeobox protein Meis1 is a protein that in humans is encoded by the MEIS1 gene.

== Function ==
Homeobox genes, of which the most well-characterized category is represented by the HOX genes, play a crucial role in normal development. In addition, several homeoproteins are involved in neoplasia. This gene encodes a homeobox protein belonging to the TALE ('three amino acid loop extension') family of homeodomain-containing proteins.

== Interactions ==
MEIS1 has been shown to interact with PBX1 and HOXA9.
