= HOXA9 =

Protein-coding gene in humans

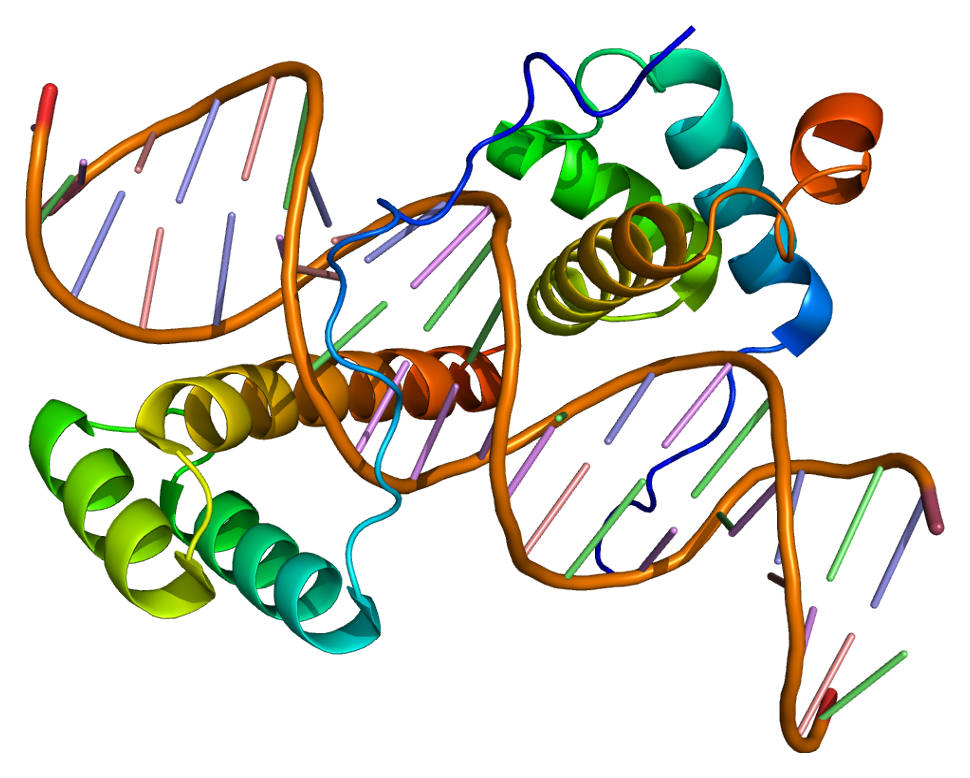

Identifiers
- Aliases: HOXA9, ABD-B, HOX1, HOX1.7, HOX1G, homeobox A9
- External IDs: OMIM: 142956; MGI: 96180; GeneCards: HOXA9
Available structures
PDB	Ortholog search: PDBe RCSB
PDB	List of PDB id codes 1PUF

Gene location (Human)
Chr.	Chromosome 7 (human)
Band	7p15.2	Start	27,162,438 bp
Band	7p15.2	End	27,175,180 bp

Gene location (Mouse)
Chr.	Chromosome 6 (mouse)
Band	6 B3|6 25.4 cM	Start	52,200,080 bp
Band	6 B3|6 25.4 cM	End	52,208,069 bp

RNA expression pattern
Bgee	Human / Mouse (ortholog); Top expressed in: testicle; glomerulus; metanephric glomerulus; biceps brachii; kidney tubule; Skeletal muscle tissue of biceps brachii; human penis; tibia; vulva; skin of hip / Top expressed in: renal corpuscle; tail of embryo; motor neuron; transitional epithelium of urinary bladder; gastrula; medullary collecting duct; vas deferens; abdominal wall; decidua; foot; More reference expression data
BioGPS	More reference expression data
Gene ontology
Molecular function	sequence-specific DNA binding; DNA binding; protein binding; enzyme binding; DNA-binding transcription factor activity, RNA polymerase II-specific; RNA polymerase II cis-regulatory region sequence-specific DNA binding
Cellular component	nucleus; transcription regulator complex; cytoplasm
Biological process	regulation of transcription, DNA-templated; endothelial cell activation; transcription, DNA-templated; multicellular organism development; regulation of transcription by RNA polymerase II; negative regulation of myeloid cell differentiation; spermatogenesis; single fertilization; male gonad development; anterior/posterior pattern specification; proximal/distal pattern formation; regulation of gene expression; mammary gland development; embryonic forelimb morphogenesis; positive regulation of transcription by RNA polymerase II; embryonic skeletal system development; uterus development; definitive hemopoiesis
Sources:Amigo / QuickGO
Orthologs
Databases	NCBI: entry; OMA: entry
Species	Human	Mouse
Entrez	3205	15405
Ensembl	ENSG00000078399	ENSMUSG00000038227
UniProt	P31269	P09631
RefSeq (mRNA)	NM_152739; NM_002142	NM_001277238; NM_010456
RefSeq (protein)	NP_689952	NP_001264167; NP_034586
Location (UCSC)	Chr 7: 27.16 – 27.18 Mb	Chr 6: 52.2 – 52.21 Mb
PubMed search
- Wikidata
View/Edit Human	View/Edit Mouse

Homeobox protein Hox-A9 is a protein that in humans is encoded by the HOXA9 gene.

In vertebrates, the genes encoding the class of transcription factors called homeobox genes are found in clusters named A, B, C, and D on four separate chromosomes. Expression of these proteins is spatially and temporally regulated during embryonic development. This gene is part of the A cluster on chromosome 7 and encodes a DNA-binding transcription factor which may regulate gene expression, morphogenesis, and differentiation. This gene is highly similar to the abdominal-B (Abd-B) gene of Drosophila fly. A specific translocation event which causes a fusion between this gene and the NUP98 gene has been associated with myeloid leukemogenesis.

As HOXA9 dysfunction has been implicated in acute myeloid leukemia, and expression of the gene has been shown to differ markedly between erythrocyte lineages of different stages of development, the gene is of particular interest from a hematopoietic perspective.

== Function ==
=== Role in hematopoiesis ===
As HOXA9 is part of the homeobox family, involved in setting the body plans of animals, it is likely that HOXA9 would display increased expression in cells with higher differentiation potentials. Indeed in the hematopoietic lineage, it has been found that HOXA9 is preferentially expressed in hematopoietic stem cells (HSCs), and is down-regulated as the cell differentiates and matures further.

HOXA9 knockout mice have been shown to develop a reduction in the number of circulating common myeloid progenitor cells, which differentiate into erythroid progenitor cells. The same study indicated that HOXA9 deficiencies specifically affected the granulocyte lineage of the common myeloid progenitor, and it was in HOXA7 knockout mice where the erythroid lineage was affected; however, ErythronDB shows HOXA7 as being insignificantly expressed in all stages of each erythroid lineage. This is something that needs to be investigated further, and could shed light on the interactions between the genes in the HOXA family.

Another study found that HOXA9 knockout HSCs displayed a 5-fold impairment to proliferation rate in vitro, as well as delayed maturation to committed progenitors, specifically myeloid maturation, and that normal proliferation and differentiation rates could be reinstated by reintroducing a HOXA9 vector into the culture. In vivo, lethally irradiated mice with transplanted HOXA9 knockout HSCs displayed a 4-fold to 12-fold reduction in repopulating ability. Furthermore, they developed 60% less myeloid and erythroid colonies in the bone marrow when compared to the wild type. Furthermore, transgenic mice with overexpressed HOXA9 developed a 15-fold increase in the amount of committed progenitor cells in the bone marrow, indicating that overexpressed HOXA9 induces expansion of the HSC population without disrupting differentiation.

From these results, it appears that HOXA9 is important in maintaining HSC populations, as well as guiding their differentiation, especially towards myeloid (erythroid and granulocyte) lineages.

=== Expression in adult, fetal and embryonic stages ===
Throughout the development of a mammal, there are three distinct stages of erythrocyte formation – embryonic, fetal and adult. Adult erythrocytes are the most common blood cell type in mammals, and their characteristic biconcave shape, 7-8 μm diameter and enucleation are amongst the greatest commonalities between mammalian species. However, primitive and fetal erythrocytes, which circulate during early stages of development, are markedly different from their adult counterparts, most obviously through their larger size, shorter lifespan, nucleation, containment of different hemoglobin chains, and higher oxygen affinity. The reasons for and functions of these differences are not well established.

HOXA9 is a candidate for one of the genes responsible for these morphological differences between the erythrocyte lineages, as it is expressed differently in each lineage. In primitive erythrocyte precursors, HOXA9 expression is almost zero. It increases slightly in the fetal stage, and then it is expressed highly in the adult erythrocyte precursors. This expression profile links to the importance of HOXA9 in the HSC, as it mirrors the fact that HSCs are absent in the developing embryo, undergoing initial production in the fetal stage, and are vital in the adult. Furthermore, in the fetal and adult precursors, not all precursor stages display HOXA9 expression. Most of the expression is in the proerythroblast (P) stage, and a minor amount in the basophilic erythroblast (B) stage. There is almost zero expression in the orthonormoblast (O) and reticulocyte (R) stages. P and B are the first two stages of committed differentiation in the erythrocyte lineage, and this implies that HOXA9 may only be involved in the differentiation and proliferation of HSCs, rather than the erythrocyte maturation process.

== Clinical significance ==
=== Role in acute myeloid leukemia ===
Ordinarily, HOXA9 is expressed on chromosome 7 and the nucleoporin gene NUP98 is expressed on chromosome 11. However, a gene translocation which sometimes occurs in humans moves NUP98 onto chromosome 7, where it fuses with HOXA9 to form the NUP98-HOXA9 oncogene. This oncogene has been widely implicated in acute myeloid leukemia (AML), and expression of this oncogene is the single most highly correlating factor for poor AML prognosis. The oncogene has been found to increase proliferative rates of HSCs whilst impairing their differentiation.

The HOXA9 fusion oncogene causes an 8 times greater proliferation rate of HSCs after 5 weeks of cell culture when compared to control cells, and doubles the period of time over which HSCs can self-renew to an average of 54.3 days, compared to control human HSCs which stopped proliferating after 27.3 days.

There are conflicting results regarding the effect of the oncogene on the differentiation of HSCs into the erythroid lineage. One study observed that the oncogene had a detrimental effect on the differentiation of HSCs, especially in the erythroid lineage, as proerythroblast colonies derived in vitro from mutated HSCs were fewer in number when compared to those derived from control HSCs, regardless of growth factors such as erythropoietin and interleukins which were introduced into the cultures. However, another study noted that the erythroid colonies were twice as populated in cultures of oncogene HSCs when compared to control HSCs. It is possible that these differing observations are due to a delayed differentiation of HSCs affected by the oncogene. The study which observed an increase in erythroid cell number noted that this proliferative effect could only be observed after around 3 weeks, and before this, cell numbers were comparable if not lower for the oncogene culture. The study observing a decreased number of cells did not quote the time of measurement, so if it was within three weeks of the culture, the reduced number may be attributed to this delay.

=== Morphology alteration ===
Proerythroblasts formed in the densely populated colonies of oncogene HSC cultures are strikingly different from those formed in the control colonies. By staining the colonies with giemsa, the oncogene-derived cells were shown to be non-hemoglobinized, larger, much less uniform in shape and had a distinctly large nucleus. These are some of the key morphological differences between primitive erythrocytes and adult erythrocytes. Thus, the NUP98-HOXA9 fusion may give rise to a new population of primitive erythrocytes in cases of AML, and by investigating the various proteins coded by this oncogene, it may be possible to not only establish some molecular causes of AML, but also identify some crucial proteins involved in early erythropoiesis which are absent during adult erythropoiesis.

=== Pure erythroid leukemia ===
There exists a rare form of AML, pure erythroid leukemia, where only the erythroid precursors of myeloid progenitors are leukemic, and not the granulocyte precursors. In this form of AML, levels of erythroblasts can reach up to 94.8% of all nucleated cells in the bone marrow, and the immature forms of the erythroblasts, the proerythroblasts and basophilic erythroblasts, are more commonly found. One study noted that in control leukemic groups with general AML, immature erythroblasts accounted for 8% of all erythroid cells, but in a group with pure erythroid leukemia, this number was a minimum of 40%, and ranged up to 83%. Furthermore, in the case of pure erythroid leukemia, the immature erythrocytes are most morphologically affected, being larger and sometimes bi- or tri-nucleic. Hence the most affected stages of erythrocyte development in pure erythroid leukemia are the same stages in which HOXA9 expression is greatest.

==== Potential in Ovarian Cancer ====
HOXA9 has also been used as a potential biomarker for ovarian cancer. Because the homebox family of genes plays an essential role in development and differentiation, it is common to see malformations in these crucial genes often linked to malignancy (Faaborg et al., 2021). About 70%-80% of all deaths from epithelial ovarian cancer are associated with high-grade serous ovarian cancer (Li et al., 2022).

HOXA9 genes are responsible for the patterning of the Müllerian system in females and often found in the fallopian tubes, however, it has been found to be methylated in ovarian tissues (Faaborg et al., 2021). When HOXA9 gene shows methylation in the ovarian tissue, it is believed that this abnormal gene expression is a precursor for carcinogenesis via the molecular pathway in the ovarian tissue(Faaborg et al., 2021).

In normal ovaries and benign tumors, HOXA9 is not methylated but in all ovarian cancer tissues, it is methylated (Faaborg et al., 2021). This supports the thought that hypermethylation in of promoter regions of HOXA9 in ovarian tissues could possibly activate oncogenesis or suppress tumor-suppressing genes which would also support oncogenesis (Faaborg et al., 2021).

Since the symptoms of ovarian cancer are so indistinct, it is often diagnosed late as an advanced disease with limited options for a cure (Faaborg et al., 2021). Early diagnoses would be a massive improvement in the survival rate and treatment route of patients with this illness.

== Interactions ==
HOXA9 has been shown to interact with:

- MEIS1,
- PBX2, and
- TRIP6.

HOXA9 expression is regulated by several genes, including UTX, NSD2, MLL and MEN1. UTX, MLL and WHSC1 code for protein methylation and demethylation activity, specifically for the histone methyltransferase complex, of which increased levels have been shown to correlate with higher HOXA9 expression. MEN1 codes for the tumour suppressing protein menin, and lower menin levels as a result of MEN1 excision correlate with low HOXA9 expression. UTX and WHSC1 also display similar expression patterns to HOXA9, being lowest in the embryonic erythrocyte lineage, higher in the fetal stage and showing highest expression in the adult stage. MLL and MEN1, however, show consistent expression through each erythroid lineage, and it is possible that some other transcription factor may be interfering with the actions of these genes on HOXA9 during the embryonic stage.

HOXA9 itself regulates a vast array of genes, such as Flt3, Erg, Myb and Lmo2, all of which exhibit the characteristic increasing expression pattern through the erythroid lineages displayed by HOXA9. Furthermore, mutations in each of these genes have been implicated in cancers. Flt3 duplication is observed in 20% of AML cases, and along with NUP98 translocation, it is associated with a poor prognosis. Erg and Myb are part of two families of transcription factors which, when mutated, correlate strongly with prostate cancer and myeloblastosis respectively. Lmo2 is associated with T-cell leukemias, and is also essential to erythropoiesis in early developmental stages, as Lmo2 knockout mice experience yolk sac erythropoiesis failure and the embryo dies around 10.5 days post coitus. This seems to contradict with the observed expression of Lmo2 being significantly lower in embryonic stages compared to fetal and adult stages.

Other genes have already been shown to co-operate with NUP98-HOXA9 and increase their activity, such as Dnalc4, Fcgr2b, FcrI and Con1. This particular study utilized reverse transcription polymerase chain reaction to measure changes in gene expression.

== See also ==
- Homeobox
