= HOXB7 =

Protein-coding gene in humans

Identifiers
- Aliases: HOXB7, HHO.C1, HOX2, HOX2C, Hox-2.3, homeobox B7
- External IDs: OMIM: 142962; MGI: 96188; GeneCards: HOXB7

Gene location (Human)
Chr.	Chromosome 17 (human)
Band	17q21.32	Start	48,607,232 bp
Band	17q21.32	End	48,633,572 bp

Gene location (Mouse)
Chr.	Chromosome 11 (mouse)
Band	11 D|11 59.82 cM	Start	96,177,449 bp
Band	11 D|11 59.82 cM	End	96,180,988 bp
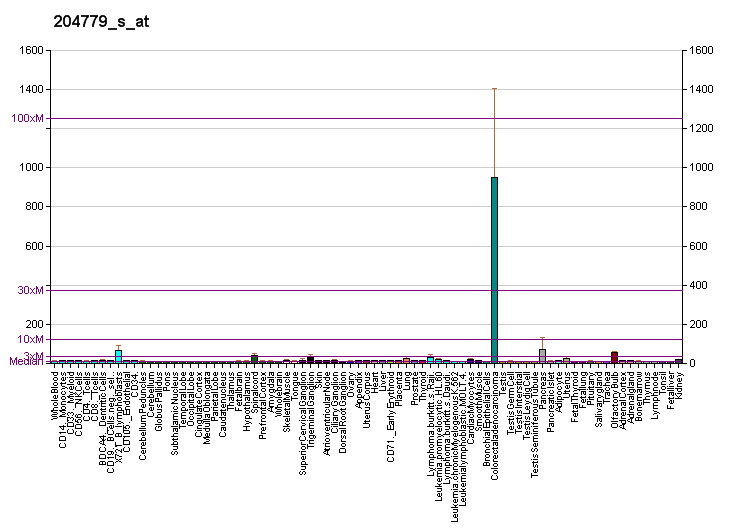

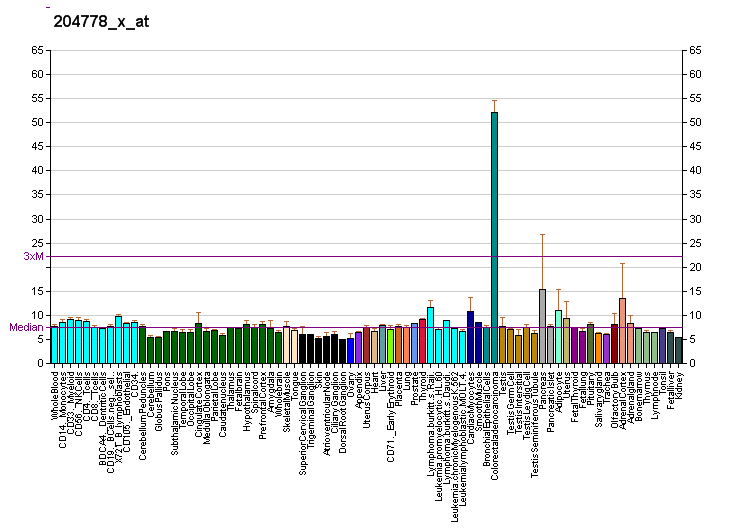

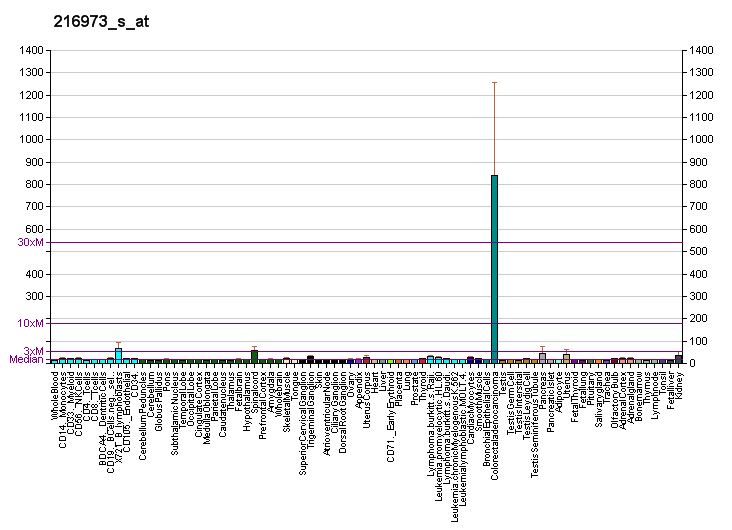
RNA expression pattern
Bgee	Human / Mouse (ortholog); Top expressed in: corpus epididymis; mucosa of ileum; mucosa of transverse colon; caput epididymis; seminal vesicula; mucosa of sigmoid colon; tail of epididymis; buccal mucosa cell; renal medulla; endometrium / Top expressed in: tail of embryo; right kidney; Hindgut; neural tube; intestinal villus; Ileal epithelium; embryo; proximal tubule; allantois; genital tubercle; More reference expression data
BioGPS	More reference expression data
Gene ontology
Molecular function	DNA-binding transcription factor activity; sequence-specific DNA binding; DNA binding; protein binding; RNA polymerase II cis-regulatory region sequence-specific DNA binding; DNA-binding transcription activator activity, RNA polymerase II-specific; DNA-binding transcription factor activity, RNA polymerase II-specific; transcription factor activity, RNA polymerase II distal enhancer sequence-specific binding
Cellular component	nucleus; nucleoplasm; cytosol; nuclear body
Biological process	multicellular organism development; embryonic skeletal system morphogenesis; myeloid cell differentiation; positive regulation of branching involved in ureteric bud morphogenesis; regulation of transcription, DNA-templated; transcription, DNA-templated; anterior/posterior pattern specification; transcription by RNA polymerase II; positive regulation of transcription by RNA polymerase II
Sources:Amigo / QuickGO
Orthologs
Databases	NCBI: entry; OMA: entry
Species	Human	Mouse
Entrez	3217	15415
Ensembl	ENSG00000260027	ENSMUSG00000038721
UniProt	P09629	P09024
RefSeq (mRNA)	NM_004502	NM_010460
RefSeq (protein)	NP_004493	NP_034590
Location (UCSC)	Chr 17: 48.61 – 48.63 Mb	Chr 11: 96.18 – 96.18 Mb
PubMed search
- Wikidata
View/Edit Human	View/Edit Mouse

Homeobox protein Hox-B7 is a protein that in humans is encoded by the HOXB7 gene.

== Function ==
This gene is a member of the Antp homeobox family and encodes a protein with a homeobox DNA-binding domain. It is included in a cluster of homeobox B genes located on chromosome 17. The encoded nuclear protein functions as a sequence-specific transcription factor that is involved in cell proliferation and differentiation. Increased expression of this gene is associated with some cases of melanoma and ovarian carcinoma.

== Interactions ==
HOXB7 has been shown to interact with PBX1 and CREB-binding protein.

== See also ==
- Homeobox
