= Hypodiploid acute lymphoblastic leukemia =

Chromosome mutation of lukemic cells with 45 chromosomes or less

Hypodiploid acute lymphoblastic leukemia is the chromosome mutation of leukemic cells with 45 chromosomes or less. It has been determined that the prognosis of hypodiploid is much worse than standard acute lymphoblastic leukemia. The lower the chromosome count, the lower the survival rate. In a study documented by the American Society of Hematology 17 of 27 patients relapsed, which indicates poor treatment responsiveness of hypodiploid ALL. Hypodiploidy is an unfavorable karyotypic feature in childhood ALL.
