= TRIP6 =

Protein-coding gene in the species Homo sapiens

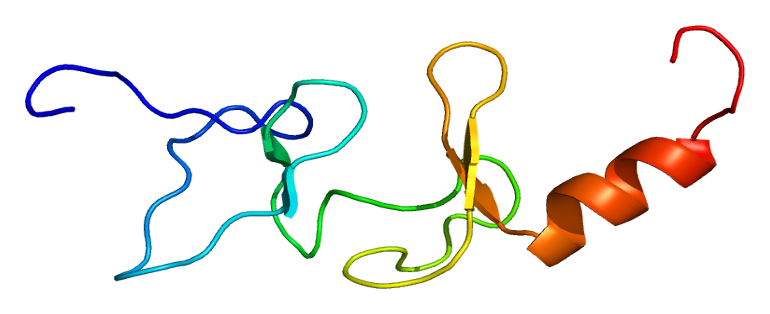

Identifiers
- Aliases: TRIP6, OIP-1, OIP1, TRIP-6, TRIP6i2, ZRP-1, thyroid hormone receptor interactor 6
- External IDs: OMIM: 602933; MGI: 1343458; GeneCards: TRIP6
Available structures
PDB	Ortholog search: PDBe RCSB
PDB	List of PDB id codes 1X61, 2DLO

Gene location (Human)
Chr.	Chromosome 7 (human)
Band	7q22.1	Start	100,867,387 bp
Band	7q22.1	End	100,873,454 bp

Gene location (Mouse)
Chr.	Chromosome 5 (mouse)
Band	5|5 G2	Start	137,307,916 bp
Band	5|5 G2	End	137,312,666 bp
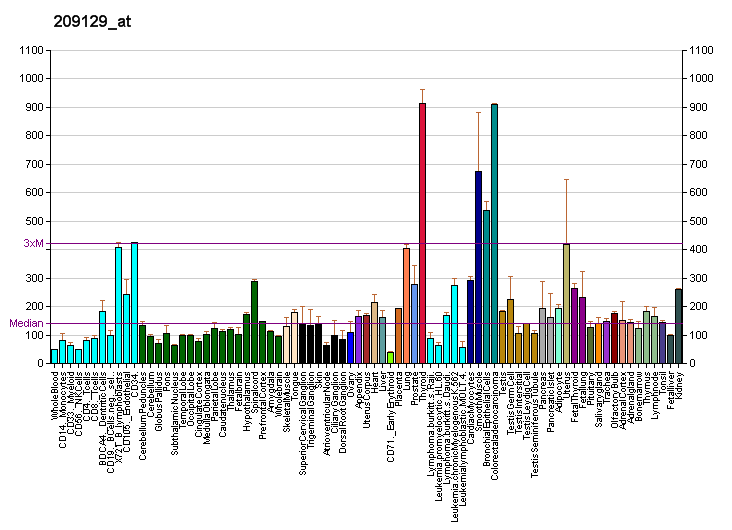
RNA expression pattern
Bgee	Human / Mouse (ortholog); Top expressed in: body of uterus; right lobe of thyroid gland; palpebral conjunctiva; canal of the cervix; left uterine tube; nipple; ectocervix; left lobe of thyroid gland; ascending aorta; gastric mucosa / Top expressed in: external carotid artery; internal carotid artery; vas deferens; condyle; ascending aorta; efferent ductule; aortic valve; fossa; vestibular membrane of cochlear duct; dermis; More reference expression data
BioGPS	More reference expression data
Gene ontology
Molecular function	kinase binding; protein binding; interleukin-1 receptor binding; metal ion binding; thyroid hormone receptor binding; RNA binding
Cellular component	cell junction; plasma membrane; interleukin-1 receptor complex; cytoskeleton; nucleus; focal adhesion; cytoplasm; cytosol; stress fiber
Biological process	focal adhesion assembly; cell adhesion; regulation of transcription, DNA-templated; transcription, DNA-templated; positive regulation of cell migration; positive regulation of NIK/NF-kappaB signaling; signal transduction
Sources:Amigo / QuickGO
Orthologs
Databases	NCBI: entry; OMA: entry
Species	Human	Mouse
Entrez	7205	22051
Ensembl	ENSG00000087077	ENSMUSG00000023348
UniProt	Q15654	Q9Z1Y4
RefSeq (mRNA)	NM_003302	NM_011639
RefSeq (protein)	NP_003293	NP_035769
Location (UCSC)	Chr 7: 100.87 – 100.87 Mb	Chr 5: 137.31 – 137.31 Mb
PubMed search
- Wikidata
View/Edit Human	View/Edit Mouse

Thyroid receptor-interacting protein 6 is a protein that in humans is encoded by the TRIP6 gene.

== Function ==
This gene is a member of the zyxin family and encodes a protein with three LIM zinc-binding domains. This protein localizes to focal adhesion sites and along actin stress fibers. Recruitment of this protein to the plasma membrane occurs in a lysophosphatidic acid (LPA)-dependent manner and it regulates LPA-induced cell migration. Alternatively spliced variants which encode different protein isoforms have been described; however, not all variants have been fully characterized.

== Interactions ==
TRIP6 has been shown to interact with LPAR2, BCAR1 and HOXA9.
