= Central nervous system prophylaxis =

Central Nervous System Prophylaxis, or CNS prophylaxis, is a type of chemotherapy for patients at risk of cancer metastasis into the central nervous system (CNS). Prophylaxis originated from the Greek word "phulaxis", meaning the act of guarding. CNS prophylaxis refers to preventative measures that kill cancer cells potentially in the intrathecal space and the organs of the central nervous system.

CNS involvement is observed in 5% of acute leukaemia patients. It is regarded as an indicator of poor prognosis, and increased difficulty in treatment due to the drug-expelling properties of the blood-brain barrier (BBB). Preventative treatment may be recommended for more aggressive lymphomas and leukaemias, including non-Hodgkin lymphoma, of which Diffuse Large B-cell lymphoma (DLBCL) is the most common subtype.

The most widely-used prophylactic drug is methotrexate (MTX), which is normally administered by one of two methods: intravenous injection (IV HD-MTX) and intrathecal injection (IT-MTX). Intravenous injection requires a direct injection of high-dose MTX into a patient's vein; Intrathecal injection, i.e. injection of the drug into the intrathecal space holding cerebrospinal fluid (CSF), is either administered via the Ommaya reservoir, an implanted container passing fluid into the brain, or by lumbar puncture.

IT-MTX and IV HD-MTX pose different side effects in addition to that of normal dose MTX. While IV HD-MTX poses higher risks of hepatotoxicity and nephrotoxicity, IT-MTX also leads to adverse effects characteristic of Ommaya reservoir implantation or lumbar puncture.

Clinically, the CNS-International Prognostic Index (CNS-IPI) is used to assess a patient's need for prophylaxis. Clinical and biological risk factors, as well as baseline screening provides additional insight into risk stratification. In the past decade, research has also raised some controversies, particularly on the effectiveness of current CNS prophylaxis strategies for DLBCL.

== CNS metastasis ==
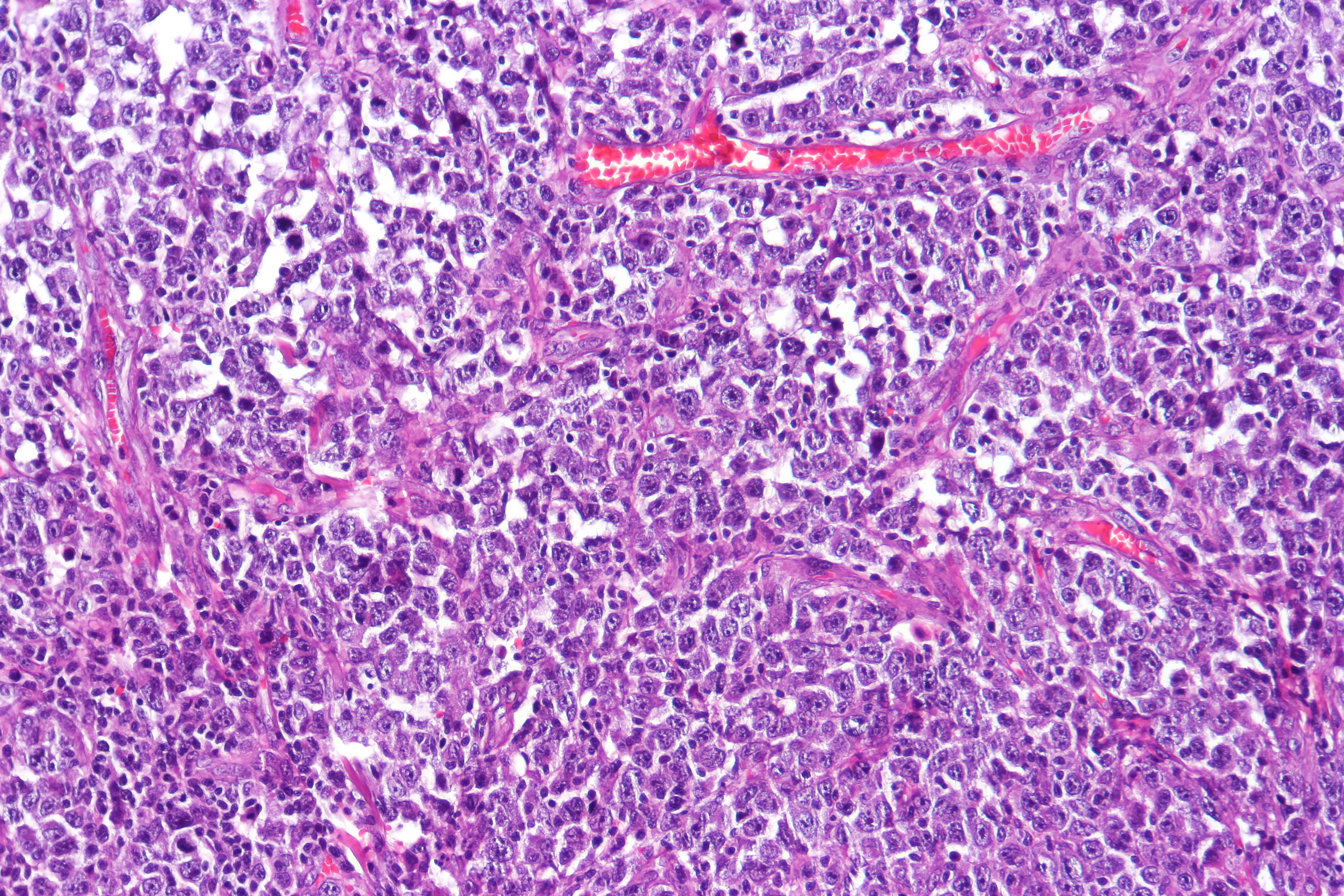
Histological sample of diffuse large B-cell lymphoma (DLBCL)

Lymphoma cancer types have varying probabilities of metastasizing to the CNS, resulting in secondary CNS lymphoma (SCNSL), which may appear simultaneously as systemic lymphoma, or as remission after systemic lymphoma is treated. Synchronous, or de novo disease is diagnosed in approximately 40% of patients and relapse in 60%. Overall, CNS involvement is observed in 2 to 27% of patients with aggressive systemic non-Hodgkin's lymphoma. 5% of patients with diffuse large B cell lymphoma, the most common type of non-Hodgkin lymphoma, result in SCNSL but account for most SCNSL cases.

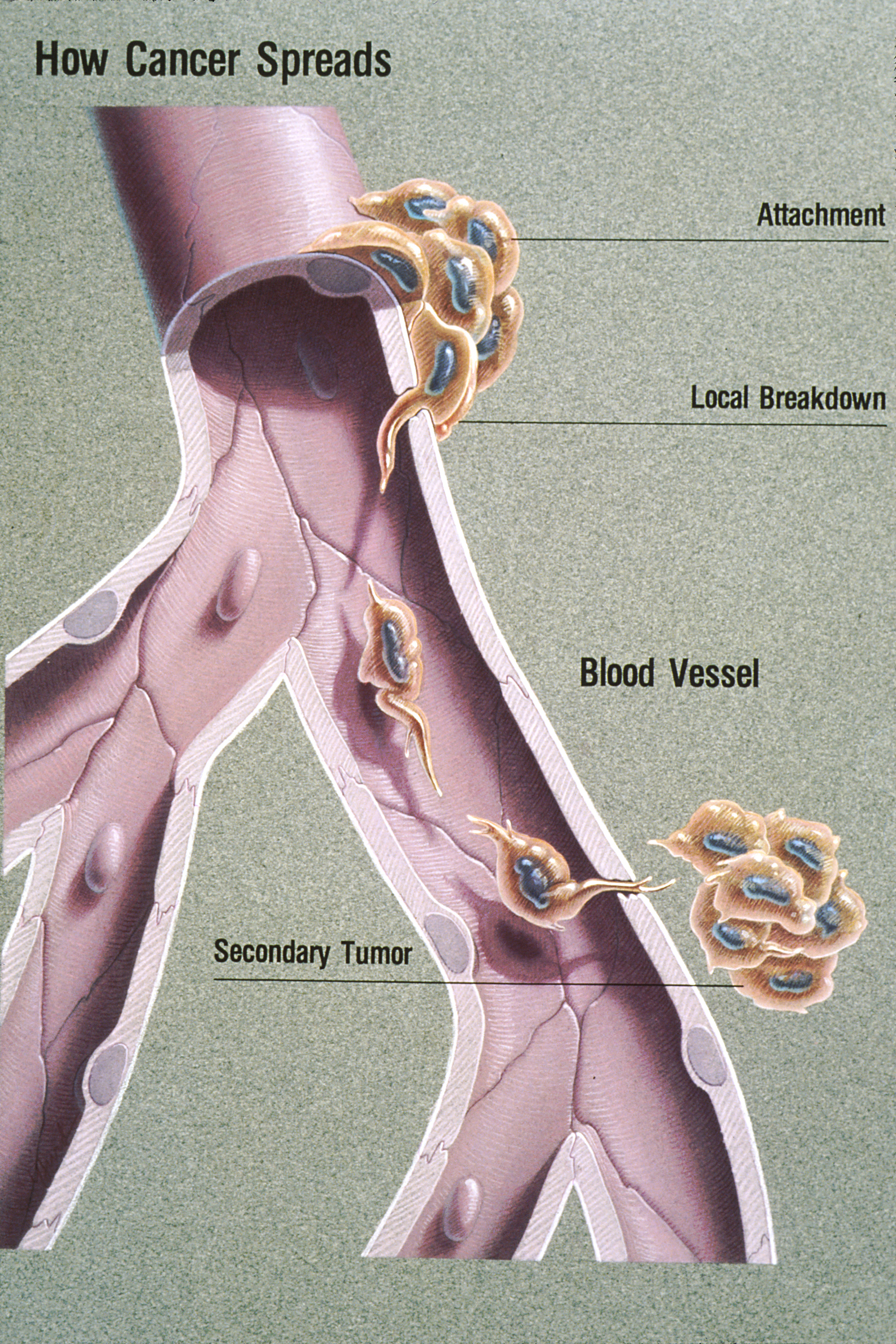
Illustration depicting metastasis by haematogenous spread

Hypotheses on CNS dissemination include, in order of most to least confirmatory evidence, haematogenous spread, direct extension from adjacent bone marrow infiltration, centripetal growth along neurovascular bundles, or via intervertebral venous plexus. Haematogenous spread entails the migration of lymphoma via blood circulation, and given its abundant blood supply, arrives and penetrates into the CNS, usually involving the cerebrospinal fluid and meninges. Solid parenchymal brain metastasis is more likely to occur in extranodal-originating lymphomas such as the testis.

SCNSL is associated with poor prognosis historically. The median survival is 2.2 months after diagnosis. Clinically, diverse symptoms are observed, including motor deficits, headaches, cognitive impairment, cranial nerve involvement and neuropsychiatric changes. SCNSL in patients with ocular involvement may present as blurred vision and floaters. In older patients, asthenia, hearing impairment and urinary incontinence may be observed. In light of these consequences, some physicians recommend CNS prophylactic treatment.

== Methods of Treatment ==
Chemical structure of methotrexate

The most popular type of CNS prophylactic drug is methotrexate (MTX), an antimetabolite and immunomodulator known to fight lymphoma by interfering with cell growth and division. Contrary to systemic treatments, delivery of MTX to its target site is relatively difficult, due to the drug-expelling properties of the blood-brain barrier via P-glycoprotein trafficking.

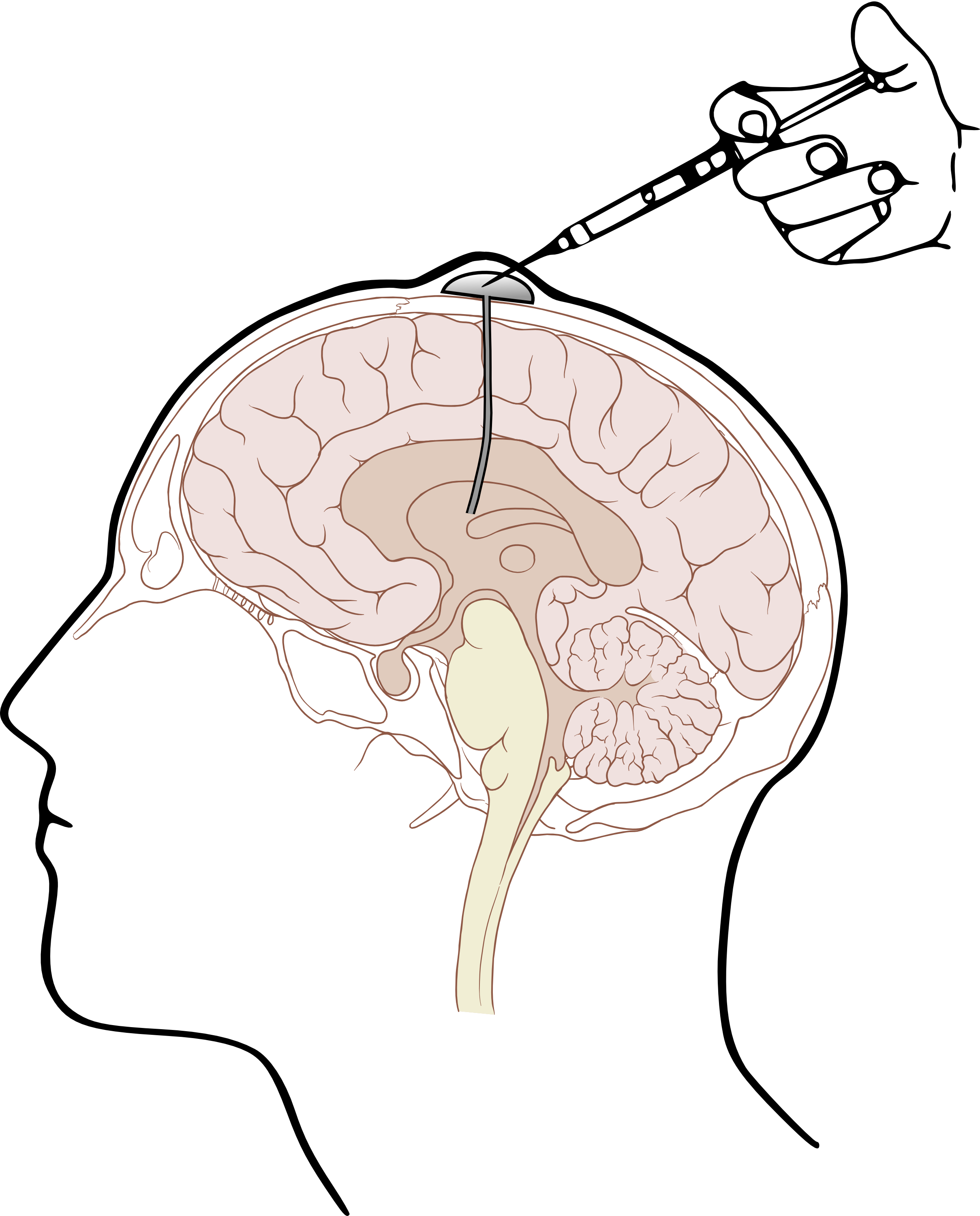
Illustration of an Ommaya reservoir

One solution is high-dosage methotrexate (IV HD-MTX), defined as ≥5 g/m2, administered by intravenous injection. IV HD-MTX is delivered in addition to standard R-CHOP chemotherapy consisting of rituximab, a monoclonal antibody; cyclophosphamide, doxorubicin and vincristine, chemotherapy drugs; and prednisolone, a corticosteroid. Prophylaxis historically has been given either in between cycles of R-CHOP or upon commencement of R-CHOP. Intercalating treatment was found to increase toxicities during R-CHOP cycles, delaying the delivery of systemic chemoimmunotherapy; on the other hand, given that CNS relapses were reported to be as early as six to eight months from initial diagnosis, prophylaxis is recommended to be given timely.

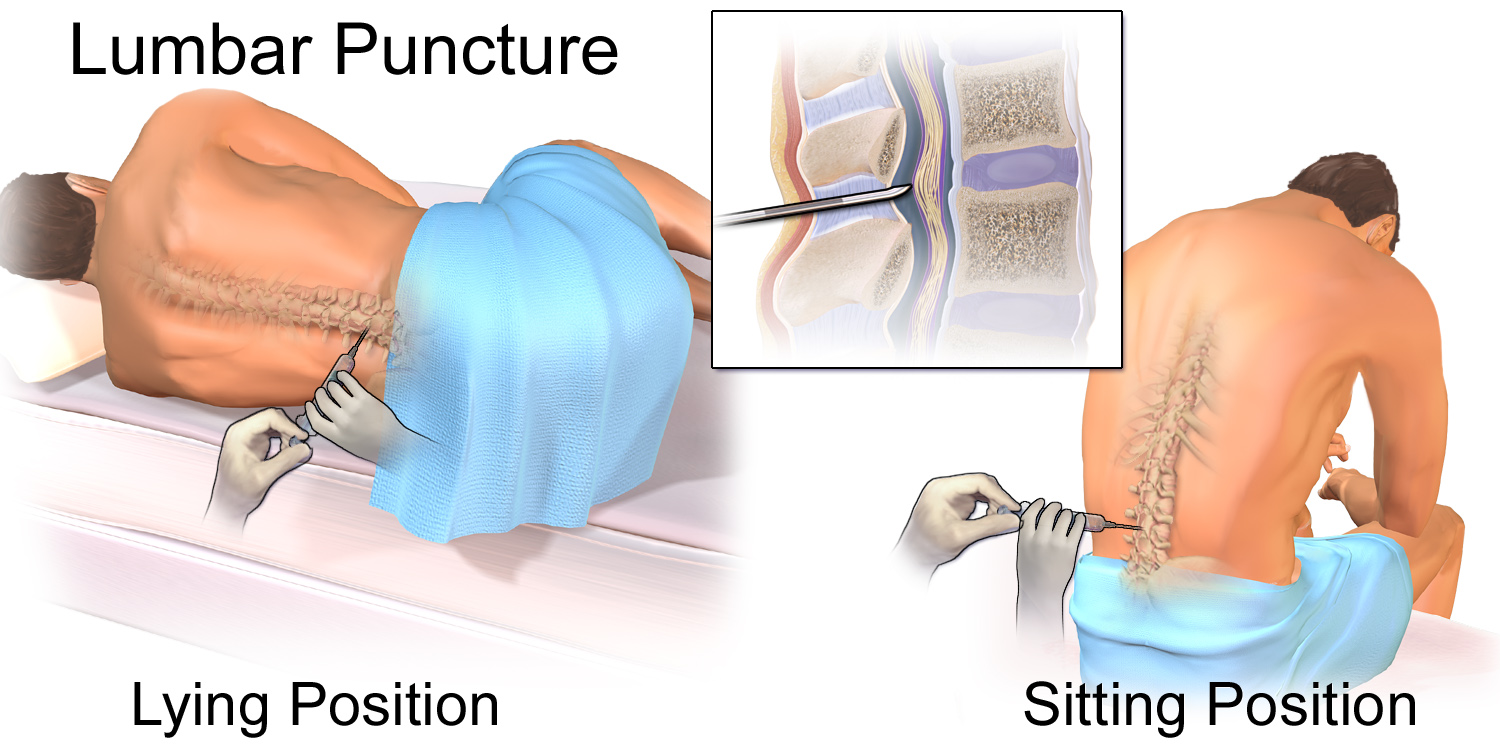
Illustrations of lumbar puncture

The other solution is intrathecal injection of MTX. One method is by surgically implanting under the scalp an Ommaya reservoir, to be attached to a ventricular catheter leading into the ipsilateral anterior horn. The implant provides long-term access to the cerebrospinal fluid and is used for administration of antimicrobials, antifungals, antineoplastic and analgesic medications. Alternatively, MTX may be injected into the intrathecal space via lumbar puncture. After sterilization and local anesthetic, or general anesthesia in paediatric practice, a needle is used to inject MTX between the L3 and L4 or L4 and L5 vertebrae to avoid damage to the conus medullaris.

== Side effects ==
The most common side effects of IV HD-MTX are neutropenia, thrombocytopenia, sore mouth, and kidney and liver dysfunction. These effects gradually disappear upon termination of CNS prophylaxis.

In rare occasions, IV HD-MTX can lead to nephropathy when drug precipitation occurs in renal tubules, causing direct damage. Conditions such as low volume and high acidity of urine increase the risk. Moreover, drugs including NSAIDs, penicillins, probenecid, phenytoin, ciprofloxacin, proton-pump inhibitors, and levetiracetam interact with MTX clearance via kidneys and thus should be avoided.

The toxicity can be mitigated through sufficient hydration, urinary alkalinization, and avoidance of the aforementioned drugs. It is suggested to observe a two-day gap between iodinated contrast used for imaging and IV HD-MTX administration. Other viable options are leucovorin rescue with escalated dosing strategies, and the use of enzyme carboxypeptidase G2 to aid renal clearance of MTX.

For IT-MTX, headaches, nausea, and vomiting are frequently reported. Some less common adverse effects include paresthesias, back pain, infection or fever, syncope or stroke-like symptoms, and hematoma. Patients diagnosed with extranodal diseases have a higher chance of experiencing side effects.

== Risk factors ==
CNS prophylaxis is a standard treatment for fast-growing types of non-Hodgkin lymphoma, such as Burkitt lymphoma or lymphoblastic lymphoma, and is unnecessary for low-grade non-Hodgkin lymphoma or Hodgkin lymphoma. Recent research efforts shed light on the identification of diffuse large B-cell lymphoma (DLBCL) patients who are at high risk of CNS relapse.

=== Clinical risk factors ===
==== CNS-IPI ====
The Central Nervous System – International Prognostic Index (CNS-IPI) has emerged as a valuable tool for risk stratification. Developed by the German High-Grade Non-Hodgkin Lymphoma Study Group (DSHNHL) in 2016, the CNS-IPI integrates factors from the International Prognostic Index (IPI) along with additional considerations such as kidney and adrenal gland involvement. Patients are divided into 3 risk categories – low (0-1), intermediate (2-3), and high (≥4). This scoring system has demonstrated reproducibility in estimating the risk of CNS relapse or progression in DLBCL patients treated with rituximab-based chemotherapy regimens including R-CHOP.

However, it is essential to recognize that CNS-IPI does not encompass all factors contributing to CNS relapse, indicating the need for additional variables to refine patient selection.

==== Anatomical locations ====
Certain anatomical sites exhibit a heightened risk for CNS relapse due to their proximity to the central nervous system or unique immune properties. The most widely recognized sites are the kidney and adrenal glands, which have already been incorporated into the CNS-IPI score. Breast and testicular involvement show growing significance as well. Additionally, involvement of immune-privileged sites such as the CNS, the retina and vitreous in the eye, and testes presents distinct challenges due to anatomical barriers like the blood-brain barrier (BBB), a selectively permeable membrane protecting the brain from potentially harmful blood contents including drugs. DLBCL originating from these sites, termed large B-cell lymphomas of immune-privileged sites, possesses unique molecular and immunophenotypical features contributing to CNS tropism.

Moreover, the involvement of other sites anatomically close to the CNS, such as the head and neck region or epidural areas, has been associated with an increased risk of CNS relapse. While these associations are not as consistently reported across studies, they emphasize the importance of considering anatomical factors in CNS prophylaxis decisions.

=== Biological risk factors ===
==== Cell of origin and molecular biomarkers ====
DLBCL subtypes, particularly the activated B-cell (ABC) subtype, exhibit varying risks of CNS relapse. ABC subtype DLBCL, characterized by gene alterations (at CDKN2A) affecting NF-κB signaling, is associated with worse survival outcomes and increased CNS tropism. Additionally, double-hit or triple-hit lymphomas, defined by chromosomal translocations involving MYC, BCL2, and/or BCL6 oncogenes, confer higher risks of CNS recurrence. Similarly, double-expressor DLBCL, characterized by co-expression of MYC and BCL2, albeit without associated translocations, presents elevated CNS relapse risks, particularly in conjunction with high CNS-IPI scores.

==== Genomic signature ====
Furthermore, genomic signatures such as CDKN2A and ATM deletions, along with NF-κB hyperactivation, have been implicated in promoting CNS tropism. Elevated levels of biomarkers like ITGA10 and PTEN are associated with increased CNS relapses, while others like CD44 and cadherin-11 appear to be protective. Although these findings require further validation, genomic risk assessments utilizing selected genetic panels may aid the identification of high-risk patients warranting CNS prophylaxis.

=== Baseline screening ===
Baseline screening strategies consisting of brain imaging and cerebrospinal fluid (CSF) analysis have emerged as crucial components of CNS prophylaxis protocols. While CSF analysis with flow cytometry instead of cytology improves sensitivity, the need for more sensitive techniques remains apparent, given the proportion of patients experiencing CNS relapse shortly after treatment despite negative results. Recently, molecular analysis on tumour DNA has gained growing popularity.

==== Circulating DNA and clonotypic DNA ====
Detection of ctDNA (circulating tumor DNA) within CSF offers promising directions for early detection of CNS relapse. Notably, ctDNA levels, particularly with MYD88^{L265P} mutation, correlate with treatment response and outcomes, suggesting its potential as a noninvasive biomarker. While CSF analysis improves sensitivity for detecting malignant cells, challenges such as false-negative rates and sample contamination persist. Clonotypic DNA rearrangements of the variable, diversity, and joining (VDJ) regions detected via next-generation sequencing (NGS) assays present another potential biomarker for CNS involvement, even in cases with negative CSF evaluations.

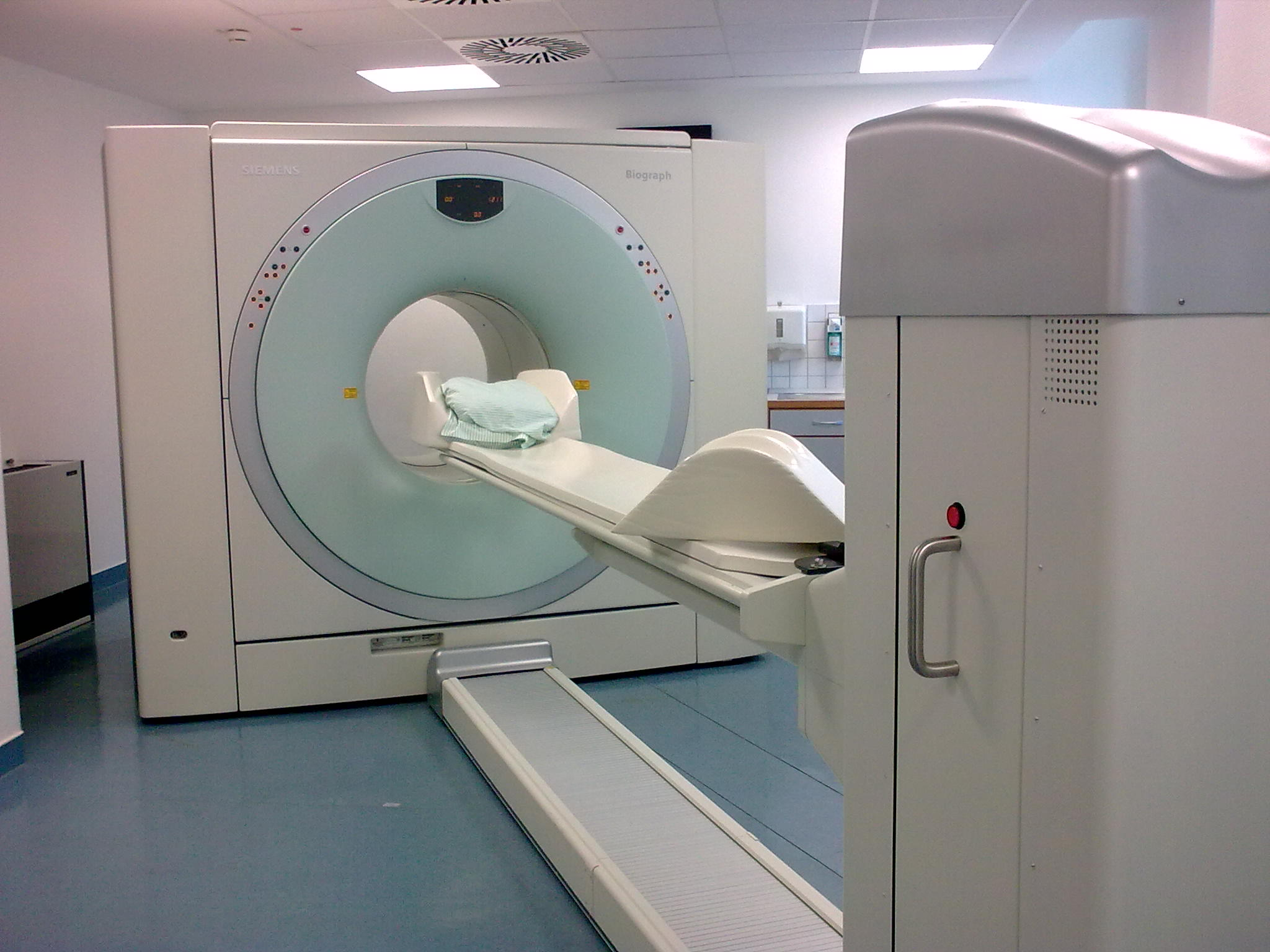
A PET-CT machine

==== Fluorine‑18 fluorodeoxyglucose positron emission tomography/computed tomography (^{18}FDG PET-CT) ====
Metabolic and volumetric parameters obtained from ^{18}FDG PET-CT imaging also offer prognostic insights, particularly when combined with AI models, further enhancing risk stratification for CNS relapse.

== Controversy ==
=== IT-MTX VS no CNS prophylaxis ===
The debate surrounding the efficacy of IT-MTX as CNS prophylaxis in high-risk DLBCL patients remains contentious. While IT-MTX is a standard component in the treatment regimens for Burkitt's lymphoma and acute lymphoblastic leukemia (ALL), its utility in DLBCL, particularly in the era of rituximab, has come under scrutiny. With the increasing proportion of CNS relapses involving brain parenchyma rather than leptomeningeal regions, concerns have been raised regarding the ability of IT-MTX to achieve sufficient intraparenchymal concentrations for effective CNS prophylaxis. Some evidence even suggests an association with infection-related admissions in the elderly. Nevertheless, testicular lymphoma is recommended IT-MTX as an exception since it is correlated with a high risk of CNS relapse.

=== IV HD-MTX VS no CNS prophylaxis ===
While retrospective studies have shown a statistically significant reduction in the 5-year risk of CNS progression with IV HD-MTX, the clinical significance of this reduction remains debatable. Lewis et al. reported a modest reduction in the risk of CNS progression. However, this reduction may not be clinically meaningful for the majority of patients. Moreover, the marginal benefit of IV HD-MTX must be weighed against the associated toxicities and burden on healthcare systems. Conducting randomized controlled trials to conclusively demonstrate the efficacy of IV HD-MTX is challenging due to the low incidence of CNS relapses. Instead, large-scale retrospective analyses may offer more pragmatic insights to guide treatment practices.

=== Challenges and limitations ===
Retrospective studies, despite dominate the current literature, lack the robustness of prospective randomized trials aimed at directly assessing the efficacy of CNS prophylaxis. Furthermore, the CNS-IPI lacks specificity and significant events occur among patients with low to intermediate scores. The applicability of IT-MTX varies across lymphoma subtypes, and caution is warranted in extrapolating findings from DLBCL to other lymphoma entities such as Burkitt lymphoma. Moreover, the shifting understanding of disease biology, including the impact of genetic alterations and tumor microenvironment, further complicates decision-making regarding CNS prophylaxis.
