= PKNOX2 =

Protein-coding gene in the species Homo sapiens

Identifiers
- Aliases: PKNOX2, PREP2, PBX/knotted 1 homeobox 2
- External IDs: OMIM: 613066; MGI: 2445415; GeneCards: PKNOX2

Gene location (Human)
| Chr. | Chromosome 11 (human) |
| Band | 11q24.2 | Start | 125,164,687 bp |
| Band | 11q24.2 | End | 125,433,389 bp |

Gene location (Mouse)
| Chr. | Chromosome 9 (mouse) |
| Band | 9|9 A4 | Start | 36,802,278 bp |
| Band | 9|9 A4 | End | 37,058,703 bp |
RNA expression pattern
| Bgee | Human / Mouse (ortholog); Top expressed in: retinal pigment epithelium; sural nerve; right frontal lobe; primary visual cortex; prefrontal cortex; cartilage tissue; dorsolateral prefrontal cortex; Brodmann area 9; Brodmann area 23; superior frontal gyrus / Top expressed in: muscle of thigh; tail of embryo; gastrula; Gonadal ridge; dentate gyrus of hippocampal formation granule cell; piriform cortex; superior frontal gyrus; lumbar spinal ganglion; skeletal muscle tissue; primary visual cortex; More reference expression data |
| BioGPS | n/a |
Gene ontology
| Molecular function | DNA binding; sequence-specific DNA binding; actin filament binding; actin monomer binding; RNA polymerase II transcription regulatory region sequence-specific DNA binding; DNA-binding transcription factor activity, RNA polymerase II-specific |
| Cellular component | cytoplasm; microtubule cytoskeleton; actin cytoskeleton; nucleus; nucleoplasm; intercellular bridge |
| Biological process | regulation of transcription by RNA polymerase II; regulation of transcription, DNA-templated |
Sources:Amigo / QuickGO
Orthologs
| Databases | NCBI: entry; OMA: entry |
| Species | Human | Mouse |
| Entrez | 63876 | 208076 |
| Ensembl | ENSG00000165495 | ENSMUSG00000035934 |
| UniProt | Q96KN3 | Q8BG99 |
| RefSeq (mRNA) | NM_022062 | NM_001029838; NM_148950 |
| RefSeq (protein) | NP_001369252; NP_001369253; NP_001369254; NP_001369255; NP_001369256 NP_001369257; NP_001369258; NP_001369259; NP_001369260; NP_001369261; NP_001369262; NP_001369263; NP_001369264; NP_001369265; NP_001369266; NP_001369267; NP_001369268; NP_001369269; NP_001369270 | NP_001025009; NP_683752 |
| Location (UCSC) | Chr 11: 125.16 – 125.43 Mb | Chr 9: 36.8 – 37.06 Mb |
| PubMed search |
- Wikidata
| View/Edit Human | View/Edit Mouse |

PBX/Knotted 1 Homeobox 2 (PKNOX2) protein belongs to the three amino acid loop extension (TALE) class of homeodomain proteins, and is encoded by PKNOX2 gene in humans. The protein regulates the transcription of other genes and affects anatomical development.

== Function ==
PKNOX2 protein regulates expression of other genes by binding to DNA in a sequence-specific manner, i.e. to specific DNA sequences. PKNOX2 binds to unique DNA recognition motifs, acting as a nuclear transcription factor. The nuclear transcription factor is a protein that regulates transcription of genetic information from DNA to messenger RNA. Other functions of PKNOX2 include actin filament binding. An important paralog of the PKNOX2 gene is PKNOX1.

== Structure ==
PKNOX2 belongs to the three amino acid loop extension (TALE) class of homeodomain proteins. This class is characterized by a 3-amino acid extension between alpha helix 1 and 2 in the homeodomain.

Homeodomain proteins are sequence-specific transcription factors that share a highly conserved DNA binding domain and regulate cell proliferation, differentiation and death.

== Clinical significance ==
In a 2014 review article of the genome-wide association findings of alcohol dependence, the researchers concluded that based on functional analysis (demonstration of a cause-effect relation), genetic variants related to the PKNOX2 gene may play a role in alcohol dependence risk, albeit a minor role comparing to the role played by the genes located in the alcohol dehydrogenase cluster.

== See also ==
- Homeobox
- Binding to specific DNA sequences
- Human PKNOX2 genome location and PKNOX2 gene details page in the UCSC Genome Browser.
