= ARID5B =

Protein-coding gene in the species Homo sapiens

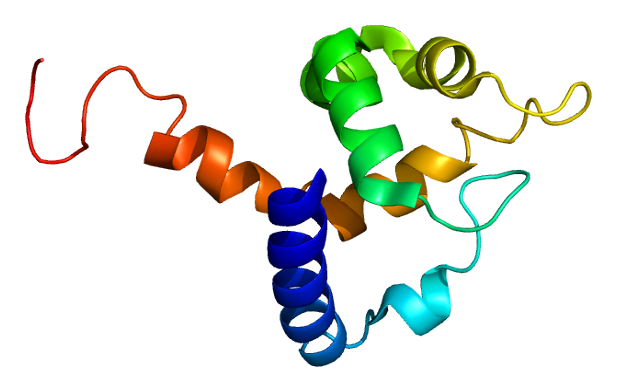

Identifiers
- Aliases: ARID5B, DESRT, MRF-2, MRF2, AT-rich interaction domain 5B
- External IDs: OMIM: 608538; MGI: 2175912; GeneCards: ARID5B
Available structures
PDB	Ortholog search: PDBe RCSB
PDB	List of PDB id codes 1IG6, 2OEH

Gene location (Human)
Chr.	Chromosome 10 (human)
Band	10q21.2	Start	61,901,684 bp
Band	10q21.2	End	62,096,944 bp

Gene location (Mouse)
Chr.	Chromosome 10 (mouse)
Band	10|10 B5.1- B5.2	Start	67,928,350 bp
Band	10|10 B5.1- B5.2	End	68,114,570 bp
RNA expression pattern
Bgee	Human / Mouse (ortholog); Top expressed in: beta cell; saphenous vein; pericardium; vena cava; urethra; parietal pleura; decidua; mucosa of urinary bladder; lactiferous duct; superficial temporal artery / Top expressed in: zygote; left lung lobe; stroma of bone marrow; Paneth cell; ciliary body; secondary oocyte; decidua; ascending aorta; ureter; vas deferens; More reference expression data
BioGPS	n/a
Gene ontology
Molecular function	DNA binding; RNA polymerase II transcription regulatory region sequence-specific DNA binding; transcription coactivator activity; protein binding; DNA-binding transcription repressor activity, RNA polymerase II-specific; histone demethylase activity; DNA-binding transcription factor activity, RNA polymerase II-specific
Cellular component	nucleoplasm; nucleus
Biological process	regulation of transcription, DNA-templated; negative regulation of transcription by RNA polymerase II; transcription, DNA-templated; liver development; negative regulation of transcription, DNA-templated; histone demethylation; kidney development; nitrogen compound metabolic process; male gonad development; female gonad development; post-embryonic development; fibroblast migration; adrenal gland development; multicellular organism growth; fat cell differentiation; platelet-derived growth factor receptor signaling pathway; cell development; muscle organ morphogenesis; skeletal system morphogenesis; positive regulation of DNA-binding transcription factor activity; roof of mouth development; face morphogenesis; adipose tissue development; fat pad development; cellular response to leukemia inhibitory factor; positive regulation of nucleic acid-templated transcription; regulation of transcription by RNA polymerase II
Sources:Amigo / QuickGO
Orthologs
Databases	NCBI: entry; OMA: entry
Species	Human	Mouse
Entrez	84159	71371
Ensembl	ENSG00000150347	ENSMUSG00000019947
UniProt	Q14865	Q8BM75
RefSeq (mRNA)	NM_001244638; NM_032199	NM_023598
RefSeq (protein)	NP_001231567; NP_115575	NP_076087
Location (UCSC)	Chr 10: 61.9 – 62.1 Mb	Chr 10: 67.93 – 68.11 Mb
PubMed search
- Wikidata
View/Edit Human	View/Edit Mouse

AT-rich interactive domain-containing protein 5B is a protein that in humans is encoded by the ARID5B gene.

Alternative names for this gene include Modulator recognition factor 23.

== Genomics ==
The gene is located on the long arm of chromosome 10 (10q21.2) on the 'plus' strand. It spans 195,261 base pairs in length. It encodes a protein of predicted length and molecular weight of 1188 amino acids and 132.375 kilodaltons respectively.

== Clinical importance ==
Through genome wide association studies (GWAS), some of the single nucleotide polymorphisms (SNPs) located in this gene have been noticed to be significantly associated with susceptibility as well as treatment outcomes of childhood acute lymphoblastic leukaemia in ethnically diverse populations.
