= PBX1 =

Protein found in humans

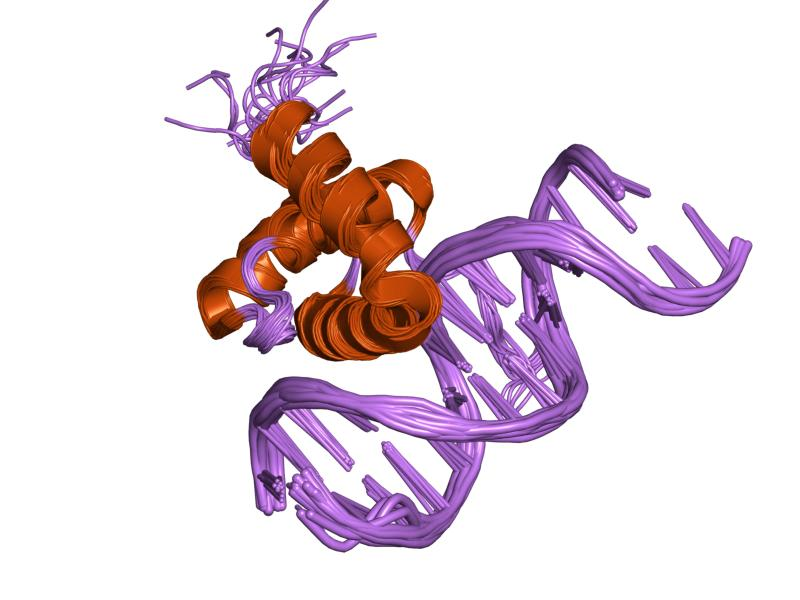

Identifiers
- Aliases: PBX1, PBX homeobox 1, CAKUHED
- External IDs: OMIM: 176310; MGI: 97495; GeneCards: PBX1
Available structures
| PDB | Ortholog search: PDBe RCSB |
| PDB | List of PDB id codes 1B72, 1PUF |

Gene location (Human)
| Chr. | Chromosome 1 (human) |
| Band | 1q23.3 | Start | 164,555,584 bp |
| Band | 1q23.3 | End | 164,899,296 bp |

Gene location (Mouse)
| Chr. | Chromosome 1 (mouse) |
| Band | 1 H2.3|1 75.95 cM | Start | 167,946,933 bp |
| Band | 1 H2.3|1 75.95 cM | End | 168,259,839 bp |
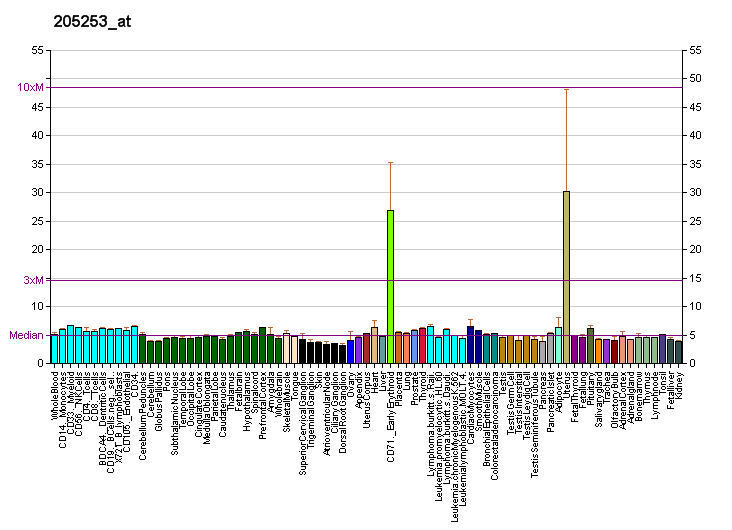
RNA expression pattern
| Bgee | Human / Mouse (ortholog); Top expressed in: tail of epididymis; body of uterus; pars reticulata; ganglionic eminence; buccal mucosa cell; optic nerve; myometrium; canal of the cervix; seminal vesicula; Brodmann area 23 / Top expressed in: Rostral migratory stream; habenula; vas deferens; genital tubercle; olfactory bulb; external carotid artery; median eminence; ventral tegmental area; internal carotid artery; ciliary body; More reference expression data |
| BioGPS | More reference expression data |
Gene ontology
| Molecular function | sequence-specific DNA binding; RNA polymerase II cis-regulatory region sequence-specific DNA binding; protein heterodimerization activity; DNA-binding transcription factor activity; DNA binding; DNA-binding transcription activator activity, RNA polymerase II-specific; transcription factor binding; protein binding; RNA polymerase II transcription regulatory region sequence-specific DNA binding; DNA-binding transcription factor activity, RNA polymerase II-specific |
| Cellular component | cytoplasm; nucleus; transcription regulator complex; nucleoplasm; RNA polymerase II transcription regulator complex |
| Biological process | anterior/posterior pattern specification; proximal/distal pattern formation; positive regulation of G2/M transition of mitotic cell cycle; embryonic organ development; embryonic hemopoiesis; negative regulation of DNA-binding transcription factor activity; transcription, DNA-templated; sex differentiation; multicellular organism development; embryonic limb morphogenesis; somatic stem cell population maintenance; regulation of cell population proliferation; adrenal gland development; spleen development; thymus development; positive regulation of cell population proliferation; urogenital system development; regulation of transcription, DNA-templated; regulation of ossification; positive regulation of transcription by RNA polymerase II; transcription by RNA polymerase II; negative regulation of neuron differentiation; embryonic skeletal system development; branching involved in ureteric bud morphogenesis; steroid biosynthetic process; cell differentiation; animal organ morphogenesis; positive regulation of transcription of Notch receptor target |
Sources:Amigo / QuickGO
Orthologs
| Databases | NCBI: entry; OMA: entry |
| Species | Human | Mouse |
| Entrez | 5087 | 18514 |
| Ensembl | ENSG00000185630 | ENSMUSG00000052534 |
| UniProt | P40424 | P41778 |
| RefSeq (mRNA) | NM_001204961; NM_001204963; NM_002585; NM_001353130; NM_001353131 | NM_001291508; NM_001291509; NM_008783; NM_183355 |
| RefSeq (protein) | NP_001191890; NP_001191892; NP_002576; NP_001340059; NP_001340060 | NP_001278437; NP_001278438; NP_032809; NP_899198 |
| Location (UCSC) | Chr 1: 164.56 – 164.9 Mb | Chr 1: 167.95 – 168.26 Mb |
| PubMed search |
- Wikidata
| View/Edit Human | View/Edit Mouse |

Pre-B-cell leukemia transcription factor 1 is a protein that in humans is encoded by the PBX1 gene. The homologous protein in Drosophila is known as extradenticle, and causes changes in embryonic development.

== Function ==
Mice studies suggest PBX1 is involved in bone generation and skeletal patterning.

== Interactions ==
PBX1 has been shown to interact with:

- HOXB1,
- HOXB7,
- MEIS1, and
- Prep1.

== Fruit fly homolog ==
The Drosophila melangoster gene called extradenticle encodes a homeodomain protein that is 71% similar to the Pbx1 protein, and is considered homologous to PBX1. extradenticle is a homeodomain transcription factor expressed during embryogenesis and is related to morphological changes and development.

Reduced levels of extradenticle cause segmental transformations, without affecting the functionality or location of homeotic genes. Complete removal of extradenticle both maternally and zygotically leads to alterations from failure of non-extradenticle protein expression.

A monoclonal antibody study of the expression of extradenticle protein in embryonic development found that it is uniformly distributed, as well as excluded from cell nuclei, until gastrulation. During the germ band retraction stage of development, extradenticle protein begins to accumulate in the nuclei of cells in a specific pattern. Proximal areas of wing and leg imaginal discs have extradenticle present in the nucleus, while distal areas only have it in the cytoplasm.
