= PBX2 =

Protein found in humans

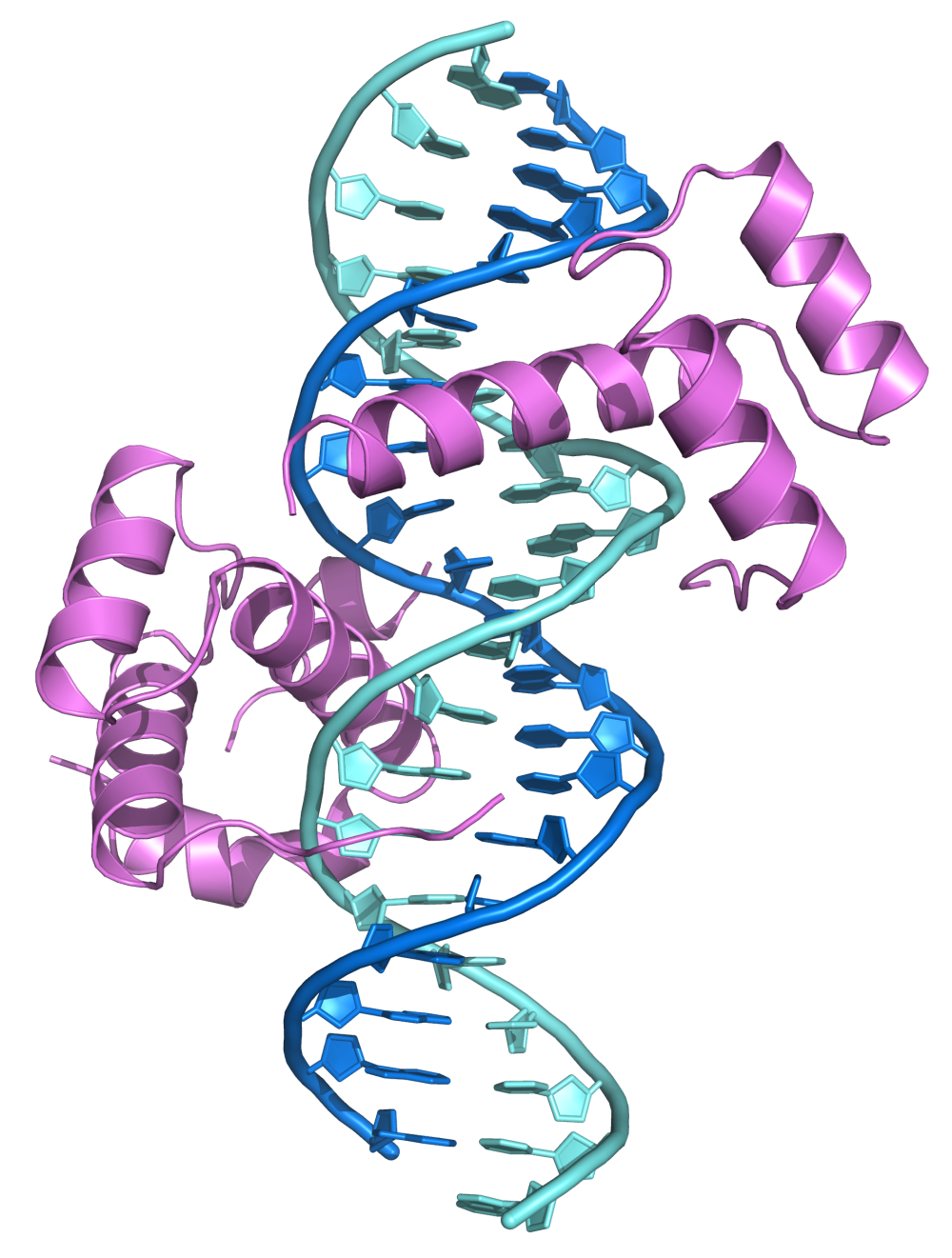

Identifiers
- Aliases: PBX2, G17, HOX12, PBX2MHC, PBX homeobox 2
- External IDs: OMIM: 176311; MGI: 1341793; GeneCards: PBX2

Gene location (Human)
Chr.	Chromosome 6 (human)
Band	6p21.32	Start	32,184,733 bp
Band	6p21.32	End	32,190,202 bp

Gene location (Mouse)
Chr.	Chromosome 17 (mouse)
Band	17|17 B1	Start	34,810,240 bp
Band	17|17 B1	End	34,816,374 bp
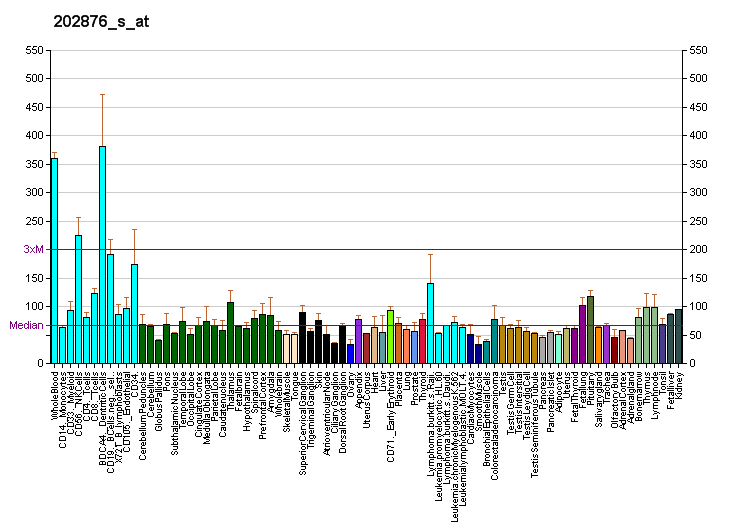

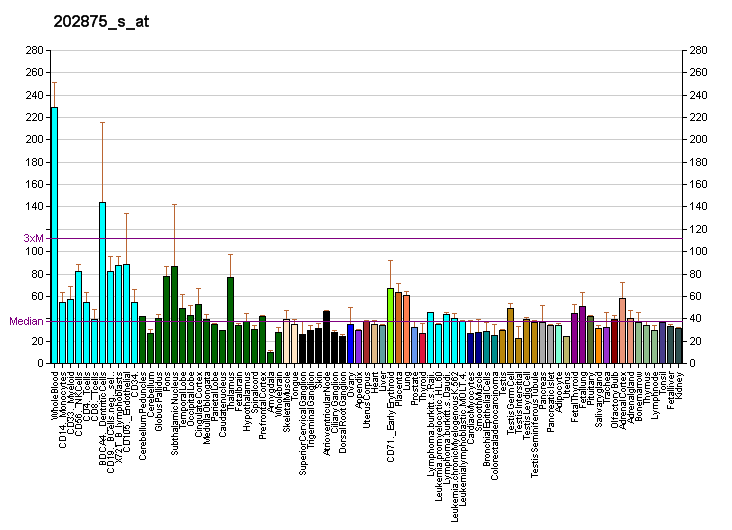

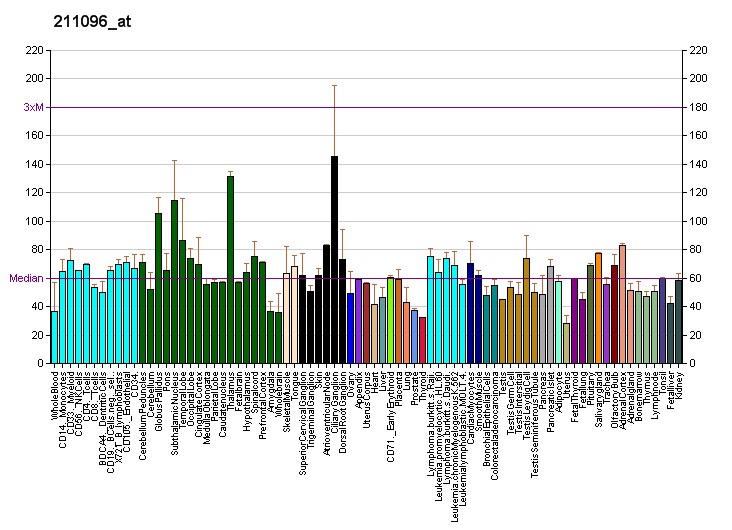
RNA expression pattern
Bgee	Human / Mouse (ortholog); Top expressed in: right lobe of thyroid gland; left lobe of thyroid gland; granulocyte; right ovary; spleen; body of uterus; pituitary gland; left ovary; anterior pituitary; left uterine tube / Top expressed in: genital tubercle; tail of embryo; granulocyte; mandibular prominence; maxillary prominence; somite; saccule; germ layer; ectoderm; otic vesicle; More reference expression data
BioGPS	More reference expression data
Gene ontology
Molecular function	DNA-binding transcription factor activity; sequence-specific DNA binding; DNA binding; transcription factor binding; chromatin binding; protein binding; RNA polymerase II transcription regulatory region sequence-specific DNA binding; DNA-binding transcription activator activity, RNA polymerase II-specific; DNA-binding transcription factor activity, RNA polymerase II-specific
Cellular component	nucleus; transcription regulator complex
Biological process	proximal/distal pattern formation; regulation of transcription, DNA-templated; embryonic limb morphogenesis; transcription, DNA-templated; transcription by RNA polymerase II; positive regulation of transcription by RNA polymerase II
Sources:Amigo / QuickGO
Orthologs
Databases	NCBI: entry; OMA: entry
Species	Human	Mouse
Entrez	5089	18515
Ensembl	ENSG00000224952; ENSG00000237344; ENSG00000236353; ENSG00000232005; ENSG00000225987 ENSG00000206315; ENSG00000204304	ENSMUSG00000034673
UniProt	P40425	O35984
RefSeq (mRNA)	NM_002586	NM_017463
RefSeq (protein)	NP_002577	NP_059491
Location (UCSC)	Chr 6: 32.18 – 32.19 Mb	Chr 17: 34.81 – 34.82 Mb
PubMed search
- Wikidata
View/Edit Human	View/Edit Mouse

Pre-B-cell leukemia transcription factor 2 is a protein that in humans is encoded by the PBX2 gene.

== Function ==
This gene encodes a ubiquitously expressed member of the TALE/PBX homeobox family. It was identified by its similarity to a homeobox gene which is involved in t(1;19) translocation in acute pre-B-cell leukemias. This protein is a transcriptional activator which binds to the TLX1 promoter. The gene is located within the major histocompatibility complex (MHC) on chromosome 6.

== Interactions ==
PBX2 has been shown to interact with HOXA9.
