= PKNOX1 =

Protein-coding gene in the species Homo sapiens

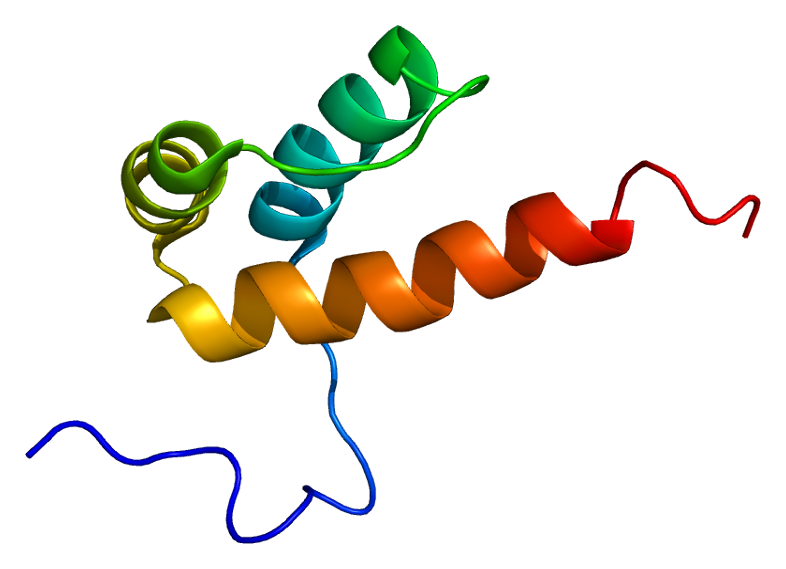

Identifiers
- Aliases: PKNOX1, PREP1, pkonx1c, PBX/knotted 1 homeobox 1
- External IDs: OMIM: 602100; MGI: 1201409; GeneCards: PKNOX1
Available structures
PDB	Ortholog search: PDBe RCSB
PDB	List of PDB id codes 1X2N

Gene location (Human)
Chr.	Chromosome 21 (human)
Band	21q22.3	Start	42,974,510 bp
Band	21q22.3	End	43,033,931 bp

Gene location (Mouse)
Chr.	Chromosome 17 (mouse)
Band	17 B1|17 16.78 cM	Start	31,783,708 bp
Band	17 B1|17 16.78 cM	End	31,826,667 bp
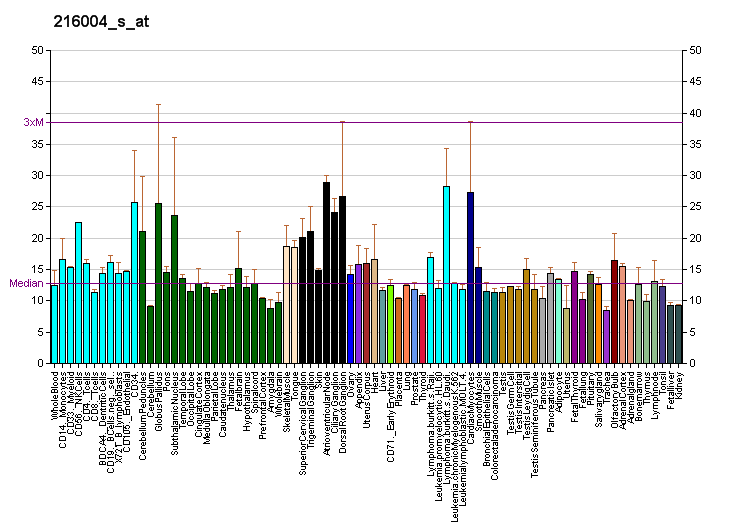

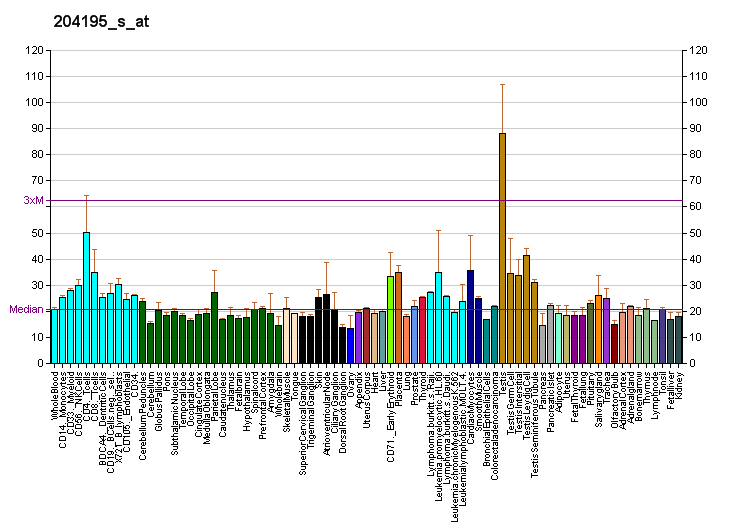

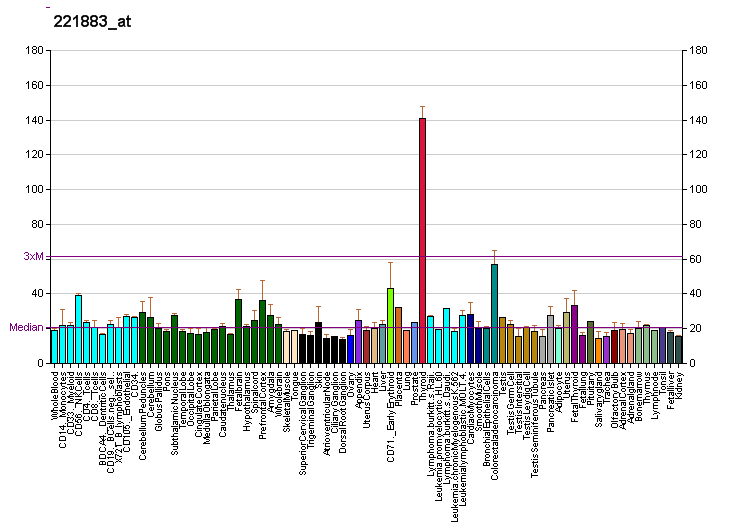
RNA expression pattern
Bgee	Human / Mouse (ortholog); Top expressed in: gonad; right lobe of thyroid gland; testicle; left testis; right testis; left lobe of thyroid gland; ganglionic eminence; ventricular zone; sural nerve; stromal cell of endometrium / Top expressed in: Rostral migratory stream; granulocyte; vas deferens; thymus; internal carotid artery; efferent ductule; spermatocyte; human fetus; blood; external carotid artery; More reference expression data
BioGPS	More reference expression data
Gene ontology
Molecular function	DNA-binding transcription factor activity; DNA-binding transcription activator activity, RNA polymerase II-specific; transcription factor activity, RNA polymerase II distal enhancer sequence-specific binding; sequence-specific DNA binding; DNA binding; protein heterodimerization activity; DNA-binding transcription factor activity, RNA polymerase II-specific; protein binding
Cellular component	cytoplasm; nucleus; transcription regulator complex; cytosol
Biological process	erythrocyte differentiation; regulation of transcription by RNA polymerase II; camera-type eye development; T cell differentiation; regulation of transcription, DNA-templated; angiogenesis; positive regulation of transcription by RNA polymerase II; transcription by RNA polymerase II; hemopoiesis
Sources:Amigo / QuickGO
Orthologs
Databases	NCBI: entry; OMA: entry
Species	Human	Mouse
Entrez	5316	18771
Ensembl	ENSG00000160199	ENSMUSG00000006705
UniProt	P55347; Q96I87	O70477
RefSeq (mRNA)	NM_001286258; NM_004571; NM_001320694; NM_197976	NM_016670
RefSeq (protein)	NP_001273187; NP_001307623; NP_004562; NP_001273187.1; NP_004562.2 NP_001307623.1	NP_057879
Location (UCSC)	Chr 21: 42.97 – 43.03 Mb	Chr 17: 31.78 – 31.83 Mb
PubMed search
- Wikidata
View/Edit Human	View/Edit Mouse

PBX/Knotted 1 Homeobox 1 (PKNOX1) is a protein that in humans is encoded by the PKNOX1 gene.

An important paralog of this gene is PKNOX2.

== Function ==
PKNOX1 belongs to the three amino acid loop extension (TALE) class of homeodomain transcription factors that form transcriptionally active complexes involved in development and organogenesis. PKNOX1 is essential for embryogenesis, but it can also act as a tumor suppressor in adulthood.
