= UBA1 =

Protein-coding gene in the species Homo sapiens

Identifiers
- Aliases: UBA1, A1S9, A1S9T, A1ST, AMCX1, CFAP124, GXP1, POC20, SMAX2, UBA1A, UBE1, UBE1X, ubiquitin like modifier activating enzyme 1
- External IDs: OMIM: 314370; MGI: 98890; GeneCards: UBA1
Available structures
PDB	Ortholog search: PDBe RCSB
PDB	List of PDB id codes 4P22
Enzyme activity
EC #	BRENDA	ExPASy	KEGG	MetaCyc
6.2.1.45	↗	↗	↗	↗

Gene location (Human)
Chr.	X chromosome (human)
Band	Xp11.3	Start	47,190,861 bp
Band	Xp11.3	End	47,215,128 bp

Gene location (Mouse)
Chr.	X chromosome (mouse)
Band	X A1.3|X 16.15 cM	Start	20,524,565 bp
Band	X A1.3|X 16.15 cM	End	20,549,418 bp
RNA expression pattern
Bgee	Human / Mouse (ortholog); Top expressed in: renal medulla; mucosa of pharynx; ventricular zone; right lobe of thyroid gland; ganglionic eminence; nipple; postcentral gyrus; right uterine tube; spinal ganglia; trigeminal ganglion / Top expressed in: tail of embryo; ganglionic eminence; genital tubercle; dentate gyrus of hippocampal formation granule cell; CA3 field; ventricular zone; gastrula; epiblast; habenula; choroid plexus of fourth ventricle; More reference expression data
BioGPS	n/a
Gene ontology
Molecular function	nucleotide binding; ligase activity; protein binding; ubiquitin-like modifier activating enzyme activity; ATP binding; ubiquitin activating enzyme activity; RNA binding
Cellular component	cytoplasm; rough endoplasmic reticulum membrane; desmosome; heterochromatin; lysosomal membrane; mitochondrion; endosome membrane; extracellular exosome; nucleus; nucleoplasm; cytosol
Biological process	cellular response to DNA damage stimulus; protein ubiquitination; ubiquitin-dependent protein catabolic process; protein modification by small protein conjugation; metabolism
Sources:Amigo / QuickGO
Orthologs
Databases	NCBI: entry; OMA: entry
Species	Human	Mouse
Entrez	7317	22201
Ensembl	ENSG00000130985	ENSMUSG00000001924
UniProt	P22314; Q5JRS2	Q02053
RefSeq (mRNA)	NM_003334; NM_153280	NM_001136085; NM_001276316; NM_001276317; NM_009457
RefSeq (protein)	NP_003325; NP_695012	NP_001129557; NP_001263245; NP_001263246; NP_033483
Location (UCSC)	Chr X: 47.19 – 47.22 Mb	Chr X: 20.52 – 20.55 Mb
PubMed search
- Wikidata
View/Edit Human	View/Edit Mouse

Ubiquitin-like modifier activating enzyme 1 (UBA1) is an enzyme which in humans is encoded by the UBA1 gene. UBA1 participates in ubiquitination and the NEDD8 pathway for protein folding and degradation, among many other biological processes. This protein has been linked to X-linked spinal muscular atrophy type 2, neurodegenerative diseases, and cancers.

== Structure ==
=== Gene ===
The UBA1 gene is located in the chromosome band Xp11.23, consisting of 31 exons.

=== Protein ===
The UBA1 for ubiquitin (Ub) is a 110–120 kDa monomeric protein, and the UBA1 for the ubiquitin-like protein (Ubls) NEDD8 and SUMO are heterodimeric complexes with similar molecular weights. All eukaryotic UBA1 contain a two-fold repeat of a domain, derived from the bacterial MoeB and ThiF proteins, with one occurrence each in the N-terminal and C-terminal half of the UBA1 for Ub, or the separate subunits of the UBA1 for NEDD8 and SUMO. The UBA1 for Ub consists of four building blocks: First, the adenylation domains composed of two MoeB/ThiF-homology motifs, the latter of which binds ATP and Ub; second, the catalytic cysteine half-domains, which contain the E1 active site cysteine inserted into each of the adenylation domains; third, a four-helix bundle that represents a second insertion in the inactive adenylation domain and immediately follows the first catalytic cysteine half-domain; and fourth, the C-terminal ubiquitin-fold domain, which recruits specific E2s.

== Function ==
The protein encoded by this gene catalyzes the first step in ubiquitin conjugation, or ubiquitination, to mark cellular proteins for degradation. Specifically, UBA1 catalyzes the ATP-dependent adenylation of ubiquitin, thereby forming a thioester bond between the two. It also continues to participate in subsequent steps of ubiquitination as a Ub carrier. There are only two human ubiquitin-activating enzymes, UBA1 and UBA6, and thus UBA1 is largely responsible for protein ubiquitination in humans. Through its central role in ubiquitination, UBA1 has been linked to cell cycle regulation, endocytosis, signal transduction, apoptosis, DNA damage repair, and transcriptional regulation. Additionally, UBA1 helps regulate the NEDD8 pathway, thus implicating it in protein folding, as well as mitigating the depletion of ubiquitin levels during stress.

== Clinical significance ==
Mutations in UBA1 are associated with X-linked spinal muscular atrophy type 2. UBA1 has also been implicated in other neurodegenerative diseases, including spinal muscular atrophy, as well as cancer and tumors. Since UBA1 is involved in multiple biological processes, there are concerns that inhibiting UBA1 would also damage normal cells. Nonetheless, preclinical testing of a UBA1 inhibitor in mice with leukemia revealed no additional toxic effects to normal cells, and the success of other drugs targeting pleiotropic targets likewise support the safety of using UBA1 inhibitor in cancer treatment

Moreover, the UBA1 inhibitor largazole, as well as its ketone and ester derivatives, preferentially targets cancer over normal cells by specifically blocking the ligation of Ub and UBA1 during the adenylation step of the E1 pathway. MLN4924, a NEDD8-activating enzyme inhibitor functioning according to similar mechanisms, is currently undergoing phase I clinical trials.

An autoinflammatory condition identified in 2020 and named VEXAS syndrome (vacuoles, E1 enzyme, X-linked, autoinflammatory, somatic) is due to mutation in methionine41 in UBA1, the E1 enzyme that initiates ubiquitylation.

== Interactions ==
UBA1 has been shown to interact with:

- UBC13
- PYR-41
- himeic acid A
- hyrtioreticulins A–E
