= David Beck =

David or Dave Beck may refer to:

- David Beck (painter) (1621–1656), Dutch portrait painter
- David Beck (musician) (fl. 1990s–2020s), Australian drummer
- David B. Beck (fl. 2010s–2020s), American physician-scientist
- David L. Beck (born 1953), American leader in the Church of Jesus Christ of Latter-day Saints
- Dave Beck (1894–1993), American labor leader

== See also ==
- Dave Becky (fl. 1990s–2020s), American talent manager
