= Amyoplasia =

Amyoplasia is a condition characterized by a generalized lack of muscular development and growth in the newborn, with contracture and deformity that affect at least two joints. It is the most common form of arthrogryposis.

It is characterized by the four limbs being involved, and by the replacement of skeletal muscle by dense fibrous and adipose tissue. Studies involving amyoplasia have revealed similar findings of the muscle tissue due to various causes including that seen in sacral agenesis and amyotrophic lateral sclerosis. So amyoplasia may also include an intermediate common pathway, rather than the primary cause of the contractures.

== Signs and symptoms ==
Amyoplasia results when a fetus is unable to move sufficiently in the womb. Mothers of children with the disorder often report that the fetus was abnormally still during the pregnancy. The lack of movement in utero (also known as fetal akinesia) allows extra connective tissue to form around the joints and, therefore, the joints become fixed. This extra connective tissue replaces muscle tissue, leading to weakness and giving a wasting appearance to the muscles. Additionally, due to the lack of fetal movement, the tendons that connect the muscles to bone are not able to stretch to their normal length, further limiting joint mobility.

== Causes ==
There is no single factor that is consistently found in the prenatal history of individuals affected with amyoplasia and, in some cases, there is no known cause of the disorder.

Amyoplasia is a sporadic condition that occurs due to lack of fetal movement in the womb. There is no specific gene that is known to cause the disorder. It is thought to be multifactorial, meaning that numerous genes and environmental factors play a role in its development. The recurrence risk is minimal for siblings or children of affected individuals. There have been no reports of recurrent cases of amyoplasia in a family.

The fetal akinesia in amyoplasia is thought to be caused by various maternal and fetal abnormalities. In some cases, the mother's uterus does not allow for adequate fetal movement because of a lack of amniotic fluid, known as oligohydramnios, or an abnormal shape to the uterus, called a bicornuate uterus.

There may also be a myogenic cause to the fetal akinesia, meaning that fetal muscles do not develop properly due to a muscle disease (for example, a congenital muscular dystrophy). Similarly, connective tissue tendon and skeletal defects may contribute to the fetal akinesia and be the primary cause of amyoplasia. Additionally, malformations may occur in the central nervous system and/or spinal cord that can lead to a lack of fetal movement in utero. This neurogenic cause is often accompanied by a wide range of other conditions. Other causes of fetal akinesia may include a maternal fever during pregnancy or a virus.

== Diagnosis ==
It is the most common form of arthrogryposis multiplex congenita (AMC), where multiple joint contractures are present at birth. Arthrogryposis is derived from the Greek word meaning "with crooking of joints." It occurs in about one out of every 3,000 live births. There are more than 150 types of AMC. Amyoplasia accounts for 40% of AMC cases.

=== Characteristic appearance ===
Children with amyoplasia often suffer from internally rotated shoulders, extended elbows, ulnar flexed wrists. The type of displacement of the hips and knees is more variable, and they often have club feet.

About 10% of children with amyoplasia have evidence of vascular compromise including Intestinal atresia, abdominal wall defects, and gastroschisis.

== Treatment ==
Surgery may be necessary to address the congenital deformities frequently occurring in conjunction with arthrogryposis. Surgery on feet, knees, hips, elbows and wrists may also be useful if more range of motion is needed after therapy has achieved maximum results. In some cases, tendon transfers can improve function. Congenital deformities of the feet, hips and spine may require surgical correction at or about one year of age.

== Prognosis ==
Overall prognosis for children with amyoplasia is good. Intensive therapies throughout a child's developing years include physical therapy, occupational therapy and multiple orthopedic procedures. Most children require therapy for years, but almost 2/3 are eventually able to walk, with or without braces, and attend school.
