= Arthrogryposis =

- Other names: Arthrogryposis multiplex congenita (AMC)
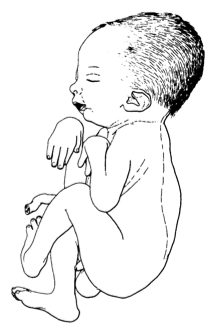
- Drawing of an infant with arthrogryposis
- Specialty: Medical genetics

Arthrogryposis (AMC) is congenital joint contracture in two or more areas of the body. It derives its name from Greek, actually meaning 'curving of joints' (arthron, ἄρθρον, 'joint'; grȳpōsis, late Latin form of late Greek grūpōsis, γρυπῶσις, 'hooking').

Children born with one or more joint contractures have abnormal fibrosis of the muscle tissue causing muscle shortening, and therefore are unable to perform active extension and flexion in the affected joint or joints.

AMC has been divided into three groups: amyoplasia, distal arthrogryposis, and syndromic (is a syndrome or part of a syndrome). Amyoplasia is characterized by severe joint contractures and muscle weakness. Distal arthrogryposis mainly involves the hands and feet. Types of arthrogryposis with a primary neurological or muscle disease belong to the syndromic group.

== Signs and symptoms ==
Often, every joint in a patient with arthrogryposis is affected; in 84% all limbs are involved, in 11% only the legs, and in 4% only the arms are involved. Every joint in the body, when affected, displays typical signs and symptoms: for example, the shoulder (internal rotation); wrist (volar and ulnar); hand (fingers in fixed flexion and thumb in palm); hip (flexed, abducted and externally rotated, frequently dislocated); elbow (extension and pronation) and foot clubfoot and less commonly congenital vertical talus.

Range of motion can be different between joints because of the different deviations. Some types of arthrogryposis like amyoplasia have a symmetrical joint/limb involvement, with normal sensations. The contractures in the joints can result in delayed walking development in the first five years, but severity of contractures do not necessarily predict eventual walking ability or inability.

Intelligence is normal to above normal in children with amyoplasia, but it is not known how many of these children have an above-normal intelligence, and there is no literature available about the cause of this syndrome. There are a few syndromes like the Freeman–Sheldon and Gordon syndrome, which have craniofacial involvement. The amyoplasia form of arthrogryposis is sometimes accompanied with a midline facial hemangioma. Arthrogryposis is not a diagnosis but a clinical finding, so this disease is often accompanied with other syndromes or diseases. These other diagnoses could affect any organ in a patient. There are a few slightly more common diagnoses such as pulmonary hypoplasia, cryptorchidism, congenital heart defects, tracheoesophageal fistulas, inguinal hernias, cleft palate, and eye abnormalities.

== Causes ==
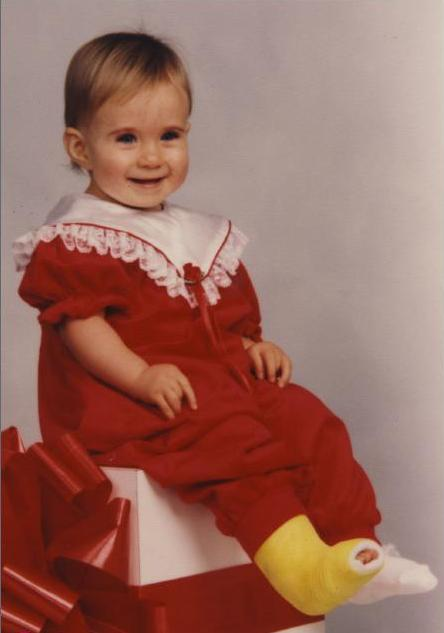
A child with Sheldon–Hall syndrome, a form of arthrogryposis caused by mutations in the MYH3, TNN12, TNNT3 or TPM2 genes

Research of arthrogryposis has shown that anything that inhibits normal joint movement before birth can result in joint contractures. Arthrogryposis could be caused by genetic and environmental factors. In principle: any factor that curtails fetal movement can result in congenital contractures. The exact causes of arthrogryposis are unknown.

=== Extrinsic factors ===
The malformations of arthrogryposis can be secondary to environmental factors such as: decreased intrauterine movement, oligohydramnios (low volume or abnormal distribution of intrauterine fluid), and defects in the fetal blood supply. Other causes could be: hyperthermia, limb immobilization and viral infections. A specific virus that may cause arthrogryposis is contraction of the Zika virus during pregnancy. Congenital Zika syndrome (CZS), may occur when there is vertical transmission of the Zika virus to the fetus. Myasthenia gravis of the mother leads also in rare cases to arthrogryposis. The major cause in humans is fetal akinesia; however, this is disputed lately.

=== Intrinsic factors ===
Arthrogryposis could also be caused by intrinsic factors. This includes molecular, muscle- and connective tissue development disorders or neurological abnormalities.

=== Molecular basis ===
Research has shown that there are more than 35 specific genetic disorders associated with arthrogryposis. Most of those mutations are missense, which means the mutation results in a different amino acid. Other mutations that could cause arthrogryposis are: single gene defects (X-linked recessive, autosomal recessive and autosomal dominant), mitochondrial defects and chromosomal disorders (for example: trisomy 18). This is mostly seen in distal arthrogryposis. Mutations in at least five genes (TNN12, TNNT3, TPM2, MYH3 and MYH8) could cause distal arthrogryposis. There could be also connective tissue, neurological or muscle development disorders.

=== Muscle and connective tissue development disorders ===
Loss of muscle mass with an imbalance of muscle power at the joint can lead to connective tissue abnormality. This leads to joint fixation and reduced fetal movement. Also muscle abnormalities could lead to a reduction of fetal movement. Those could be: dystrophy, myopathy and mitochondrial disorders. This is mostly the result of abnormal function of the dystrophin-glycoprotein-associated complex in the sarcolemma of skeletal muscles.

=== Neurological abnormalities ===
Seventy to eighty percent of cases of the most severe forms of arthrogryposis are caused by neurological abnormalities, which can be either genetic or environmental.

The underlying aetiology and pathogenesis of congenital contractures, particularly arthrogryposis and the mechanism of the mutations remains an active area of investigation, because identifying these factors could help to develop treatment and congenital finding of arthrogryposis.

== Diagnosis ==
Research on prenatal diagnosis has shown that a diagnosis can be made prenatally in approximately 50% of fetuses presenting arthrogryposis. It could be found during routine ultrasound scanning showing a lack of mobility and abnormal position of the foetus. There are other options for visualization of details and structures using techniques such as 4D ultrasound. In clinic a child can be diagnosed with arthrogryposis with physical examination, confirmed by ultrasound, MRI, or muscle biopsy.

=== Classification ===
Some of the different types of AMC include:

- Arthrogryposis multiplex due to muscular dystrophy.
- Arthrogryposis ectodermal dysplasia other anomalies, also known as Cote Adamopoulos Pantelakis syndrome, Trichooculodermovertebral syndrome, TODV syndrome and Alves syndrome.
- Arthrogryposis epileptic seizures migrational brain disorder.
- Arthrogryposis IUGR thoracic dystrophy, also known as Van Bervliet syndrome.
- Arthrogryposis-like disorder, also known as Kuskokwim disease.
- Arthrogryposis-like hand anomaly and sensorineural deafness.
- Arthrogryposis multiplex congenita CNS calcification.
- Arthrogryposis multiplex congenita distal (AMCD), also known as X-linked spinal muscular atrophy type 2.
- Gordon syndrome, also known as distal arthrogryposis type 3.
- Arthrogryposis multiplex congenita, distal type 2A, also known as Freeman–Sheldon syndrome.
- Arthrogryposis multiplex congenita, distal type 2B, also known as Sheldon–Hall syndrome.
- Arthrogryposis multiplex congenita neurogenic type (AMCN). This particular type of AMC has been linked to the AMCN gene on locus 5q35.
- Arthrogryposis multiplex congenita pulmonary hypoplasia, also with a large number of synonyms.
- Arthrogryposis multiplex congenita whistling face, also known as Illum syndrome.
- Arthrogryposis multiplex congenita, distal type 1 (AMCD1).
- Arthrogryposis multiplex with deafness, inguinal hernias, and early death. This syndrome is suspected to be inherited in an X-linked or autosomal recessive fashion. There were only three reported cases with all three patients dead.
- Arthrogryposis ophthalmoplegia retinopathy, also known as Oculomelic amyoplasia.
- Arthrogryposis renal dysfunction cholestasis syndrome, also known as ARC Syndrome.

Another form has been related to mutations in the leucine-rich glioma-inactivated 4 (LGI4) gene.

== Treatment ==
The treatment of arthrogryposis includes occupational therapy, physical therapy, splinting and surgery. An approach that occupational therapists use is orthopedic management. Using casts in order to correct joint deformities can be very effective since the joints can be misaligned and present with deformities. Another vital intervention that occupational therapists use to treat arthrogryposis, is range of motion exercises. This is in order to increase joint mobility. The primary long-term goals of these treatments are increasing joint mobility and muscle strength and the development of adaptive use patterns that allow for walking and independence with activities of daily living. Since arthrogryposis has many different types, the treatment varies between patients depending on the symptoms.

=== Passive enhancement ===
There are a number of passive devices for enhancing limb movement, intended to be worn to aid movement and encourage muscular development. For example, the Wilmington Robotic Exoskeleton is a potential assistive device built on a back brace, shadowing the upper arm and forearm. It can be difficult to fit and heavy and awkward to wear.

Researchers at the University of Delaware are developing a light and unobtrusive therapeutic garment, suitable for babies and children, called the Playskin Lift. The garment looks like normal clothing but contains bundled steel wires under the arms, which help to push the arms toward a lifted position while allowing the wearer to move freely from that position.

=== Wrist surgery ===
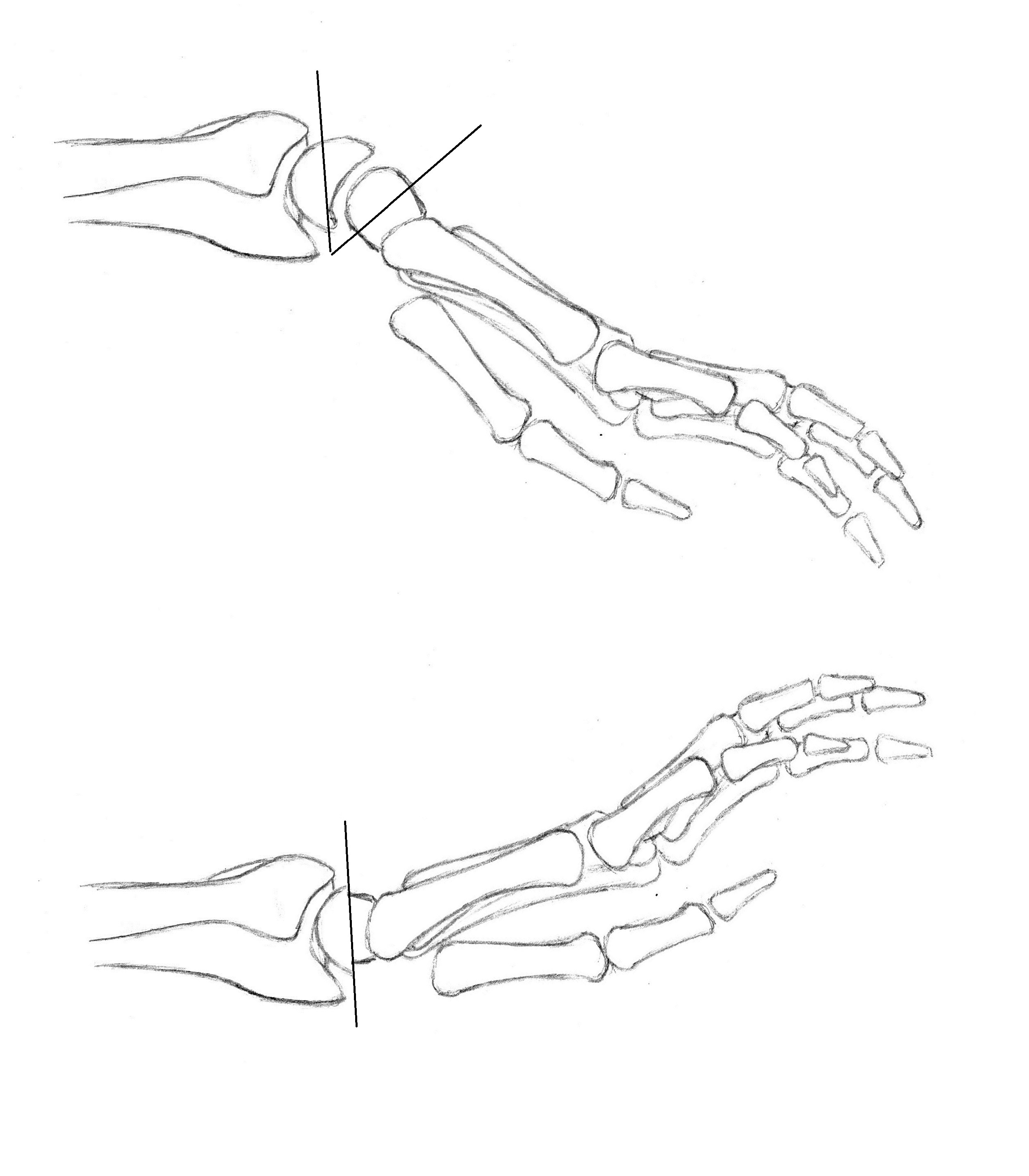
Dorsal carpal wedge osteotomy

Children with the amyoplasia type of arthrogryposis usually have flexion and ulnar deviation of the wrists. Dorsal carpal wedge osteotomy is indicated for wrists with excessive flexion contracture deformity when non-surgical interventions such as occupational therapy and splinting have failed to improve function. On the dorsal side, at the level of the midcarpus, a wedge osteotomy is made. Sufficient bone is resected to at least be able to put the wrist in a neutral position. If the wrist also has ulnar deviation, more bone can be taken from the radial side to correct this abnormality. This position is held into place with two cross K-wires. In addition, a tendon transfer of the extensor carpi ulnaris to the extensor carpi radialis brevis may be performed to correct ulnar deviation or wrist extension weakness, or both. This tendon transfer is only used if the extensor carpi ulnaris appears to be functional enough.

=== Thumb surgery ===
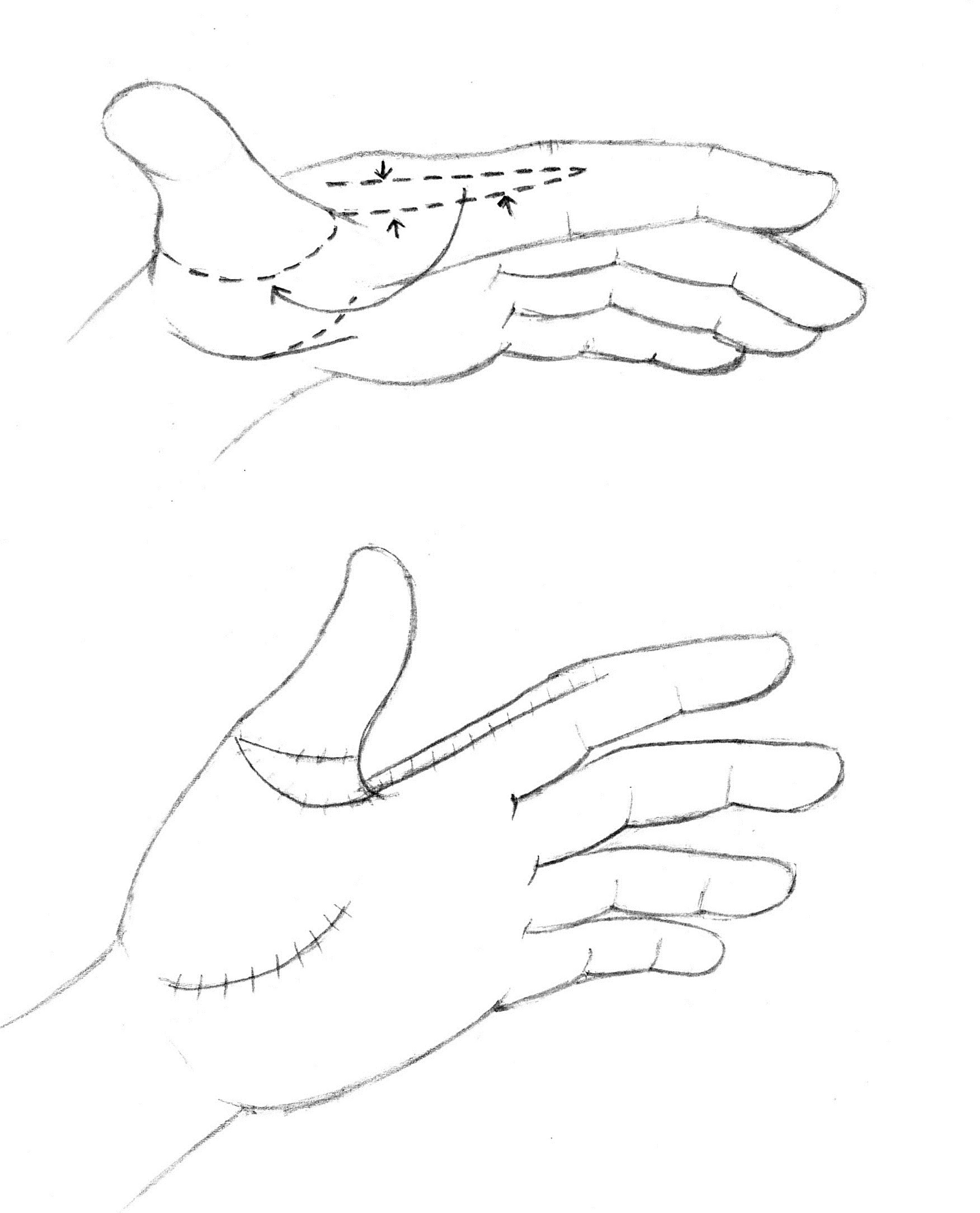
Index rotation flap

The soft tissue envelope in congenital contractual conditions such as clasped or arthrogrypotic thumbs is often deficient in two planes, the thumb-index web and the flexor aspect of the thumb. There is often an appearance of increased skin at the base of the index finger that is part of the deformity. This tissue can be used to resurface the thumb-index web after a comprehensive release of all the tight structures to allow for a larger range of motion of the thumb. This technique is called the index rotation flap.

The flap is taken from the radial side of the index finger. It is proximally based at the distal edge of the thumb-index web. The flap is made as wide as possible, but still small enough to close with the excessive skin on the palmar side of the index finger. The flap is rotated around the tightest part of the thumb to the metacarpophalangeal joint of the thumb, allowing for a larger range of motion.

=== Foot surgeries ===
Generally, foot surgery is usually reserved for patients with a walking or ambulatory potential. Foot surgery may also be indicated to assist brace and orthosis fitting and hence promote supported standing. The most common foot deformity in arthrogryposis is club feet or talipes equinovarus. In the early years of life the serial casting according to the Ponseti method usually yields good results. The Ponseti method can also be used as a first line treatment in older and more resistant cases. In such severe and neglected cases bony surgery in the form of foot osteotomies and arthrodesis is usually indicated. It is usually accompanied by soft tissue surgery in the form of release of contracted tendon and capsular structures. In older patients near skeletal maturity joint fusion or arthrodesis may be indicated as well. Less frequent patients with arthrogryposis may develop congenital vertical talus also known as rocker bottom foot. Similarly, congenital vertical talus is classically managed by serial casting according to the reversed Ponseti method. Resistant or recurrent cases may be offered an extensive soft tissue release. However this is fraught with risk of foot stiffness and pain in the long term. Talectomy or excision of the talus to give room for creation of plantigrade foot has been practiced. Naviculectomy or midtarsal resection arthroplasty represents a less invasive option with satisfactory short-term results.

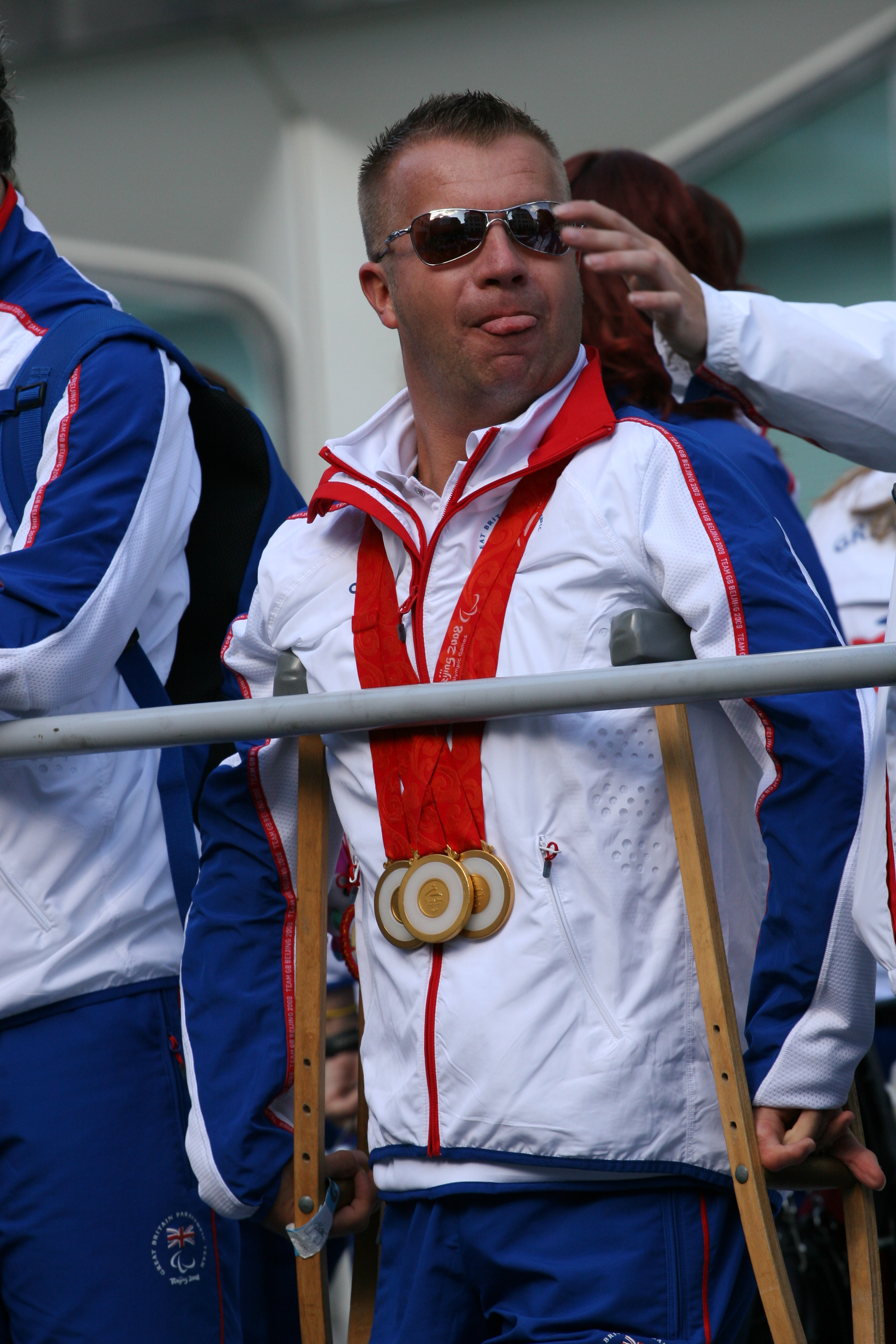
Lee Pearson, a ten-time Paralympic Games gold medallist born with arthrogryposis

== Prognosis ==
AMC is considered non-progressive, so with proper medical treatment things can improve. The joint contractures will not get worse than they are at the time of birth. There is no way to resolve or cure AMC completely but with proper treatment most children make significant improvements in their range of motion and ability to move their limbs, which enables them to carry out daily activities and live relatively normal lives.

Therapeutic interventions that are cornerstones in the treatment of AMC include: stretching and range of motion exercises, physical, occupational and speech therapy, splinting and serial casting. Surgical intervention may also improve joint mobility and function. Other positive prognostic factors for independent walking are active hips and knees, hip flexion contractures of less than 20 degrees and knee flexion contractures of less than 15 degrees without severe scoliosis.

== Epidemiology ==
Arthrogryposis is a rare condition. Some authors say the overall prevalence is one in 3,000 and others say it is one in 11,000–12,000 among European live births. Congenital clubfoot is the most common single contracture and its prevalence is one in 500 live births.

== See also ==
- X-linked spinal muscular atrophy type 2
- Boaz Kramer (born 1978), Israeli Paralympic medalist wheelchair tennis player born with arthrogryposis
