= HOXA3 =

Protein-coding gene in the species Homo sapiens

Identifiers
- Aliases: HOXA3, HOX1, HOX1E, homeobox A3
- External IDs: OMIM: 142954; MGI: 96175; GeneCards: HOXA3

Gene location (Human)
Chr.	Chromosome 7 (human)
Band	7p15.2	Start	27,106,184 bp
Band	7p15.2	End	27,152,581 bp

Gene location (Mouse)
Chr.	Chromosome 6 (mouse)
Band	6 B3|6 25.4 cM	Start	52,146,042 bp
Band	6 B3|6 25.4 cM	End	52,190,316 bp
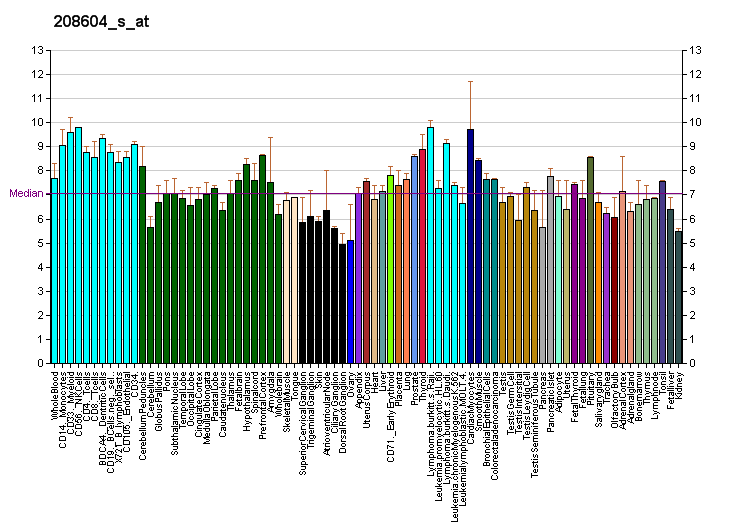
RNA expression pattern
Bgee	Human / Mouse (ortholog); Top expressed in: caput epididymis; corpus epididymis; right uterine tube; left uterine tube; parietal pleura; renal medulla; tibia; Descending thoracic aorta; visceral pleura; gastric mucosa / Top expressed in: ascending aorta; aortic valve; tail of embryo; tunica albuginea of testis; thoracic vertebral column; thyroid gland; lumbar subsegment of spinal cord; genital tubercle; rete testis; left lung lobe; More reference expression data
BioGPS	More reference expression data
Gene ontology
Molecular function	sequence-specific DNA binding; DNA binding; DNA-binding transcription factor activity; HMG box domain binding; protein binding; DNA-binding transcription factor activity, RNA polymerase II-specific; RNA polymerase II cis-regulatory region sequence-specific DNA binding
Cellular component	nucleoplasm; nucleus
Biological process	embryonic skeletal system morphogenesis; glossopharyngeal nerve morphogenesis; regulation of transcription, DNA-templated; thymus development; transcription, DNA-templated; embryonic skeletal system development; multicellular organism development; animal organ formation; blood vessel remodeling; thyroid gland development; cartilage development; parathyroid gland development; angiogenesis; positive regulation of cell population proliferation; animal organ morphogenesis; specification of animal organ position; anterior/posterior pattern specification; regulation of transcription by RNA polymerase II; calcium ion transport; gene expression; magnesium ion homeostasis; bone mineralization; negative regulation of calcium ion transport; phosphate ion homeostasis; calcium ion homeostasis; positive regulation of receptor binding; positive regulation of transcription by RNA polymerase II
Sources:Amigo / QuickGO
Orthologs
Databases	NCBI: entry; OMA: entry
Species	Human	Mouse
Entrez	3200	15400
Ensembl	ENSG00000105997	ENSMUSG00000079560
UniProt	O43365	P02831
RefSeq (mRNA)	NM_030661; NM_153631; NM_153632	NM_010452
RefSeq (protein)	NP_109377; NP_705895	NP_034582
Location (UCSC)	Chr 7: 27.11 – 27.15 Mb	Chr 6: 52.15 – 52.19 Mb
PubMed search
- Wikidata
View/Edit Human	View/Edit Mouse

Homeobox protein Hox-A3 is a protein that in humans is encoded by the HOXA3 gene.

== Function ==
In vertebrates, the genes encoding the class of transcription factors called homeobox genes are found in clusters named A, B, C, and D on four separate chromosomes. Expression of these proteins is spatially and temporally regulated during embryonic development. This gene is part of the A cluster on chromosome 7 and encodes a DNA-binding transcription factor which may regulate gene expression, morphogenesis, and differentiation. Three transcript variants encoding two different isoforms have been found for this gene.

During normal fetal development, HoxA3 is expressed in mesenchymal neural crest cells and endodermal cells found in the third pharyngeal pouch. Expression of HoxA3 in these cells affects the proper formation of the thymus, thyroid, and parathyroid organs. While the gene does not seem to affect the proliferation or migration of the pharyngeal neural crest cells, it does appear to trigger cellular differentiation events required to form these organs. Knockout of HoxA3 leads to failure in forming the thymus (athymia) and parathyroid gland (aparthyroidism). Mutant HoxA3 also causes a reduction in thyroid size. While the follicular and parafollicular cells still differentiate, their numbers are reduced and they are not evenly distributed throughout the gland. Mutant HoxA3 models show similar phenotypes as those seen in DiGeorge's syndrome, and it is possible that the two are linked.

== Regulation ==
The HOXA3 gene is repressed by the microRNA miR-10a.

== See also ==
- Homeobox
