= VEXAS syndrome =

Auto-inflammatory syndrome

VEXAS syndrome is an adult-onset autoinflammatory disease primarily affecting males, caused by a somatic mutation of the UBA1 gene in hematopoietic progenitor cells.

== Etymology ==
The name VEXAS is an acronym deriving from the core features of disease:

- V: Vacuoles are often identified in the bone marrow stem cells of patients presenting with VEXAS.
- E: The E1 ubiquitin conjugating enzyme encoded by the UBA1 gene is mutated in patients.
- X: The mutated UBA1 gene is recessive and located on the X-chromosome and thus the disease is almost exclusively found in individuals with a single X chromosome and thus said to be X-linked.
- A: Patients with VEXAS present with a wide array of autoinflammatory conditions
- S: The mutations which cause VEXAS are somatic: they are acquired throughout life, not inherited, and are not passed on to offspring.

== Signs and symptoms ==
The disease arises in late adulthood (typically after the age of 50) and causes both autoinflammatory and hematologic symptoms. Fever and skin conditions—particularly rashes resembling those seen in Sweet syndrome—are common signs. Other autoinflammatory conditions that can occur in individuals with VEXAS syndrome include periorbital angioedema, uveitis and scleritis, relapsing polychondritis, and polyarteritis nodosa. Inflammation may also affect the lungs.

Hematologic issues include macrocytic anemia, a low platelet count, and a predisposition towards developing hematologic malignancies, especially myelodysplastic syndrome. On bone marrow examination, people with the disease exhibit abnormal vacuoles in precursor cells of the myeloid and erythroid lineages.

== Treatment ==
VEXAS syndrome becomes more severe over time and carries a high mortality rate. Symptoms can be managed with high-dose corticosteroid therapy, but this can cause serious adverse effects, and symptoms typically recur after the dosage is lowered. For this reason, a variety of alternative treatments were under investigation as of 2021.

More recent reviews describe VEXAS as a disease at the intersection of clonal hematopoiesis, bone marrow failure, and innate immune dysregulation. Somatic UBA1 mutations impair ubiquitination and protein homeostasis, leading to endoplasmic reticulum stress and activation of inflammatory pathways. Treatment remains challenging: glucocorticoids often control inflammation but are frequently difficult to taper, while steroid-sparing approaches such as interleukin-1 blockade, interleukin-6 inhibition, Janus kinase inhibitors, and hypomethylating agents have been reported with variable responses. Allogeneic hematopoietic stem cell transplantation is considered the only potentially curative treatment, although patient selection and transplant-related risk remain important limitations.

== Discovery ==
The syndrome was identified by a multidisciplinary team of clinicians and scientists led by David B. Beck, Peter Grayson, and Daniel L. Kastner. The supplemental section of the journal article of the discovery elucidates that the initial discovery of the mutation was made by Daron Ross in the first 2 patients identified. It was first reported in The New England Journal of Medicine in October 2020 where Beck et al wrote: "Using a genotype-driven approach, we identified a disorder that connects seemingly unrelated adult-onset inflammatory syndromes".

An editorial in the same issue describes the work as a "fascinating discovery" which "is of immediate importance to rheumatologists and has far-reaching consequences of general clinical interest. It builds on previous findings suggesting that postzygotic somatic mutation may be a more frequent cause of human disease than previously recognized". In 2022, the American Society of Hematology deemed the discovery of VEXAS the "year's best advancement in hematology-related diagnoses", and that researching VEXAS would potentially improve the classification of hematologic (blood-based) and adult-onset recurrent autoimmune diseases such as relapsing polychondritis.

== Investigations ==
Since VEXAS was first described in 2020, there has been global interest in understanding the disease. In 2022 the National Cancer Institute announced a three-year clinical trial to evaluate stem cell transplant as a possible treatment for patients with VEXAS. Scientists, including David B. Beck, one of the original discoverers, at the New York University Grossman School of Medicine and NYU Langone Health were also actively researching the condition.
