= Mir-10 microRNA precursor family =

Short non-coding RNA gene

mir-10
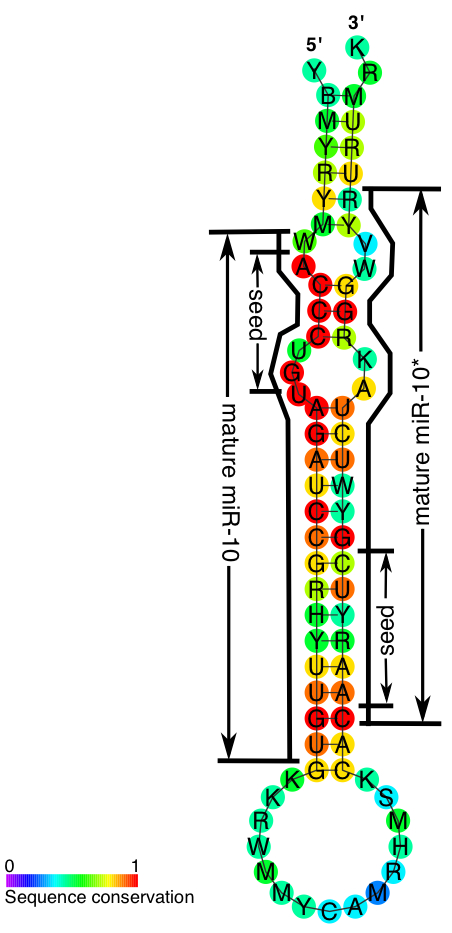
- Conserved secondary structure of the mir-10 miRNA. Including marking up the mature miR and miR* sequences and corresponding seeds.

Identifiers
- Symbol: miR-10
- Alt. Symbols: miR-51, miR-57, miR-99, miR-100
- Rfam: RF00104
- miRBase family: MIPF0000033
- HGNC: 31497
- OMIM: 610173

Other data
- RNA type: microRNA
- Domain(s): Eukaryota; Metazoa
- PDB structures: PDBe

The mir-10 microRNA precursor is a short non-coding RNA gene involved in gene regulation. It is part of an RNA gene family which contains mir-10, mir-51, mir-57, mir-99 and mir-100. mir-10, mir-99 and mir-100 have now been predicted or experimentally confirmed in a wide range of species. (MIPF0000033, MIPF0000025) miR-51 and miR-57 have currently only been identified in the nematode Caenorhabditis elegans (MIPF0000268, MIPF0000271).

MicroRNAs are transcribed as ~70 nucleotide precursors and subsequently processed by the Dicer enzyme to give a ~22 nucleotide product. In this case the mature sequence comes from the 5' arm of the precursor. The mature products are thought to have regulatory roles through complementarity to mRNA.

== Species distribution ==
The presence of miR-10 has been detected in a diverse range of bilaterian animals. It is one of the most widely distributed microRNAs in animals, it has been identified in numerous species including human, dog, cat, horse, cow, guinea pig, mouse, rat, common marmoset (Callithrix jacchus), common chimpanzee (Pan troglodytes), rhesus monkey (Macaca mulatta), Sumatran orangutan (Pongo abelii), northern greater galago (Otolemur garnettii), gray short-tailed opossum (Monodelphis domestica), northern treeshrew (Tupaia belangeri), European rabbit (Oryctolagus cuniculus), African bush elephant (Loxodonta africana), nine-banded armadillo (Dasypus novemcinctus), European hedgehog (Erinaceus europaeus), lesser hedgehog tenrec (Echinops telfairi), zebra finch (Taeniopygia guttata), chicken, platypus (Ornithorhynchus anatinus), Western clawed frog (Xenopus tropicalis), Carolina anole (Anolis carolinensis), zebrafish (Danio rerio), Japanese pufferfish (Fugu rubripes), green spotted pufferfish (Tetraodon nigroviridis), Japanese killifish (Oryzias latipes), three-spined stickleback (Gasterosteus aculeatus), Florida lancelet (Branchiostoma floridae), California purple sea urchin (Strongylocentrotus purpuratus), 12 different species of fruit fly (Drosophila), Western honey bee (Apis mellifera), mosquito (Anopheles gambiae), red flour beetle (Tribolium castaneum), the nematode Caenorhabditis elegans, owl limpet (Lottia gigantea), starlet sea anemone (Nematostella vectensis) and the blood fluke Schistosoma japonicum. In some of these species the presence of miR-10 has been shown experimentally, in others the genes encoding miR-10 have been predicted computationally.

== Genomic location ==
The mir-10 genes are found within the Hox gene clusters. In mammals there are four Hox gene clusters, these contain five genes encoding miRNAs (mir-10a, mir-10b, mir-196a-1, mir-196a-2 and mir-196b). The mir-10a gene is located upstream of Hoxb4 and the mir-10b gene is located upstream of Hoxd4. Zebrafish have seven Hox gene clusters, genes encoding miR-10 (mir-10a, mir-10b-1, mir-10b-2 and mir-10c) are found in the Hox Ba, Bb, Ca and Da clusters. A fourth miR-10 gene (mir-10d) is found elsewhere in the genome, at a location homologous to the pufferfish HoxDd cluster.

== miR-10* ==
A miRNA can be derived from each arm of the pre-miRNA hairpin. Historically, the least common of these two miRNA products was denoted by the addition of * to the miRNA name, however the modern convention is to denote mature miRNA products as 5p or 3p. Both mir-10 and mir-10* have been detected in Drosophila. There are many potential targets for miR-10* in Drosophila, including several Hox genes, indicating that miR-10* may also be functional. In Drosophila most mature miR-10 sequences are produced from the 3' arm of the precursor while in the beetle Tribolium castaneum most production comes from the 5' arm. These changes of arm preference during evolution are termed arm switching events, and they are relatively frequent during the evolution of microRNAs.

== Pattern of expression ==
In adult animals, expression of miR-10 is limited to specific organs. The highest levels of miR-10a and miR-10b have been found in the kidneys of mice. Lower levels of miR-10a are seen in small intestine, lung and spleen, and lower levels of miR-10b are seen in skeletal muscle. Expression of miR-10b has also been detected in the ovaries. Adult zebrafish express miR-10a in heart, testis and ovary, and miR-10b in muscle and liver.

In developing embryos, miR-10 is detected at specific stages. Zebrafish embryos show miR-10a expression from 48 to 120 hours post-fertilisation, and miR-10b expression from 12 to 120 hours post-fertilisation. In Drosophila expression of miR-10-3p is highest in 12- to 24-hour-old embryos and in 1st and 3rd instar larvae. Levels of miR-10-5p are highest in 12- to 24-hour-old embryos and much lower in larvae.

In stage 5 Drosophila embryos (130–180 minutes post-fertilisation), miR-10 is distributed throughout 50-80% of the length of the egg. Later in development miRNA-10 becomes localised into bands, and levels decrease by stage 7 (195–200 minutes post-fertilisation). miR10 reappears by stage 11 (320–440 minutes post-fertilisation), where it is found in the ventral nerve cord, posterior midgut and hindgut. At stage 14 (620–680 hours post-fertilisation), miRNA-10 is localised to the posterior midgut and the anal pad. In Drosophila larvae, miR-10-3p is found in the imaginal discs (groups of cells which are destined to become adult structures upon metamorphosis). Expression of miR-10ba in mouse embryos shows a similar pattern to that of the Hoxb4 gene. Highest levels are found in the posterior trunk of the embryo, surrounding the hindlimb buds. Similarly, expression is restricted to the posterior trunk of chicken embryos. In Zebrafish embryos expression of miR-10 is also restricted to the posterior trunk, later in development it is further restricted to the spinal cord.

== Targets of miR-10 ==
A number of Hox genes have been shown to be regulated by miR-10. These genes encode transcription factors which are important in embryonic development. In zebrafish embryos, miR-10 binds to sites in the three prime untranslated region (3'UTR) of the HoxB1a and HoxB3a genes, which are important in anterior-posterior patterning during embryonic development. Binding of miR-10 leads to the repression of these genes. It also acts synergistically with HoxB4 to repress these genes. The mir-10 gene is located near to the HoxB1a and HoxB3a genes within the zebrafish genome, Hox-1 and Hox-3 paralogues located on different Hox clusters are not targets of miR-10. Human HOXD10 gene has also been shown experimentally to be repressed by miR-10a and miR-10b.

It has also been experimentally verified that miR-10a downregulates the human HOXA1 and HOXA3 genes. Control of the Hox genes by miR-10 suggests that this microRNA may play an important role in development.

In addition to the Hox genes, miR-10a represses the transcription factor USF2 and the Ran and Pbp1 genes. The cell-surface proteoglycan Syndecan-1 is a target of miR-10b.

miR-10a binds to the five prime untranslated region (5'UTR) of mRNAs encoding ribosomal proteins, and increases their translation. It binds immediately downstream of the 5' oligopyrimidine tract (5'TOP) motif, a region important in the regulation of ribosomal protein synthesis.

== Association with cancer ==
Recently there has been much interest in abnormal levels of expression of microRNAs in cancers. Upregulation of miR-10 has been found in a number of cancers. Increased levels of miR-10a have been found in glioblastoma, anaplastic astrocytomas, primary hepatocellular carcinomas and colon cancer. Increased levels of miR-10b have been found in glioblastoma, anaplastic astrocytomas, pancreatic cancer, and metastatic breast cancer. Although high expression of miR-10b is found in metastatic breast cancers, it does not appear to be present at high levels in early breast cancers. The expression of miR-10b is correlated with overall survival in 1262 breast cancer patients.

Downregulation of miR-10a has been found in chronic myeloid leukemia. USF2, a target gene of miR-10a, has been found to be overexpressed in these leukemias. Downregulation of miR-10a has also been found in acute myeloid leukemia, the most common acute leukemia affecting adults. Conversely, miR-10a and miR-10b have found to be upregulated in acute myeloid leukemia with NPM1 mutations; these account for approximately a third of adult acute myeloid leukemia cases and contain mutations in the NPM1 gene which result in the relocation of NPM1 from the nucleus to the cytoplasm. Upregulation of miR-10b has also been found in B-cell chronic lymphocytic leukemia, the most common type of leukemia.

Genomic copy number abnormalities involving microRNA genes (both increases and decreases in copy number) have been found in cancers. A gain in copy number of the mir-10a gene has been found in melanoma and breast cancer.

Upstream of the mir-10b gene is a promoter region containing a binding site for the Twist transcription factor (Twist). Binding of Twist to this promoter region induces miR-10b expression, leading to a reduced translation of the tumour suppressor HOXD10. This results in upregulation of RhoA/RhoC, Rho kinase activation and tumour cell invasion.

=== Studies in metastatic tumors ===
Boston, Massachusetts-based Transcode Therapeutics is developing drugs to target Mir-10b, which the company regards as "a master regulator of metastatic disease". Preclinical trials in a murine model of metastatic breast cancer found that one of their drugs candidates, MN-anti-miR10b (now known as TTX-MC138), combined with low-dose doxorubicin, resulted in a complete elimination of distant metastases in 65% of the rodents and a significant decrease in mortality. A first-in-human phase 0 study of TTX-MC138 began in 2023. The company believes the drug, and others with similar mechanisms, could dramatically increase survival rates for people with metastatic tumors.

== See also ==
- MicroRNA
- Gene expression
- Hox genes
