= David B. Beck =

American clinical geneticist

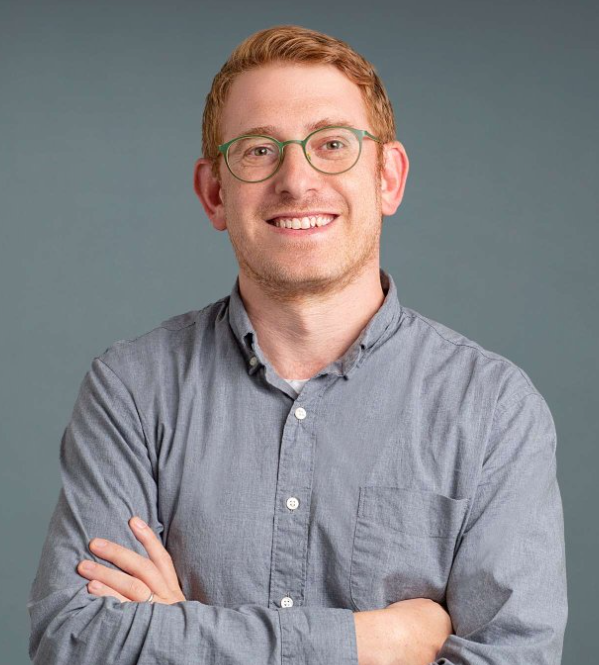
- Beck in 2021
- Born: David Benjamin Beck; New Haven, Connecticut, US
- Education: Brown University (BA); New York University Grossman School of Medicine (MD/PhD)
- Known for: VEXAS Syndrome; Autoinflammatory Disease; Rare Genetic Disease
- Scientific career
- Fields: Clinical Genetics
- Workplaces: Columbia University; National Institutes of Health; New York University Grossman School of Medicine
- Doctoral advisor: Danny Reinberg
- Website: davidbecklab.org

David B. Beck is an American physician-scientist, clinical geneticist, and researcher who co-discovered VEXAS Syndrome. He holds dual appointments as an assistant professor in the Department of Medicine and the Department of Biochemistry and Molecular Pharmacology, and is a member of the Center for Human Genetics and Genomics and the Division of Rheumatology at New York University Grossman School of Medicine and NYU Langone Health.

== Early life and education ==
David B. Beck was born in New Haven, Connecticut. He earned his Bachelor of Arts (BA) from Brown University. He would then go on to join the Medical Scientist Training Program (MSTP) at the New York University Grossman School of Medicine. Here he would earn both his PhD (2012) and M.D. (2014). He completed his doctoral thesis in the laboratory of HHMI Investigator Danny Reinberg. Beck continued clinical training through the clinician scientist pathway in Internal Medicine at Columbia University and later went on to perform a fellowship in Clinical Genetics jointly at the National Institutes of Health and Johns Hopkins University School of Medicine combined program.

== Career ==
Following completion of his fellowship, Beck performed postdoctoral research with Daniel L. Kastner at the National Institutes of Health and National Human Genome Research Institute. During his training Beck and colleagues identified a novel inflammatory disorder they called vacuoles, E1 enzyme, X-linked, autoinflammatory and somatic syndrome, or VEXAS syndrome. In 2021, Beck joined the New York University Grossman School of Medicine faculty where he runs the Inflammatory Diseases Genetic Clinic and his own laboratory where he and his team investigate VEXAS syndrome as well as genetic causes of other disease, with an emphasis on inflammatory diseases and their underlying mechanisms.
