= Rocker-bottom foot =

Congenital vertical talus
- Other names: Congenital vertical talus
- Specialty: Medical genetics Orthopedics podiatry

Unlike the flexible flat foot that is commonly encountered in young children, congenital vertical talus is characterized by presence of a very rigid foot deformity. The foot deformity in congenital vertical talus consists of various components, namely a prominent calcaneus caused by the ankle equines or plantar flexion, a convex and rounded sole of the foot caused by prominence of the head of the talus, and a dorsiflexion and abduction of the forefoot and midfoot on the hindfoot. It gets its name from the foot's resemblance to the bottom of a rocking chair. There are two subcategories of congenital vertical talus; namely idiopathic or isolated type, and non-idiopathic type, which may be seen in association with arthrogryposis multiplex congenital, genetic syndromes and other neuromuscular disorders.

It can be associated with Edwards' syndrome (trisomy 18), Patau syndrome (trisomy 13), Trisomy 9 and mutation in the gene HOXD10.

== Treatment ==
The treatment of congenital vertical talus can be broadly classified into conservative and surgical.

=== Serial casting ===
The mainstay of management of congenital vertical talus is serial manipulative casting also known as the reversed Ponseti technique. This technique involves gradual step-wise correction of the deformity usually on a weekly basis. In the event there is residual deformity or incomplete correction at the end of the serial castings, the orthopedic surgeon may resort to a minimally invasive surgery at the talo-navicular joint to achieve full correction. The results of the serial manipulative casting technique or reversed Ponseti technique are satisfactory especially if started shortly after birth.

=== Classic soft tissue release ===
The classic or extensive soft tissue release involves a peri-talar release of tight or contracted ligamentous and capsular structures with the intent of achieving a complete repositioning or reduction of the talo-navicular joint. In that regard, various surgical techniques have been described.[reference] The extensive soft tissue release may be indicated in cases where the conservative methods – serial manipulative casting technique – have failed to achieved full correction of the deformity. However, the results are guarded. All patients need close long term follow-up to allow for early detection of deformity recurrence. This is irrespective of the treatment modality used to attain deformity correction.

=== Naviculectomy or resection arthroplasty ===
Naviculectomy or simply navicular excision represents a form of mid-tarsal resection arthroplasty. It may be necessary to associate naviculectomy with limited soft tissue releases to address the remaining components of the deformity. Naviculectomy has been practiced on ambulatory and non-ambulatory (non-walkers) patients. Naviculectomy is usually reserved for children with resistant or complicated forms of congenital vertical talus such as neglected, previously operated and recurrent cases. Naviculectomy may be indicated in the above resistant case of congenital vertical talus on the condition that a plantigrade foot is considered unlikely by the conservative serial casting methods. And on the condition that extensive soft tissue release is not expected to yield a satisfactory clinical and functional result. Generally, naviculectomy is a more tissue-friendly procedure in contrast to the more aggressive classic and extensive peri-talar soft tissue releases. The clinical and radiologic results of naviculectomy are satisfactory on the short term, and long term follow-up.
