= HOXD10 =

Protein-coding gene in humans

Identifiers
- Aliases: HOXD10, HOX4, HOX4D, HOX4E, Hox-4.4, homeobox D10
- External IDs: OMIM: 142984; MGI: 96202; GeneCards: HOXD10

Gene location (Human)
Chr.	Chromosome 2 (human)
Band	2q31.1	Start	176,108,790 bp
Band	2q31.1	End	176,119,937 bp

Gene location (Mouse)
Chr.	Chromosome 2 (mouse)
Band	2 C3|2 44.13 cM	Start	74,522,268 bp
Band	2 C3|2 44.13 cM	End	74,525,449 bp
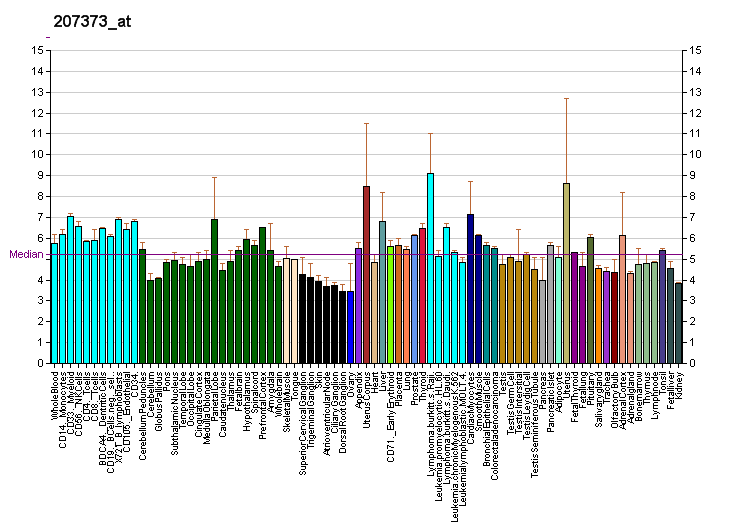
RNA expression pattern
Bgee	Human / Mouse (ortholog); Top expressed in: renal medulla; decidua; body of uterus; urethra; stromal cell of endometrium; Achilles tendon; vagina; myometrium; buccal mucosa cell; muscle layer of sigmoid colon / Top expressed in: uterus; tail of embryo; metanephros; neural tube; right kidney; male urethra; free upper limb; female urethra; genital tubercle; stroma of kidney; More reference expression data
BioGPS	More reference expression data
Gene ontology
Molecular function	sequence-specific DNA binding; DNA binding; DNA-binding transcription factor activity; chromatin binding; RNA polymerase II transcription regulatory region sequence-specific DNA binding; DNA-binding transcription activator activity, RNA polymerase II-specific; DNA-binding transcription factor activity, RNA polymerase II-specific
Cellular component	nucleus; nucleoplasm; cytosol; cytoplasmic ribonucleoprotein granule
Biological process	embryonic skeletal system morphogenesis; forelimb morphogenesis; peripheral nervous system neuron development; skeletal system development; proximal/distal pattern formation; regulation of transcription, DNA-templated; spinal cord motor neuron cell fate specification; adult locomotory behavior; hindlimb morphogenesis; transcription, DNA-templated; single fertilization; multicellular organism development; neuromuscular process; embryonic limb morphogenesis; regulation of gene expression; skeletal muscle tissue development; anterior/posterior pattern specification; positive regulation of transcription by RNA polymerase II; transcription by RNA polymerase II
Sources:Amigo / QuickGO
Orthologs
Databases	NCBI: entry; OMA: entry
Species	Human	Mouse
Entrez	3236	15430
Ensembl	ENSG00000128710	ENSMUSG00000050368
UniProt	P28358	P28359
RefSeq (mRNA)	NM_002148	NM_013554
RefSeq (protein)	NP_002139	NP_038582
Location (UCSC)	Chr 2: 176.11 – 176.12 Mb	Chr 2: 74.52 – 74.53 Mb
PubMed search
- Wikidata
View/Edit Human	View/Edit Mouse

Homeobox D10, also known as HOXD10, is a protein which in humans is encoded by the HOXD10 gene.

== Function ==
This gene is a member of the Abd-B homeobox family and encodes a protein with a homeobox DNA-binding domain. It is included in a cluster of homeobox D genes located on chromosome 2. The encoded nuclear protein functions as a sequence-specific transcription factor that is expressed in the developing limb buds and is involved in differentiation and limb development.

== Clinical significance ==
Mutations in this gene have been associated with Wilms' tumor and congenital vertical talus (also known as "rocker-bottom foot" deformity or congenital convex pes valgus) and/or a foot deformity resembling that seen in Charcot-Marie-Tooth disease.

== Regulation ==
The HOXD10 gene is repressed by the microRNAs miR-10a and miR-10b.

== See also ==
- Homeobox
