= Daniel L. Kastner =

American physician and researcher

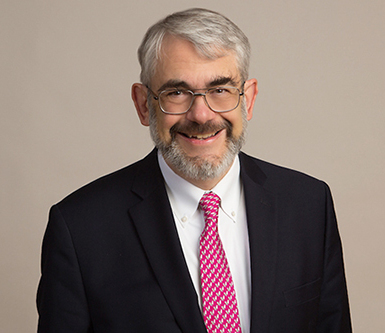
- Born: July 8, 1951; Lockport
- Died: July 28, 2026 (aged 75); Bethesda
- Education: Princeton University, Baylor College of Medicine
- Awards: George M. Kober Medal (2024)
- Website: www.genome.gov/staff/Dan-Kastner-MD-PhD

Daniel L. Kastner (1951 – July 28, 2026) was an American physician and researcher specialising in the genetics of autoinflammatory disorders. He was a Distinguished Investigator at the National Institutes of Health and was the scientific director of the National Human Genome Research Institute between 2010 and 2021. He was awarded the 2021 Crafoord Prize for Polyarthritis for his pioneering work on autoinflammatory diseases.

== Early life and education ==
Kastner was born in Lockport, New York, in 1951.

Kastner earned a BA in philosophy from Princeton University in 1973. and an MD and PhD from Baylor College of Medicine.

== Career ==
Kastner joined the National Institutes of Health in 1985 and as of 2020 is scientific director of the Division of Intramural Research of the National Human Genome Research Institute. His research there "has focused on using genetic and genomic strategies to understand inherited disorders of inflammation".

His work has led to the recognition and treatment of a range of autoinflammatory disorders. In 1987 his was one of two teams which simultaneously discovered and published the genetic mutation which causes FMF, and since then he has worked on disorders including TRAPS and DADA2. In 2020 he was one of the authors of the paper which first described the VEXAS syndrome. As of 2021 he is working on Behçet's disease.

As of 2021 Kastner has said that he plans to leave his post of scientific director at NHGRI "in the next few months". He will continue to work with the 3,000 patients in his clinic, and "find yet more disease genes, understand how they work, and develop new treatments."

The chair of the Crafoord Prize committee, Olle Kämpe, said in 2021:

Dan Kastner is often called the father of autoinflammatory diseases, a title that he thoroughly deserves. His discoveries have taught us a great deal about the immune system and its functions, contributing to effective treatments that reduce the symptoms of diseases from which patients previously suffered enormously, sometimes leading to premature death

Kastner died in Bethesda, Maryland on July 28, 2026.

== Honors and recognition ==
Kastner was elected to the National Academy of Sciences in 2010 and to the National Academy of Medicine in 2012.

In 2018 Kastner was named "Federal Employee of the Year" in the Samuel J. Heyman Service to America Medals ("the Sammies"). and in 2019 he won the Ross Prize for Molecular Medicine.

He was awarded the 2021 Crafoord Prize in Polyarthritis, with the citation "for establishing the concept of autoinflammatory diseases".
