= Himeic acid A =

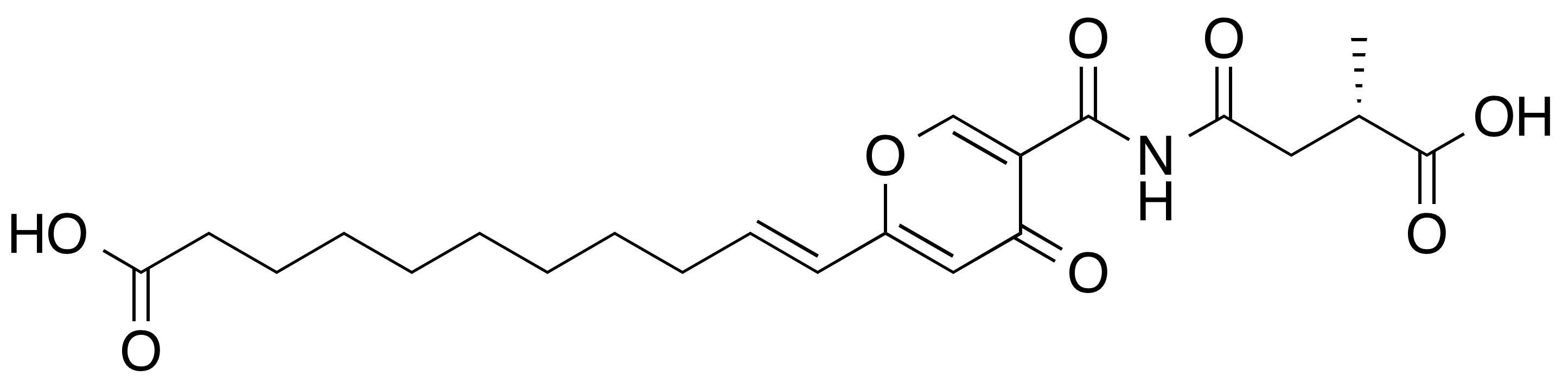

Names
- IUPAC name (E)-11-[5-[(3S)-3-carboxybutanoyl]carbamoyl]-4-oxopyran-2-yl]undec-10-enoic acid

Identifiers
CAS Number	838847-67-9
3D model (JSmol)	Interactive image
ChEBI	CHEBI:214481
ChEMBL	ChEMBL2046773
ChemSpider	9949586
PubChem CID	11774903
- InChI: InChI=1S/C22H29NO8/c1-15(22(29)30)12-19(25)23-21(28)17-14-31-16(13-18(17)24)10-8-6-4-2-3-5-7-9-11-20(26)27/h8,10,13-15H,2-7,9,11-12H2,1H3,(H,26,27)(H,29,30)(H,23,25,28)/b10-8+/t15-/m0/s1 Key: OKGLROPOZIVCCZ-HQPKTYMTSA-N
- SMILES: C[C@@H](CC(=O)NC(=O)C1=COC(=CC1=O)/C=C/CCCCCCCCC(=O)O)C(=O)O

Properties
Chemical formula	C_{22}H_{29}NO_{8}
Molar mass	435.473 g·mol^{−1}
- Except where otherwise noted, data are given for materials in their standard state (at 25 °C [77 °F], 100 kPa). Infobox references

Himeic acid A is a substance with chemical formula C_{22}H_{29}NO_{8}.
