= PYR-41 =

Names
- Preferred IUPAC name Ethyl 4-{(4Z)-4-[(5-nitrofuran-2-yl)methylidene]-3,5-dioxopyrazolidin-1-yl}benzoate

Identifiers
CAS Number	418805-02-4
3D model (JSmol)	Interactive image
ChemSpider	4492747
ECHA InfoCard	100.213.089
PubChem CID	5335621
UNII	HT54RAN9JZ
CompTox Dashboard (EPA)	DTXSID30416554
- InChI: InChI=1S/C17H13N3O7/c1-2-26-17(23)10-3-5-11(6-4-10)19-16(22)13(15(21)18-19)9-12-7-8-14(27-12)20(24)25/h3-9H,2H2,1H3,(H,18,21)/b13-9- Key: ARGIPZKQJGFSGQ-LCYFTJDESA-N
- SMILES: CCOC(=O)C1=CC=C(C=C1)N2C(=O)/C(=C\C3=CC=C(O3)[N+](=O)[O-])/C(=O)N2

Properties
Chemical formula	C_{17}H_{13}N_{3}O_{7}
Molar mass	371.3 g/mol
Density	1.5±0.1 g/cm3
- Except where otherwise noted, data are given for materials in their standard state (at 25 °C [77 °F], 100 kPa). Infobox references

PYR-41 is a cell permeable irreversible inhibitor of ubiquitin-activating enzyme E1. It was also reported to increase sumoylation in cells.

PYR-41 also blocks the downstream ubiquitination and ubiquitination-dependent protein degradation or other ubiquitination-mediated cellular activities. In addition, PYR-41 inhibits degradation of p53, a tumour suppressor.
