= Hyrtioreticulin =

Series of chemical substances

Names
- IUPAC name: A: (1R,3S)-6-hydroxy-1-(1H-imidazol-5-ylmethyl)-2,3,4,9-tetrahydro-1H-pyrido[3,4-b]indole-3-carboxylic acid; B: (1S,3S)-6-hydroxy-1-(1H-imidazol-5-ylmethyl)-2,3,4,9-tetrahydro-1H-pyrido[3,4-b]indole-3-carboxylic acid; C: (9R,11S)-7-hydroxy-9-methyl-3,10-diazatricyclo[6.4.1.0^{4,13}]trideca-1,4(13),5,7-tetraene-11-carboxylic acid; D: (9S,11S)-7-hydroxy-9-methyl-3,10-diazatricyclo[6.4.1.0^{4,13}]trideca-1,4(13),5,7-tetraene-11-carboxylic acid; E: (1R,3S)-6-hydroxy-1-methyl-2,3,4,9-tetrahydro-1H-pyrido[3,4-b]indole-3-carboxylic acid; F: (1S,3S)-5-[(1R)-1-(carboxymethylamino)ethyl]-6-hydroxy-1-methyl-2,3,4,9-tetrahydro-1H-pyrido[3,4-b]indole-3-carboxylic acid

Identifiers
CAS Number	E: 42438-96-0
3D model (JSmol)	A: Interactive image; B: Interactive image; C: Interactive image; D: Interactive image; E: Interactive image; F: Interactive image
ChEMBL	A: ChEMBL2046768; B: ChEMBL2046769; C: ChEMBL2046770; D: ChEMBL2046771; E: ChEMBL2046772
ChemSpider	A: 28507649; B: 28505724; C: 28505725; D: 28530737; E: 28530738
PubChem CID	A: 70694527; B: 70684035; C: 70686170; D: 70686171; E: 70686172; F: 72197062
- InChI: A: InChI=1S/C16H16N4O3/c21-9-1-2-12-10(4-9)11-5-14(16(22)23)19-13(15(11)20-12)3-8-6-17-7-18-8/h1-2,4,6-7,13-14,19-21H,3,5H2,(H,17,18)(H,22,23)/t13-,14+/m1/s1 Key: VXURZHPEJYLPGK-KGLIPLIRSA-N; B: InChI=1S/C16H16N4O3/c21-9-1-2-12-10(4-9)11-5-14(16(22)23)19-13(15(11)20-12)3-8-6-17-7-18-8/h1-2,4,6-7,13-14,19-21H,3,5H2,(H,17,18)(H,22,23)/t13-,14-/m0/s1 Key: VXURZHPEJYLPGK-KBPBESRZSA-N; C: InChI=1S/C13H14N2O3/c1-6-11-10(16)3-2-8-12(11)7(5-14-8)4-9(15-6)13(17)18/h2-3,5-6,9,14-16H,4H2,1H3,(H,17,18)/t6-,9+/m1/s1 Key: OGKMUYSVGRXIOH-MUWHJKNJSA-N; D: InChI=1S/C13H14N2O3/c1-6-11-10(16)3-2-8-12(11)7(5-14-8)4-9(15-6)13(17)18/h2-3,5-6,9,14-16H,4H2,1H3,(H,17,18)/t6-,9-/m0/s1 Key: OGKMUYSVGRXIOH-RCOVLWMOSA-N; E: InChI=1S/C13H14N2O3/c1-6-12-9(5-11(14-6)13(17)18)8-4-7(16)2-3-10(8)15-12/h2-4,6,11,14-16H,5H2,1H3,(H,17,18)/t6-,11+/m1/s1 Key: WYQWRMWMBQUYSD-KBUNVGBDSA-N; F: InChI=1S/C17H21N3O5/c1-7(18-6-13(22)23)14-12(21)4-3-10-15(14)9-5-11(17(24)25)19-8(2)16(9)20-10/h3-4,7-8,11,18-21H,5-6H2,1-2H3,(H,22,23)(H,24,25)/t7-,8+,11+/m1/s1 Key: IIUWIOFAHFMFDU-FYBVGQRMSA-N
- SMILES: A: C1[C@H](N[C@@H](C2=C1C3=C(N2)C=CC(=C3)O)CC4=CN=CN4)C(=O)O; B: C1[C@H](N[C@H](C2=C1C3=C(N2)C=CC(=C3)O)CC4=CN=CN4)C(=O)O; C: C[C@@H]1C2=C(C=CC3=C2C(=CN3)C[C@H](N1)C(=O)O)O; D: C[C@H]1C2=C(C=CC3=C2C(=CN3)C[C@H](N1)C(=O)O)O; E: C[C@@H]1C2=C(C[C@H](N1)C(=O)O)C3=C(N2)C=CC(=C3)O; F: C[C@H]1C2=C(C[C@H](N1)C(=O)O)C3=C(N2)C=CC(=C3[C@@H](C)NCC(=O)O)O
- Except where otherwise noted, data are given for materials in their standard state (at 25 °C [77 °F], 100 kPa). Infobox references

The hyrtioreticulins are a series of indole alkaloids, named hyrtioreticulin A through hyrtioreticulin F, that were isolated from Hyrtios reticulatus, an ocean sponge.

== Chemical structures ==
hyrtioreticulin A	hyrtioreticulin B	hyrtioreticulin C
hyrtioreticulin D	hyrtioreticulin E	hyrtioreticulin F
