= Adenosine deaminase 2 deficiency =

Deficiency of Adenosine Deaminase 2
- Other names: DADA2
- Autosomal recessive pattern is the inheritance manner of this condition
- Specialty: Medical genetics, Pediatrics, Rheumatology, Neurology, Dermatology, Immunology, Hematology
- Usual onset: Variable, but commonly in early childhood
- Duration: Lifelong
- Causes: Mutations in the ADA2 gene
- Diagnostic method: Genetic or Enzymatic Testing

Deficiency of Adenosine deaminase 2 (DADA2) is a monogenic disease associated with systemic inflammation and vasculopathy that affects a wide variety of organs in different patients. As a result, it is hard to characterize a patient with this disorder. Manifestations of the disease include but are not limited to recurrent fever, livedoid rash (reticularis or racemosa), various cytopenias, stroke, immunodeficiency, and bone marrow failure. Symptoms often onset during early childhood, but some cases have been discovered as late as 65 years old.

DADA2 is caused by mutations in the ADA2 gene, and is inherited in an autosomal recessive manner. The protein product of this gene, adenosine deaminase 2 (ADA2), is an extracellular enzyme that breaks down adenosine and may also serve as a growth factor. Pathogenic mutations decrease this enzymatic activity in patient blood, leading to disease manifestations. However, mutational status and residual enzyme activity levels do not explicitly correlate with the type of disease a patient displays.

The most common treatment for DADA2 is TNF inhibitors. This therapy tends to prevent vasculitis-related manifestations such as rash and stroke, but does not perform well in individuals presenting with severe hematologic and immunologic abnormalities such as bone marrow failure or severe recurrent infections. In these cases, hematopoietic stem cell transplantation has led to major improvements in the vascular, hematologic, and immunologic manifestations of disease.

== Signs and symptoms ==
The signs and symptoms of disease are wide-ranging in severity, but can be grouped into vascular, immunologic, and hematologic manifestations. Individual patients typically present with disease of only one of these subtypes, but this is not always the case. Symptoms have also been known to abate and recur even without treatment. Twenty-four percent of patients have disease onset before 1 year of age, and 77% of patients have disease onset before 10 years of age.

Vasculopathy is the hallmark of DADA2, and was the most prominent feature of the disease upon its initial discovery. The vasculitis seen in DADA2 is similar to polyarteritis nodosa (PAN), often leading to misdiagnosis. However, DADA2 patients typically have earlier disease onset, and a greater prevalence of skin and neurologic manifestations. The systemic inflammation present in DADA2 leads to this vasculopathy, with symptoms involving but not limited to skin, brain, gastrointestinal tract, and kidneys. Livedo racemosa and livedo reticularis are the most common manifestations in skin, although other symptoms such as digital necrosis, subcutaneous nodules, and non-specific rash have been seen. The most common neurological manifestations of DADA2 are secondary to vasculitis. Fifty-one percent of patients present with neurologic disease, typically in the form of lacunar stroke. In some patients, stroke can be the first indication of disease.

Approximately 50% of patients have some form of immunologic or hematologic disease. While patients with vascular-predominant disease typically have only mild deficiencies in these areas, most DADA2 patients display deficiencies in IgG and IgM antibody production as well as overall poor B cell function. Bone marrow failure, pure red cell aplasia (PRCA), or immunodeficiency are the most serious manifestations in those who don't display the classic vascular disease. Those with the bone marrow failure phenotype commonly have hepatosplenomegaly, recurrent infection, and various cytopenias. Meanwhile, those with PRCA can display a similar disease to Diamond-Blackfan anemia. The onset of PRCA caused by DADA2 is commonly before one year of age, while children with bone marrow failure typically onset around two years of age. In patients with severe immunodeficiencies, upper and lower respiratory infections are most common. However, intestinal and urinary tract infections have been seen alongside various more rare infections such as viral encephalitis.

There are a variety of rare DADA2 symptoms that have only been reported in a handful of patients. For example, lymphoproliferation and large granular lymphocytic leukemia have been reported. Other symptoms are becoming more known over time – reports of hypertension associated with DADA2 have increased in recent years.

== Genetics ==
DADA2 is caused by mutations in DNA encoding the gene ADA2, formerly known as CECR1. The ADA2 gene is located on chromosome 22q11.1. Many different kinds of mutations have been reported, including missense, nonsense, splice-site, frameshift, deletions, and duplications. As of 2021, there are 117 known mutations, although classification into disease-causing and benign is ongoing.

While there is some relationship between the genetic mutations a patient displays and their experience with the disease, the relationship is not one to one. Patients with DADA2 that share the same mutation are more likely to experience similar disease, but even family members with the same mutations have had entirely different disease courses. While the reasons for this difference are not well defined in DADA2 this is common in other so-called monogenic diseases, where environment and modifier genetics have been shown to play a role. However, multiple groups have found some correlation between mutation and phenotype. There is some indication that mutations present in the dimerization domain of ADA2 predispose towards vasculitis-associated disease, whereas mutations in the catalytic domain lead to the Diamond Blackfan anemia-like phenotype. In another study, specific mutations segregated perfectly into groups based on the type of the disease the patient displayed. In this analysis, the common G47R mutation always found in individuals with vasculitic disease, and the G358R mutation always seen in those with severe hematologic disease. However, some mutations did not separate as well. For example, the R169Q mutation was found in both vasculitic- and hematologic-forward disease subtypes. An analysis of the enzymatic activity of mutated ADA2 enzyme in vitro found that mutations yielding greater enzyme activity favored vasculitis, whereas mutations with less residual activity favored hematologic manifestations.

== Pathophysiology ==
The mechanism by which mutations in ADA2 lead to disease manifestations is not fully clear. ADA2 is a primarily extracellular protein highly expressed by myeloid immune cells such as monocytes, macrophages, and dendritic cells. ADA2 has been hypothesized to have multiple functions, including as an enzyme, a growth factor, and an intracellular DNA sensor.

ADA2 catalyzes the reaction of adenosine to inosine and 2'deoxyadenosine in the blood. All DADA2 patients display less than 5% of the normal activity of ADA2 in blood samples, implicating the potential importance of this enzymatic role. Adenosine levels are higher in patients than healthy individuals. Adenosine binds to cell surface receptors on neutrophils, causing the formation of neutrophil extracellular traps (NETs). NETs have been identified at increased levels in both affected tissue and in circulation of DADA2 patients.

Endothelial cell activation and damage is a further source of inflammation and vascular symptoms caused by DADA2. Endothelial cells from patients are extensively damaged and secrete pro-inflammatory cytokines. However, endothelial cells themselves don't express the ADA2 protein, so this phenotype is likely mediated by the effects of mutant ADA2 on other cell types feeding back onto endothelial cells. For example, ADA2 mutant monocytes display abnormal differentiation into macrophages, and endothelial cells grown in the presence of ADA2 deficient monocytes are similarly extensively damaged.

The molecular underpinnings of the immunologic disease are unclear, but the upregulation of type I interferon-stimulated genes, poor B cell differentiation, reduced antibody production, and lymphoproliferation have been noted. The cause of severe hematologic manifestations such as pure red cell aplasia and bone marrow failure are also unknown. However, the ADA2 protein is similar in structure to the adenosine deaminase growth factors found in other species. Deficiencies of these proteins in frogs and fruit flies have been shown to cause developmental abnormalities, such as small size and early death respectively. In humans, extracellular ADA2 interacts with many immune cell types, including neutrophils, monocytes, NK cells, and specific B and T cell subtypes.

== Diagnosis ==
Currently, screening for DADA2 is initiated upon a physician's judgement. Criteria to trigger screening have been proposed however, including at least one sign of inflammation and vasculitis. The specific diagnosis of DADA2 requires either confirmation of known pathogenic mutations in ADA2 or low ADA2 enzymatic activity in patient blood. Genetic testing for DADA2 has been performed as either a single-gene test through Sanger sequencing, or a multi-gene test through panel testing, whole exome sequencing, or whole genome sequencing. These techniques vary in cost, intensity, and detection, and mutations have been missed due to the technique initially used. As such, more extensive analysis is sometimes necessary if suspicion of DADA2 remains. Enzymatic activity analysis can confirm whether or not the ADA2 gene should be investigated further in these situations, and has been recommended by some as the premier diagnostic technique.

== Management ==
The most common management of DADA2 after diagnosis is TNFa inhibition (TNFi). This treatment serves those with vasculitic forms of the disease best, improving most symptoms and significantly preventing strokes. TNFi is ineffective in those with severe bone marrow dysfunction or immunodeficiency. In these patients, hematopoietic stem cell transplant is considered and upon successful completion can be curative.

Ongoing pre-clinical studies are researching gene therapy. Both gene therapy and enzyme replacement therapy have been successful in the adenosine deaminase deficiency, indicating their potential future success in DADA2.

== Epidemiology ==
As of 2020, over 260 cases of DADA2 have been identified since the disease's discovery in 2014. Since this disease is inherited in an autosomal recessive manner, men and women are equally likely to be diagnosed with DADA2. Based on computational analyses, the prevalence of DADA2 could be as high as 4 in 100,000. Generally, populations with high degrees of consanguinity or with founder variants have a higher prevalence of DADA2. For example, the Georgian-Jewish and Turkish populations are estimated to have a 1:10 and 1:500 likelihood of carrying the G47R mutation respectively. The R169Q variant is also more common in northern Europe, with a carrier frequency of 1:500.

== History ==
DADA2 was discovered in 2014 by two independent groups at the NIH and in Jerusalem, each reporting systemic inflammation and vasculitis syndromes caused by mutations in ADA2. The DADA2 Foundation was formed in 2016 to serve patients with DADA2 by providing information and spurring research progress. The Foundation has organized an international DADA2 Conference, being held in 2016, 2018, 2020 and 2023.
