= UBA6 =

Protein found in humans

Identifiers
- Aliases: UBA6, E1-L2, MOP-4, UBE1L2, ubiquitin like modifier activating enzyme 6
- External IDs: OMIM: 611361; MGI: 1913894; GeneCards: UBA6
Enzyme activity
EC #	BRENDA	ExPASy	KEGG	MetaCyc
6.2.1.45	↗	↗	↗	↗

Gene location (Human)
Chr.	Chromosome 4 (human)
Band	4q13.2	Start	67,612,652 bp
Band	4q13.2	End	67,701,155 bp

Gene location (Mouse)
Chr.	Chromosome 5 (mouse)
Band	5|5 E1	Start	86,257,146 bp
Band	5|5 E1	End	86,320,662 bp
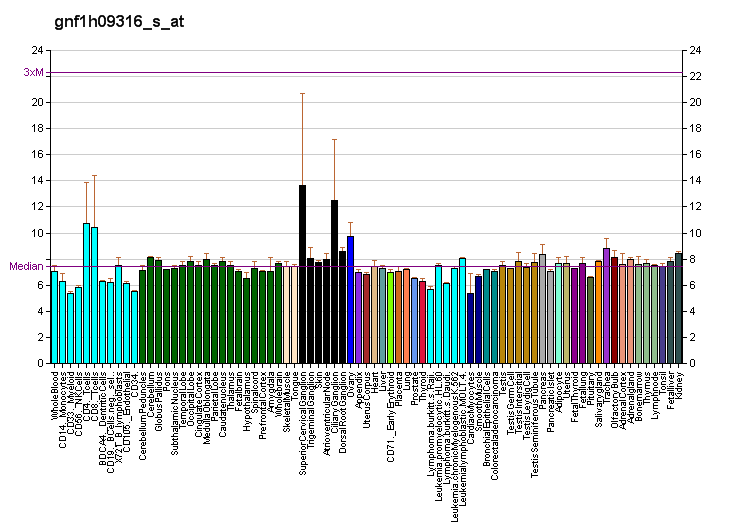

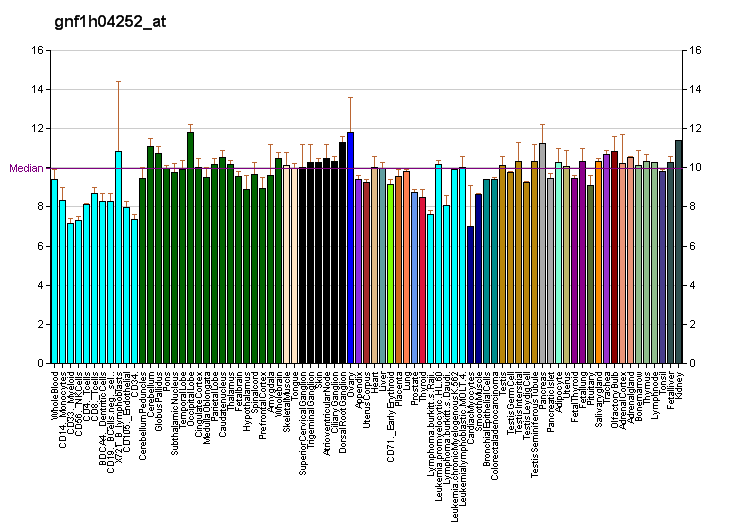

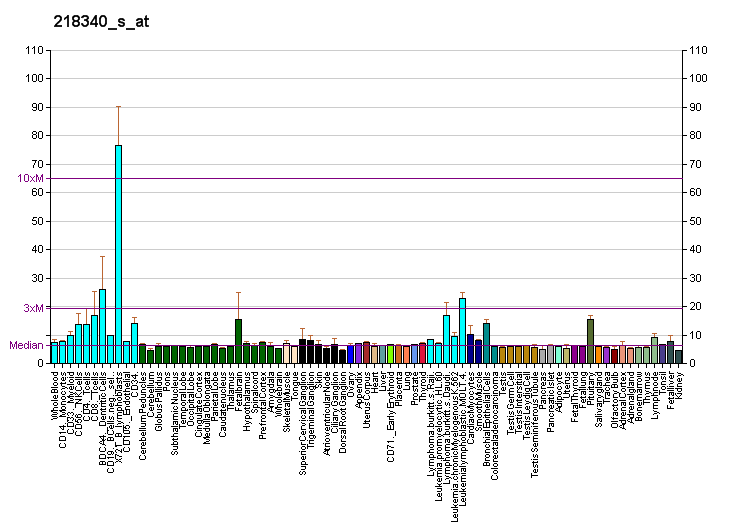
RNA expression pattern
Bgee	Human / Mouse (ortholog); Top expressed in: oocyte; epithelium of nasopharynx; Achilles tendon; gingival epithelium; germinal epithelium; mucosa of paranasal sinus; endothelial cell; ventricular zone; corpus callosum; oral cavity / Top expressed in: otic vesicle; hand; spermatogonium; trigeminal ganglion; primitive streak; superior cervical ganglion; otolith organ; maxillary prominence; utricle; pineal gland; More reference expression data
BioGPS	More reference expression data
Gene ontology
Molecular function	FAT10 activating enzyme activity; nucleotide binding; ligase activity; protein binding; ATP binding; ubiquitin-like modifier activating enzyme activity; ubiquitin activating enzyme activity
Cellular component	cytosol; cytoplasm
Biological process	dendritic spine development; amygdala development; learning; hippocampus development; ubiquitin-dependent protein catabolic process; locomotory behavior; protein ubiquitination; cellular response to DNA damage stimulus; protein modification by small protein conjugation
Sources:Amigo / QuickGO
Orthologs
Databases	NCBI: entry; OMA: entry
Species	Human	Mouse
Entrez	55236	231380
Ensembl	ENSG00000033178	ENSMUSG00000035898
UniProt	A0AVT1; H0Y9U5	Q8C7R4
RefSeq (mRNA)	NM_018227	NM_172712
RefSeq (protein)	NP_060697	NP_766300
Location (UCSC)	Chr 4: 67.61 – 67.7 Mb	Chr 5: 86.26 – 86.32 Mb
PubMed search
- Wikidata
View/Edit Human	View/Edit Mouse

Ubiquitin-like modifier-activating enzyme 6 is an enzyme that in humans is encoded by the UBA6 gene (previously UBE1L2). This enzyme functions to activate ubiquitin through adenylation.
