= Poly (ADP-ribose) polymerase =

Family of proteins

NAD+ ADP-ribosyltransferase

Identifiers
- EC no.: 2.4.2.30
- CAS no.: 58319-92-9

Databases
- BRENDA: enzyme data
- ExPASy: NiceZyme view
- KEGG: enzyme entry
- MetaCyc: metabolic pathway
- Rhea: reactions
- PDB structures: RCSB PDB PDBe PDBsum
Search
- PMC: articles
- PubMed: articles
- NCBI: proteins

ADP ribose

Nicotinamide adenine dinucleotide

Poly (ADP-ribose) polymerase (PARP) is a family of proteins involved in a number of cellular processes such as DNA repair, genomic stability, and programmed cell death.

== Members of PARP family ==
The PARP family comprises 17 members (10 putative). They vary greatly in structure and function within the cell.

- PARP1, PARP2, VPARP (PARP4), Tankyrase-1 and -2 (PARP-5a or TNKS, and PARP-5b or TNKS2) have a confirmed PARP activity.
- Others include PARP3, PARP6, TIPARP (or "PARP7"), PARP8, PARP9, PARP10, PARP11, PARP12, PARP14, PARP15, and PARP16.

== Structure ==
PARP is composed of four domains of interest: a DNA-binding domain, a caspase-cleaved domain (see below), an auto-modification domain, and a catalytic domain. The DNA-binding domain is composed of two zinc finger motifs. In the presence of damaged DNA (base pair-excised), the DNA-binding domain will bind the DNA and induce a conformational shift. It has been shown that this binding occurs independent of the other domains. This is integral in a programmed cell death model based on caspase cleavage inhibition of PARP. The auto-modification domain is responsible for releasing the protein from the DNA after catalysis. Also, it plays an integral role in cleavage-induced inactivation.

== Functions ==
The main role of PARP (found in the cell nucleus) is to detect and initiate an immediate cellular response to metabolic, chemical, or radiation-induced single-strand DNA breaks (SSB) by signaling the enzymatic machinery involved in the SSB repair.

Once PARP detects a SSB, it binds to the DNA, undergoes a structural change, and begins the synthesis of a polymeric adenosine diphosphate ribose (poly (ADP-ribose) or PAR) chain, which acts as a signal for the other DNA-repairing enzymes. Target enzymes include DNA ligase III (LigIII), DNA polymerase beta (polβ), and scaffolding proteins such as X-ray cross-complementing gene 1 (XRCC1). After repairing, the PAR chains are degraded via Poly(ADP-ribose) glycohydrolase (PARG).

NAD+ is required as substrate for generating ADP-ribose monomers. It has been thought that overactivation of PARP may deplete the stores of cellular NAD+ and induce a progressive ATP depletion and necrotic cell death, since glucose oxidation is inhibited. But more recently it was suggested that it is PARP-catalysed inhibition of hexokinase activity that leads to defects in glycolysis (Andrabi, PNAS 2014). Basal PARP activity also regulates basal bioenergetics. Note below that PARP is inactivated by caspase-3 cleavage during programmed cell death.

PARP enzymes are essential in a number of cellular functions, including expression of inflammatory genes: PARP1 is required for the induction of ICAM-1 gene expression by cardiac myocytes and smooth muscle cells, in response to TNF.

== Activity ==
The catalytic domain is responsible for Poly (ADP-ribose) polymerization. This domain has a highly conserved motif that is common to all members of the PARP family. PAR polymer can reach lengths of up to 200 nucleotides before inducing apoptotic processes. The formation of PAR polymer is similar to the formation of DNA polymer from nucleoside triphosphates. Normal DNA synthesis requires that a pyrophosphate act as the leaving group, leaving a single phosphate group linking deoxyribose sugars. PAR is synthesized using nicotinamide (NAM) as the leaving group. This leaves a pyrophosphate as the linking group between ribose sugars rather than single phosphate groups. This creates some special bulk to a PAR bridge, which may have an additional role in cell signaling.

=== Role in repairing DNA nicks ===
One important function of PARP is assisting in the repair of single-strand DNA nicks. It binds sites with single-strand breaks through its N-terminal zinc fingers and will recruit XRCC1, DNA ligase III, DNA polymerase beta, and a kinase to the nick. This is called base excision repair (BER). PARP-2 has been shown to oligomerize with PARP-1 and, therefore, is also implicated in BER. The oligomerization has also been shown to stimulate PARP catalytic activity. PARP-1 is also known for its role in transcription through remodeling of chromatin by PARylating histones and relaxing chromatin structure, thus allowing transcription complex to access genes.

PARP-1 and PARP-2 are activated by DNA single-strand breaks, and both PARP-1 and PARP-2 knockout mice have severe deficiencies in DNA repair, and increased sensitivity to alkylating agents or ionizing radiation.

=== PARP activity and lifespan ===
PARP activity (which is mainly due to PARP1) measured in the permeabilized mononuclear leukocyte blood cells of thirteen mammalian species (rat, guinea pig, rabbit, marmoset, sheep, pig, cattle, pigmy chimpanzee, horse, donkey, gorilla, elephant and man) correlates with maximum lifespan of the species. The difference in activity between the longest-lived (humans) and shortest-lived (rat) species tested was 5-fold. Although the enzyme kinetics (unimolecular rate constant (kcat), Km and kcat/km) of the two enzymes were not significantly different, human PARP-1 was found to have a two-fold higher specific automodification capacity than the rat enzyme, which the authors posited could account, in part, for the higher PARP activity in humans than rats. Lymphoblastoid cell lines established from blood samples of humans who were centenarians (100 years old or older) have significantly higher PARP activity than cell lines from younger (20 to 70 years old) individuals, again indicating a linkage between longevity and repair capability.

These findings suggest that PARP-mediated DNA repair capability contributes to mammalian longevity. Thus, these findings support the DNA damage theory of aging, which assumes that un-repaired DNA damage is the underlying cause of aging, and that DNA repair capability contributes to longevity.

=== Role of tankyrases ===
The tankyrases (TNKs) are PARPs that comprise ankyrin repeats, an oligomerization domain (SAM), and a PARP catalytic domain (PCD). Tankyrases are also known as PARP-5a and PARP-5b. They were named for their interaction with the telomere-associated TERF1 proteins and ankyrin repeats. They may allow the removal of telomerase-inhibiting complexes from chromosome ends to allow for telomere maintenance. Through their SAM domain and ANKs, they can oligomerize and interact with many other proteins, such as TRF1, TAB182 (TNKS1BP1), GRB14, IRAP, NuMa, EBNA-1, and Mcl-1. They have multiple roles in the cell, like vesicular trafficking through its interaction in GLUT4 vesicles with insulin-responsive aminopeptidase (IRAP). It also plays a role in mitotic spindle assembly through its interaction with nuclear mitotic apparatus protein 1 (NuMa), therefore allowing the necessary bipolar orientation. In the absence of TNKs, mitosis arrest is observed in pre-anaphase through Mad2 spindle checkpoint. TNKs can also PARsylate Mcl-1L and Mcl-1S and inhibit both their pro- and anti-apoptotic function; relevance of this is not yet known.

=== Role in cell death ===
PARP can be activated in cells experiencing stress and/or DNA damage. Activated PARP can deplete the cell of ATP in an attempt to repair the damaged DNA. ATP depletion in a cell leads to lysis and cell death (necrosis). PARP also has the ability to induce programmed cell death, via the production of PAR, which stimulates mitochondria to release AIF. This mechanism appears to be caspase-independent. Cleavage of PARP, by enzymes such as caspases or cathepsins, typically inactivates PARP. The size of the cleavage fragments can give insight into which enzyme was responsible for the cleavage and can be useful in determining which cell death pathway has been activated.

=== Role in epigenetic DNA modification ===
CCCTC-binding factor (CTCF) induces PAR accumulation. ADP-ribose polymers, either free or PARP1 bound, are able to inhibit DNA methyltransferase activity at CpG sites. Thus, CTCF is involved in the cross-talk between poly(ADP-ribosyl)ation and DNA methylation, an important epigenetic regulatory factor.

=== Therapeutic inhibition ===
A substantial body of preclinical and clinical data has accumulated with PARP inhibitors in various forms of cancer. In this context, the role of PARP in single-strand DNA break repair is relevant, leading to replication-associated lesions that cannot be repaired if homologous recombination repair (HRR) is defective, and leading to the synthetic lethality of PARP inhibitors in HRR-defective cancer. HRR defects are classically associated with BRCA1 and 2 mutations associated with familial breast and ovarian cancer, but there may be many other causes of HRR defects. Thus, PARP inhibitors of various types (e.g. olaparib) for BRCA mutant breast and ovarian cancers can extend beyond these tumors if appropriate biomarkers can be developed to identify HRR defects. There are several additional classes of novel PARP inhibitors that are in various stages of clinical development.

Another substantial body of data relates to the role of PARP in selected non-oncologic indications. In a number of severe, acute diseases (such as stroke, neurotrauma, circulatory shock, and acute myocardial infarction), PARP inhibitors exert therapeutic benefit (e.g. reduction of infarct size or improvement of organ function). There are also observational data demonstrating PARP activation in human tissue samples. In these disease indications, PARP overactivation due to oxidative and nitrative stress drives cell necrosis and pro-inflammatory gene expression, which contributes to disease pathology. As the clinical trials with PARP inhibitors in various forms of cancer progress, it is hoped that a second line of clinical investigations, aimed at testing of PARP inhibitors for various non-oncologic indications, will be initiated, in a process called "therapeutic repurposing".

== Inactivation ==
PARP is inactivated by caspase cleavage. It is believed that normal inactivation occurs in systems where DNA damage is extensive. In these cases, more energy would be invested in repairing damage than is feasible, so that energy is instead retrieved for other cells in the tissue through programmed cell death. Besides degradation, there is recent evidence about reversible downregulation mechanisms for PARP, among these an "autoregulatory loop", which is driven by PARP1 itself and modulated by the YY1 transcription factor.

While in vitro cleavage by caspase occurs throughout the caspase family, preliminary data suggest that caspase-3 and caspase-7 are responsible for in vivo cleavage. Cleavage occurs at aspartic acid 214 and glycine 215, separating PARP into a 24 kDa and 89 kDa segment. The smaller moiety includes the zinc finger motif requisite in DNA binding. The 89 kDa fragment includes the auto-modification domain and catalytic domain. The putative mechanism of PCD activation via PARP inactivation relies on the separation of the DNA-binding region and the auto-modification domain. The DNA-binding region is capable of doing so independent of the rest of the protein, cleaved or not. It is unable, however, to dissociate without the auto-modification domain. In this way, the DNA-binding domain will attach to a damaged site and be unable to effect repair, as it no longer has the catalytic domain. The DNA-binding domain prevents other, non-cleaved PARP from accessing the damaged site and initiating repairs. This model suggests that this "sugar plug" can also begin the signal for apoptosis.

== Plant PARPs ==
Roles of poly(ADP-ribosyl)ation in plant responses to DNA damage, infection, and other stresses have been studied. Plant PARP1 is very similar to animal PARP1, but intriguingly, in Arabidopsis thaliana and presumably other plants, PARP2 plays more significant roles than PARP1 in protective responses to DNA damage and bacterial pathogenesis. The plant PARP2 carries PARP regulatory and catalytic domains with only intermediate similarity to PARP1, and it carries N-terminal SAP DNA binding motifs rather than the zinc finger DNA binding motifs of plant and animal PARP1 proteins.

== See also ==
- DNA damage theory of aging
- Maximum life span
- PARP1
- PARP inhibitor class of anti-cancer agents
- Parthanatos
- Senescence
