= Tankyrase =

Enzyme

TNKS
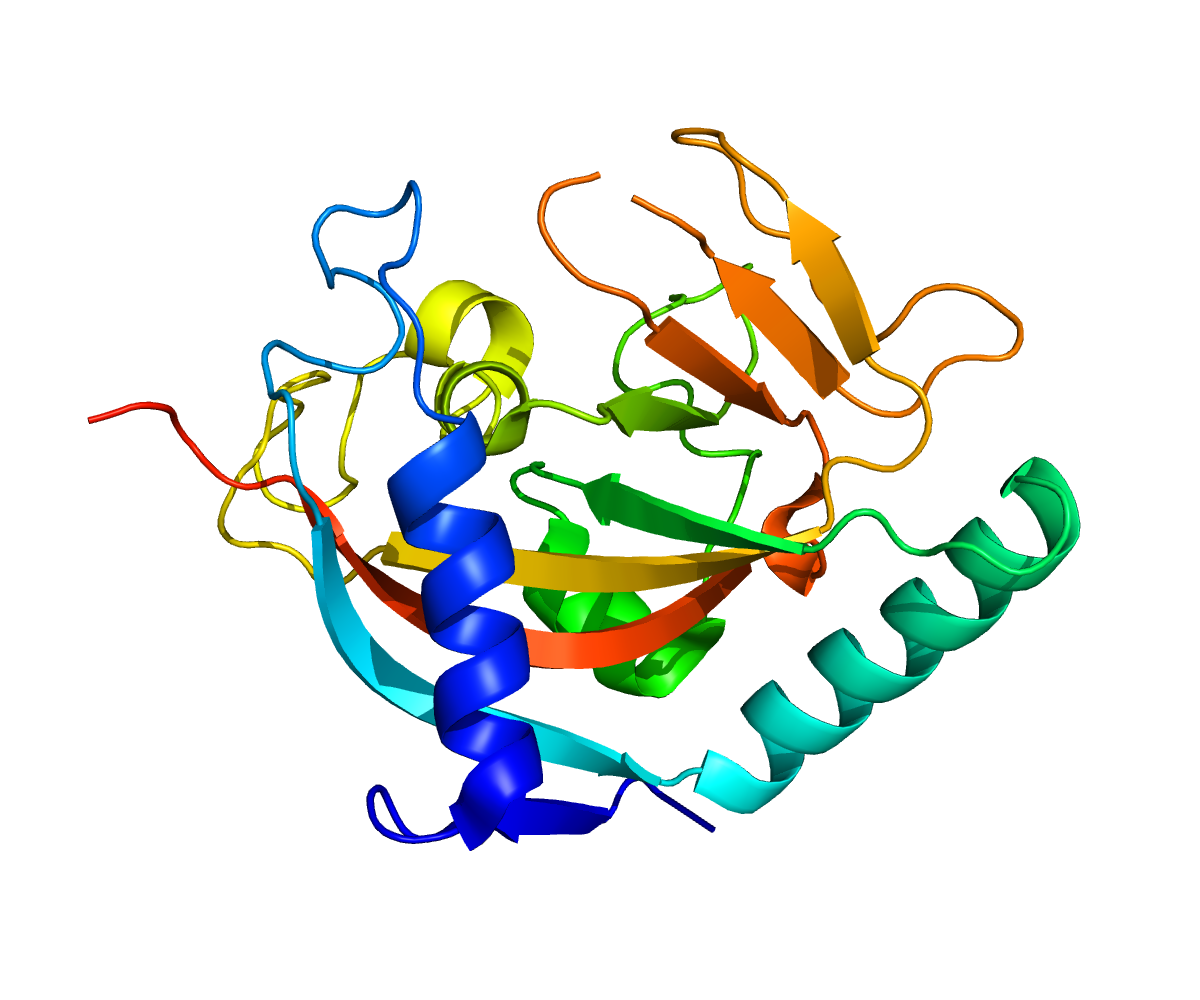

Identifiers
- Aliases: TNKS, ARTD5, PARP-5a, PARP5A, PARPL, TIN1, TINF1, TNKS1, pART5, tankyrase
- External IDs: OMIM: 603303; MGI: 1341087; GeneCards: TNKS
Available structures
PDB	Ortholog search: PDBe RCSB
PDB	List of PDB id codes 2RF5, 3UDD, 3UH2, 3UH4, 4DVI, 4I9I, 4K4E, 4K4F, 4KRS, 4LI6, 4LI7, 4LI8, 4MSG, 4MSK, 4MT9, 4N3R, 4N4V, 4OA7, 4TOR, 4TOS, 4U6A, 4UUH, 4UW1, 4W5S, 4W6E, 5ECE, 5EBT, 5ETY
Enzyme activity
EC #	BRENDA	ExPASy	KEGG	MetaCyc
2.4.2.30	↗	↗	↗	↗

Gene location (Human)
Chr.	Chromosome 8 (human)
Band	8p23.1	Start	9,555,912 bp
Band	8p23.1	End	9,782,346 bp

Gene location (Mouse)
Chr.	Chromosome 8 (mouse)
Band	8 A4|8 21.16 cM	Start	35,293,614 bp
Band	8 A4|8 21.16 cM	End	35,432,844 bp
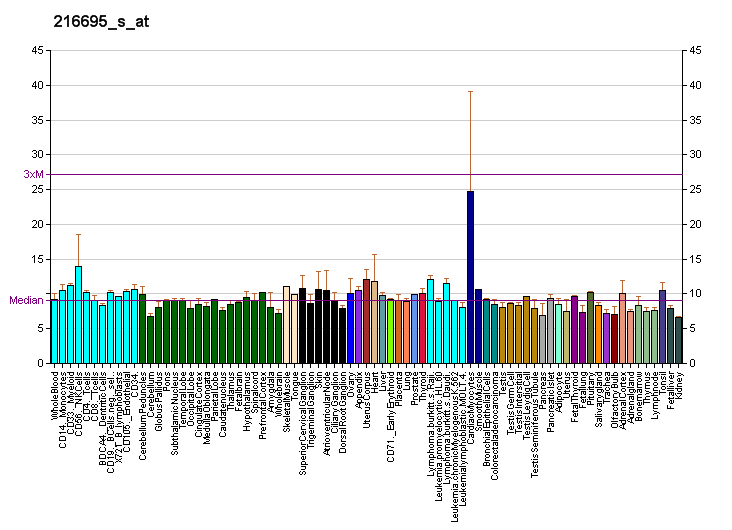

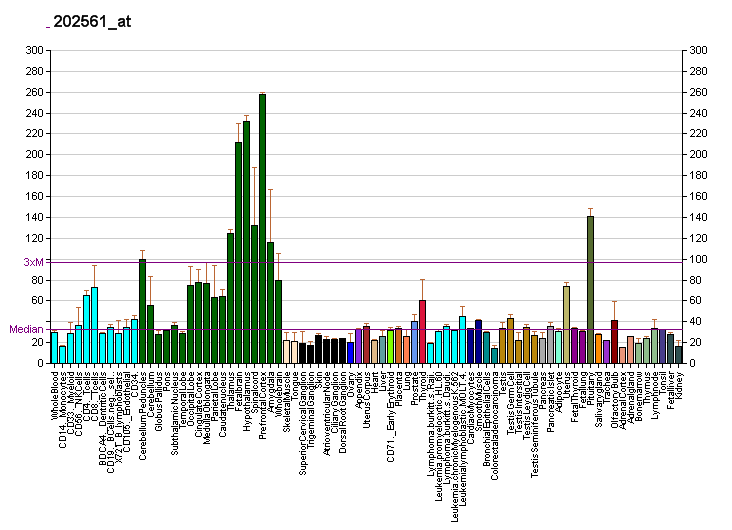
RNA expression pattern
Bgee	Human / Mouse (ortholog); Top expressed in: middle temporal gyrus; internal globus pallidus; Brodmann area 23; corpus callosum; pons; dorsal motor nucleus of vagus nerve; superior vestibular nucleus; inferior ganglion of vagus nerve; corpus epididymis; tibia / Top expressed in: hand; superior cervical ganglion; otolith organ; utricle; habenula; secondary oocyte; atrioventricular valve; pontine nuclei; ventral tegmental area; zygote; More reference expression data
BioGPS	More reference expression data
Gene ontology
Molecular function	transferase activity; glycosyltransferase activity; histone binding; zinc ion binding; metal ion binding; protein binding; NAD+ ADP-ribosyltransferase activity; protein ADP-ribosylase activity
Cellular component	cytoplasm; cytosol; Golgi apparatus; spindle pole; pericentriolar material; membrane; Golgi membrane; nuclear pore; chromosome; telomere; chromosome, centromeric region; cytoskeleton; nucleus; nucleoplasm; nuclear body; nuclear membrane; mitotic spindle pole; microtubule organizing center
Biological process	protein auto-ADP-ribosylation; mRNA transport; protein ADP-ribosylation; positive regulation of telomere capping; mitotic spindle organization; protein polyubiquitination; protein localization to chromosome, telomeric region; cell division; spindle assembly; peptidyl-serine phosphorylation; positive regulation of telomerase activity; negative regulation of telomere maintenance via telomere lengthening; negative regulation of maintenance of mitotic sister chromatid cohesion, telomeric; protein transport; cell cycle; peptidyl-threonine phosphorylation; regulation of telomere maintenance via telomerase; positive regulation of transcription by RNA polymerase II; protein poly-ADP-ribosylation; negative regulation of telomeric DNA binding; positive regulation of canonical Wnt signaling pathway; positive regulation of telomere maintenance via telomerase; Wnt signaling pathway; cellular response to nutrient
Sources:Amigo / QuickGO
Orthologs
Databases	NCBI: entry; OMA: entry
Species	Human	Mouse
Entrez	8658	21951
Ensembl	ENSG00000173273; ENSG00000285372	ENSMUSG00000031529
UniProt	O95271	Q6PFX9
RefSeq (mRNA)	NM_003747	NM_175091
RefSeq (protein)	NP_003738	NP_780300
Location (UCSC)	Chr 8: 9.56 – 9.78 Mb	Chr 8: 35.29 – 35.43 Mb
PubMed search
- Wikidata
View/Edit Human	View/Edit Mouse

Tankyrase, also known as tankyrase 1, is an enzyme that in humans is encoded by the TNKS gene. It inhibits the binding of TERF1 to telomeric DNA. Tankyrase attracts substantial interest in cancer research through its interaction with AXIN1 and AXIN2, which are negative regulators of pro-oncogenic β-catenin signaling. Importantly, activity in the β-catenin destruction complex can be increased by tankyrase inhibitors and thus such inhibitors are a potential therapeutic option to reduce the growth of β-catenin-dependent cancers.

== Description ==
Tankyrase-1 is a poly-ADP-ribosyltransferase involved in various processes such as Wnt signaling pathway, telomere length and vesicle trafficking. Acts as an activator of the Wnt signaling pathway by mediating poly-ADP-ribosylation (PARylation) of AXIN1 and AXIN2, 2 key components of the beta-catenin destruction complex: poly-ADP-ribosylated target proteins are recognized by RNF146, which mediates their ubiquitination and subsequent degradation. Also mediates PARsylation of BLZF1 and CASC3, followed by recruitment of RNF146 and subsequent ubiquitination. Mediates PARsylation of TERF1, thereby contributing to the regulation of telomere length. Involved in centrosome maturation during prometaphase by mediating PARsylation of HEPACAM2/MIKI. May also regulate vesicle trafficking and modulate the subcellular distribution of SLC2A4/GLUT4-vesicles. May be involved in spindle pole assembly through PARsylation of NUMA1. Stimulates 26S proteasome activity.

Tankyrase-1 is a poly-ADP-ribosyltransferase involved in various processes such as Wnt signaling pathway, telomere length and vesicle trafficking. Acts as an activator of the Wnt signaling pathway by mediating poly-ADP-ribosylation (PARylation) of AXIN1 and AXIN2, 2 key components of the beta-catenin destruction complex: poly-ADP-ribosylated target proteins are recognized by RNF146, which mediates their ubiquitination and subsequent degradation. Also mediates PARsylation of BLZF1 and CASC3, followed by recruitment of RNF146 and subsequent ubiquitination. Mediates PARsylation of TERF1, thereby contributing to the regulation of telomere length. Involved in centrosome maturation during prometaphase by mediating PARsylation of HEPACAM2/MIKI. May also regulate vesicle trafficking and modulate the subcellular distribution of SLC2A4/GLUT4-vesicles. May be involved in spindle pole assembly through PARsylation of NUMA1. Stimulates 26S proteasome activity.

== Protein interactions ==
TNKS has been shown to interact with:

- FNBP1,
- MCL1,
- TERF1, and
- TNKS1BP1.
