= PPAN =

Protein-coding gene in the species Homo sapiens

Identifiers
- Aliases: PPAN, BXDC3, SSF, SSF-1, SSF1, SSF2, peter pan homolog (Drosophila), peter pan homolog
- External IDs: OMIM: 607793; MGI: 2178445; GeneCards: PPAN

Gene location (Human)
Chr.	Chromosome 19 (human)
Band	19p13.2	Start	10,106,362 bp
Band	19p13.2	End	10,112,012 bp

Gene location (Mouse)
Chr.	Chromosome 9 (mouse)
Band	9|9 A3	Start	20,799,471 bp
Band	9|9 A3	End	20,803,474 bp
RNA expression pattern
Bgee	Human / Mouse (ortholog); Top expressed in: sural nerve; granulocyte; mucosa of transverse colon; gonad; gastrocnemius muscle; parotid gland; skin of leg; skin of abdomen; left uterine tube; apex of heart / Top expressed in: yolk sac; epiblast; bone marrow; embryo; zygote; embryo; secondary oocyte; primary oocyte; placenta; pancreas; More reference expression data
BioGPS	n/a
Gene ontology
Molecular function	rRNA binding; RNA binding
Cellular component	nucleolus; preribosome, large subunit precursor; nucleus
Biological process	ribosomal large subunit assembly
Sources:Amigo / QuickGO
Orthologs
Databases	NCBI: entry; OMA: entry
Species	Human	Mouse
Entrez	56342	235036
Ensembl	ENSG00000130810	ENSMUSG00000004100
UniProt	Q9NQ55	Q91YU8
RefSeq (mRNA)	NM_001346139; NM_001346141; NM_020230	NM_145610
RefSeq (protein)	NP_001035754; NP_001185619	NP_663585
Location (UCSC)	Chr 19: 10.11 – 10.11 Mb	Chr 9: 20.8 – 20.8 Mb
PubMed search
- Wikidata
View/Edit Human	View/Edit Mouse

Suppressor of SWI4 1 homolog is a protein that in humans is encoded by the PPAN gene.

== Gene ==
One of the introns of PPAN encodes the Small nucleolar RNA SNORD105.

This gene was found to cotranscript with P2RY11/P2Y(11), an immediate downstream gene on the chromosome that encodes an ATP receptor.

== Species distribution ==
The protein encoded by this gene is an evolutionarily conserved protein similar to yeast SSF1 as well as to the gene product of the Drosophila gene peter pan (PPAN).

== Tissue distribution ==
Although being involved in ribosome biogenesis, human PPAN is not merely localized in nucleoli, but also in mitochondria.

== Function ==
SSF1 is known to be involved in the second step of mRNA splicing. Both SSF1 and PPAN are essential for cell growth and proliferation.

The chimeric transcripts of this gene and P2RY11 were found to be ubiquitously present and regulated during granulocytic differentiation. Exogenous expression of this gene was reported to reduce the anchorage-independent growth of some tumor cells.

Depletion of PPAN provokes apoptosis as observed by increased amounts of p53 and its target gene p21, BAX-driven depolarisation of mitochondria, cytochrome c release as well as caspase-dependent cleavage of PARP. Recent studies revealed that PPAN participates in the regulation of mitochondrial homeostasis, presumably via modulation of autophagy. Furthermore, PPAN is required for proper cycling of cells since down regulation of PPAN in cancer cells results in a p53-independent cell cycle arrest.
