= WWE protein domain =

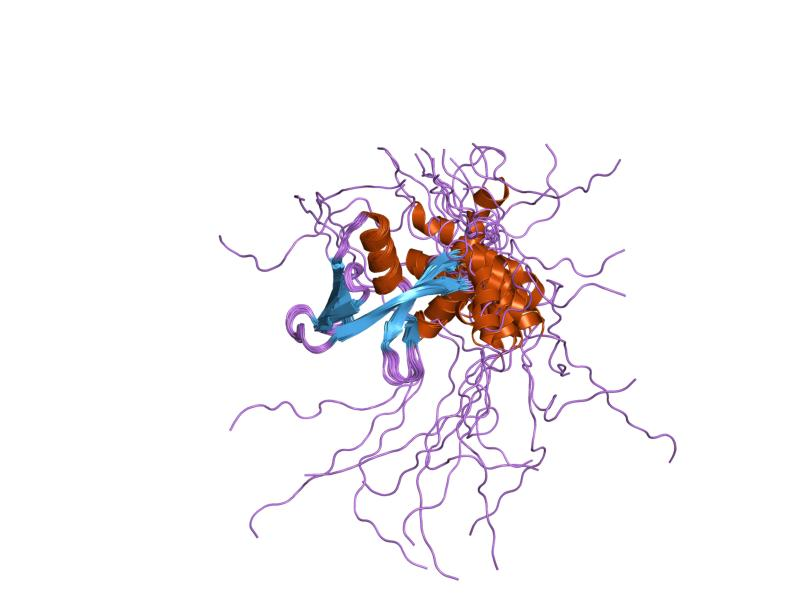
- Solution structure of WWE domain in BAB28015

Identifiers
- Symbol: WWE
- Pfam: PF02825
- InterPro: IPR004170
Available protein structures:
- PDB: IPR004170 PF02825 (ECOD; PDBsum)
- AlphaFold: IPR004170; PF02825

== Function ==
The WWE domains occur in two functional classes of proteins, namely those associated with ubiquitination and those associated with poly-ADP ribosylation (PARP). Hence, WWE domains hold an important function in signal transduction, protein degradation, DNA repair and apoptosis.

== Protein Interactions ==
The WWE domain is named after three of its conserved residues, W and E residues (tryptophans and glutamate respectively), and is predicted to mediate specific protein-protein interactions in ubiquitin and ADP ribose conjugation systems (Poly ADP ribose polymerase). This domain is found as a tandem repeat at the N-terminal of Deltex, a cytosolic effector of Notch signalling thought to bind the N-terminal of the Notch receptor. It is also found as an interaction module in protein ubiquination and ADP ribosylation proteins.

== Structure ==
Within each WWE module, the residues form two similar structures vital to its stability. The two WWE modules interact and form a large cleft suitable for binding of extended polypeptides. The two WWE modules adopt compact structures mostly composed of beta strands, with a single three turn alpha helix in both modules and an additional short helical segment in the second WWE module. The two WWE modules hold a two-fold rotation axis.
