= PINX1 =

Protein-coding gene in the species Homo sapiens

Identifiers
- Aliases: PINX1, LPTL, LPTS, PIN2/TERF1 interacting, telomerase inhibitor 1, Gno1, Pxr1, PIN2/TERF1 interacting telomerase inhibitor 1, PIN2 (TERF1) interacting telomerase inhibitor 1
- External IDs: OMIM: 606505; MGI: 1919650; GeneCards: PINX1

Gene location (Mouse)
Chr.	Chromosome 14 (mouse)
Band	14|14 D1	Start	64,097,813 bp
Band	14|14 D1	End	64,157,308 bp
Gene ontology
Molecular function	protein binding; nucleic acid binding; telomerase RNA binding; telomerase inhibitor activity; protein-containing complex binding
Cellular component	spindle; chromosome; nuclear chromosome; chromosome, centromeric region; kinetochore; nucleolus; nucleus; telomere
Biological process	positive regulation of protein localization to nucleolus; negative regulation of telomere maintenance via telomerase; regulation of protein stability; protein localization to nucleolus; regulation of telomerase activity; protein localization to chromosome, telomeric region; positive regulation of telomeric DNA binding; negative regulation of protein ubiquitination; negative regulation of telomere maintenance via telomere lengthening; mitotic metaphase plate congression; negative regulation of cell population proliferation; negative regulation of telomerase activity; negative regulation of G2/M transition of mitotic cell cycle; telomere maintenance via telomerase
Sources:Amigo / QuickGO
Orthologs
Databases	NCBI: entry; OMA: entry
Species	Human	Mouse
Entrez	54984	72400
Ensembl	ENSG00000254093	ENSMUSG00000021958
UniProt	Q96BK5	Q9CZX5
RefSeq (mRNA)	NM_017884; NM_001284356	NM_028228
RefSeq (protein)	NP_001271285; NP_060354	NP_082504
Location (UCSC)	n/a	Chr 14: 64.1 – 64.16 Mb
PubMed search
- Wikidata
View/Edit Human	View/Edit Mouse

PIN2/TERF1-interacting telomerase inhibitor 1, also known as PINX1, is a human gene. PINX1 is also known as PIN2 interacting protein 1. PINX1 is a telomerase inhibitor and a possible tumor suppressor.

== Interactions ==
PINX1 has been shown to interact with MCRS1, TERF1 and telomerase reverse transcriptase.

== Structure ==
There are two known variants of PINX1. The second variant “lacks an exon in the 3’ coding region which results in a frameshift compared to variant 1. The encoded isoform is shorter and has a distinct C-terminus compared to isoform 1.” There are three PINX1 cDNA clones. The longest one encodes a 328 amino acid 45kDa protein which contains an N-terminal Gly-rich patch and a C-terminal TID domain (telomerase inhibitory domain). The TRF1 binding domain is in the C-terminal 75 amino acids of PINX1. Mouse PINX1 is 74% identical to human PINX1. In other eukaryotes, including yeast, there is an overall 50% similarity to human PINX1.

== Function ==
Over-expression of PINX1 results in decreased telomerase activity, telomere shortening, and induction of crisis. Reduction of PINX1 leads to an increase in telomerase activity and elongation of telomeres. PINX1 differs from other proteins that regulate telomere length in that it acts on telomerase while other proteins adjust telomere length without affecting telomerase activity.

The PINX1 budding yeast orthologue Gnop1 inhibits telomerase by isolating the uncomplexed TERT protein so that it cannot associate with the telomerase template RNA, which prevents telomerase from being assembled. However, in humans, PINX1 impedes already assembled telomerase. PINX1 binds to N-terminus of hTERT and binds to hTR in the presence of hTERT. PINX1 binding to hTR “is correlated to the repressive function of PINX1 on telomerase, implying that the mode of enzyme telomerase inhibition by PINX1 may involve an associated with hTR....The effect of hPINX1 on telomerase appears to be exclusive of the G-patch region and is mediated instead by the C terminus of the protein. This suggests that hPINX1 may have functionally separable cellular effects in which the N terminus is involved in RNA processing via the G-patch, and the C terminus is involved in telomere dynamics.” It is suggested that “PINX1 represses telomerase activity in vivo by binding to the assembled hTERT-hTR complex.”

The TID domain of PINX1 is likely what binds to hTERT. In cells, full-length PINX1 is not as strong as just the TID domain at inhibiting telomerase. This may be due to full-length PINX1 being subject to “endogenous regulation such as posttranslational modifications to reduce its inhibitory activity.” Or it may be due to a reduction of the TID domain to bind and inhibit telomerase as a result of proteins interacting with PINX1, such as PIN2/TRF1 which colocalizes PINX1 in cells.

There are two types of PINX1: nuclear PINX1 which is associates with telomeres and CAC repeats and nucleolar PINX1 does not bind directly to the telomeres, but instead interacts with TRF1. Nucleolar hPINX1 mediates the movement of hTERT and TRF1 to the nucleolus. Over-expression of nucleolar hPINX1 leads to increased TRF1 in the nucleolus and binding to telomeres. However, this accumulation in the nucleolus was not found in ALT (alternative lengthening of telomeres) cells indicating that PINX1 function is telomerase dependent.

hPINX1 is found more in the nucleoplasm during the S phase which is also when telomerase is released into the nucleoplasm indicating that hPINX1 may inhibit telomerase during the S phase.

== Cancer ==
PINX1 is located at 8p23. Heterozygosity of this area is frequently lost in tumors including liver, prostate, colorectal, lung, and head and neck. Most PINX1 mutant tumors are carcinomas. PINX1 expression is significantly reduced in these tumors. This significance was shown with HT1080 cells, which increased tumorigenicity with decreased PINX1 expression. Over-expression of PINX1 in HT1080 cells did not allow them to form tumors in mice. Therefore, PINX1 may be a tumor suppressor.

PINX1 expression is a predictor of cervical squamous cell carcinoma (CSCC) cells response to cisplatin/paclitaxel chemotherapy. High levels of PINX1 correlated to response. But the levels of PINX1 were only associated with cytotoxicity of paclitaxel. Reduced levels of PINX1 led to increased paclitaxel cytotoxicity. “The ability of PINX1 to stabilize the tension between sister kinetochores and maintain the spindle assembly checkpoint was the main reason CSCC cells undergo apoptosis when treated with paclitaxel.”

Chemoradiotherapy is a standard treatment for advanced esophageal squamous cell carcinoma (ESCC). Reduced PINX1 expression did not affect ESCC cells response to 5-fluorouracil and cisplatin, but did increase efficacy of radiation therapy. High levels of PINX1 led to reduced cell death due to radiation. “PINX1 resistance to radiotherapy (RT) was attributed to PINX1 maintaining telomere stability, reducing ESCC cell death by RT-induced mitosis catastrophe.” High levels of PINX1 is a predictor of short disease-specific survival.

PINX1 levels were found to be reduced in urothelial carcinoma of the bladder (UCB) compared to normal urothelial bladder epithelium. “PINX1 levels were inversely correlated with tumor multiplicity, advanced N classification, high proliferation index, and poor survival.” Over-expression of PINX1 reduced UCB cell proliferation and G1/S phase arrest. Knockdown PINX1 led to increased cell proliferation and accelerated G1/S transition.

=== Other cancers ===
- Ovarian
  - PINX1 in 100% of normal ovarian tissue and 66.2% of ovarian carcinomas
  - Decreased PINX1 expression related to poor prognostic factors and presence of lymph node metastasis
- Gastric
  - Loss of heterozygosity of PINX1 gene more common in lymph node metastasis and higher TNM stage
  - Microsatellite instability of PINX1 gene less frequent in cases with lymph node metastasis
  - Suppression of telomerase activity mediated by Mad1/c-Myc pathway
- Esophageal
  - Over-expression of PINX1 inhibited cell growth, arrested cells at G0/G1, and induced apoptosis
- Nasopharyngeal
  - Over-expression of PINX1 decreased hTERT mRNA, reduced telomerase activity, inhibited cell growth, migration and would healing ability, arrested cells in G0/G1 phase, increased apoptosis
  - Down-regulation of PINX1 did not alter any of these characteristics
- Colorectal
  - Intact PINX1 and PINX1 without G-patch motif induce apoptosis, G1 arrest, and cellular senescence
  - Truncated PINX1 does not affect telomerase
- Cervical
  - Regulated by p53
