= NOP2 =

Protein-coding gene in the species Homo sapiens

Identifiers
- Aliases: NOP2, NOL1, NOP120, NSUN1, p120, NOP2 nucleolar protein
- External IDs: OMIM: 164031; MGI: 107891; GeneCards: NOP2

Gene location (Human)
Chr.	Chromosome 12 (human)
Band	12p13.31	Start	6,556,863 bp
Band	12p13.31	End	6,568,691 bp

Gene location (Mouse)
Chr.	Chromosome 6 (mouse)
Band	6 F2|6 59.32 cM	Start	125,108,872 bp
Band	6 F2|6 59.32 cM	End	125,121,716 bp
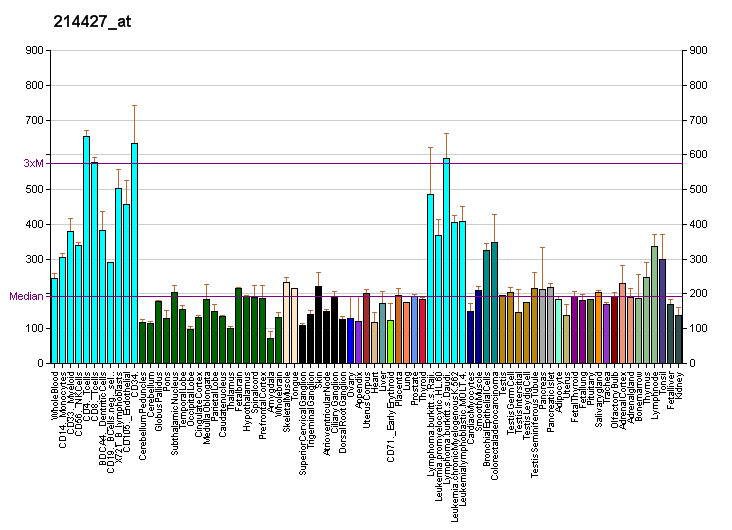
RNA expression pattern
Bgee	Human / Mouse (ortholog); Top expressed in: granulocyte; lymph node; appendix; spleen; left uterine tube; gastrocnemius muscle; islet of Langerhans; right lobe of thyroid gland; anterior pituitary; tonsil / Top expressed in: epiblast; otic placode; otic vesicle; morula; morula; superior surface of tongue; gallbladder; somite; embryo; embryo; More reference expression data
BioGPS	More reference expression data
Gene ontology
Molecular function	methyltransferase activity; transferase activity; protein binding; S-adenosylmethionine-dependent methyltransferase activity; rRNA (cytosine-C5-)-methyltransferase activity; RNA binding
Cellular component	nucleus; nucleolus; nucleoplasm
Biological process	rRNA processing; methylation; rRNA base methylation; maturation of LSU-rRNA; positive regulation of cell population proliferation; regulation of transcription by RNA polymerase II; ribosomal large subunit assembly; regulation of signal transduction by p53 class mediator; ribosome biogenesis
Sources:Amigo / QuickGO
Orthologs
Databases	NCBI: entry; OMA: entry
Species	Human	Mouse
Entrez	4839	110109
Ensembl	ENSG00000111641	ENSMUSG00000038279
UniProt	P46087	Q922K7
RefSeq (mRNA)	NM_001033714; NM_001258308; NM_001258309; NM_001258310; NM_006170	NM_138747
RefSeq (protein)	NP_001028886; NP_001245237; NP_001245238; NP_001245239; NP_006161	n/a
Location (UCSC)	Chr 12: 6.56 – 6.57 Mb	Chr 6: 125.11 – 125.12 Mb
PubMed search
- Wikidata
View/Edit Human	View/Edit Mouse

NOP2 nucleolar protein, also called 28S rRNA (cytosine(4447)-C(5))-methyltransferase, is an enzyme that in humans is encoded by the NOP2 gene (previously NOL1).

The protein encoded by this gene is a nucleolar antigen expressed in proliferating cells. It is not detectable in non-proliferating normal tissue but is detectable in many human tumors.

Overexpression of p120 leads to malignant transformation of 3T3 cells while treatment with antisense p120 mRNA causes the transformed cells to revert to their original non-malignant phenotype. The p120 protein displays a dramatic increase in expression at the G1/S transition suggesting that p120 regulates the cell cycle and nucleolar activity that is required for cell proliferation.

== Interactions ==
NOP2 has been shown to interact with MCRS1.
