= Small nucleolar RNA SNORD105 =

Human nucleolar RNA component

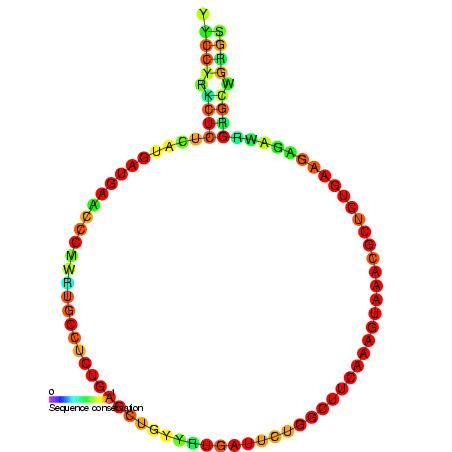
- Predicted secondary structure and sequence conservation of SNORD105

Identifiers
- Symbol: SNORD105
- Alt. Symbols: snoU105
- Rfam: RF00584

Other data
- RNA type: Gene; snRNA; snoRNA; CD-box
- Domain: Eukaryota
- GO: GO:0006396 GO:0005730
- SO: SO:0001263
- PDB structures: PDBe

In molecular biology, U105 belongs to the C/D family of snoRNAs. It is encoded in an intron of the Peter pan homolog gene and is predicted to guide 2'O-ribose methylation of residue U799 of the small 18S rRNA subunit.
