= MCRS1 =

Identifiers
- Aliases: MCRS1, ICP22BP, INO80Q, MCRS2, MSP58, P78, microspherule protein 1
- External IDs: OMIM: 609504; MGI: 1858420; GeneCards: MCRS1

Gene location (Human)
Chr.	Chromosome 12 (human)
Band	12q13.12	Start	49,556,544 bp
Band	12q13.12	End	49,568,145 bp

Gene location (Mouse)
Chr.	Chromosome 15 (mouse)
Band	15|15 F1	Start	99,140,698 bp
Band	15|15 F1	End	99,149,842 bp
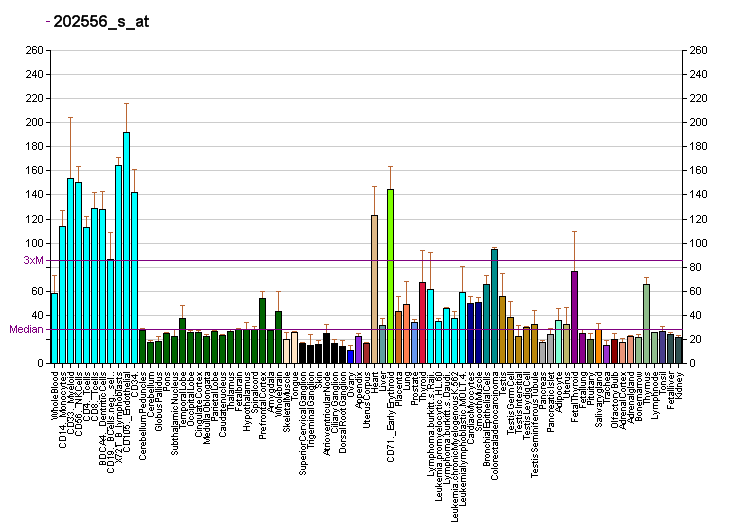
RNA expression pattern
Bgee	Human / Mouse (ortholog); Top expressed in: apex of heart; granulocyte; left ventricle; right auricle of heart; right lobe of thyroid gland; left lobe of thyroid gland; mucosa of transverse colon; right frontal lobe; body of stomach; left testis / Top expressed in: mesencephalon; neural tube; ganglionic eminence; spermatocyte; ventricular zone; epiblast; spermatid; neural layer of retina; limb; muscle tissue; More reference expression data
BioGPS	More reference expression data
Gene ontology
Molecular function	poly(U) RNA binding; histone acetyltransferase activity (H4-K8 specific); histone acetyltransferase activity (H4-K5 specific); poly(G) binding; protein binding; histone acetyltransferase activity (H4-K16 specific); telomerase inhibitor activity; G-quadruplex RNA binding
Cellular component	nucleoplasm; nucleolus; histone acetyltransferase complex; nucleus; dendrite; cytoplasm; polysome; perikaryon; endoplasmic reticulum; Ino80 complex; MLL1 complex; NSL complex
Biological process	positive regulation of protein localization to nucleolus; DNA recombination; regulation of transcription, DNA-templated; negative regulation of telomerase activity; transcription, DNA-templated; histone H4-K5 acetylation; cellular response to DNA damage stimulus; negative regulation of telomere maintenance via telomere lengthening; histone H4-K16 acetylation; histone H4-K8 acetylation; DNA repair; protein deubiquitination; chromatin organization; positive regulation of transcription by RNA polymerase II
Sources:Amigo / QuickGO
Orthologs
Databases	NCBI: entry; OMA: entry
Species	Human	Mouse
Entrez	10445	51812
Ensembl	ENSG00000187778	ENSMUSG00000037570
UniProt	Q96EZ8	Q99L90
RefSeq (mRNA)	NM_001012300; NM_001278341; NM_006337	NM_001164156; NM_016766
RefSeq (protein)	NP_001012300; NP_001265270; NP_006328	NP_001157628; NP_058046
Location (UCSC)	Chr 12: 49.56 – 49.57 Mb	Chr 15: 99.14 – 99.15 Mb
PubMed search
- Wikidata
View/Edit Human	View/Edit Mouse

Microspherule protein 1 is a protein that in humans is encoded by the MCRS1 gene.

== Interactions ==
MCRS1 has been shown to interact with PHC2, Death associated protein 6, NOP2, PINX1 and Telomerase reverse transcriptase.
