= Apoptosis-inducing factor =

Protein family

apoptosis-inducing factor, mitochondrion-associated, 1
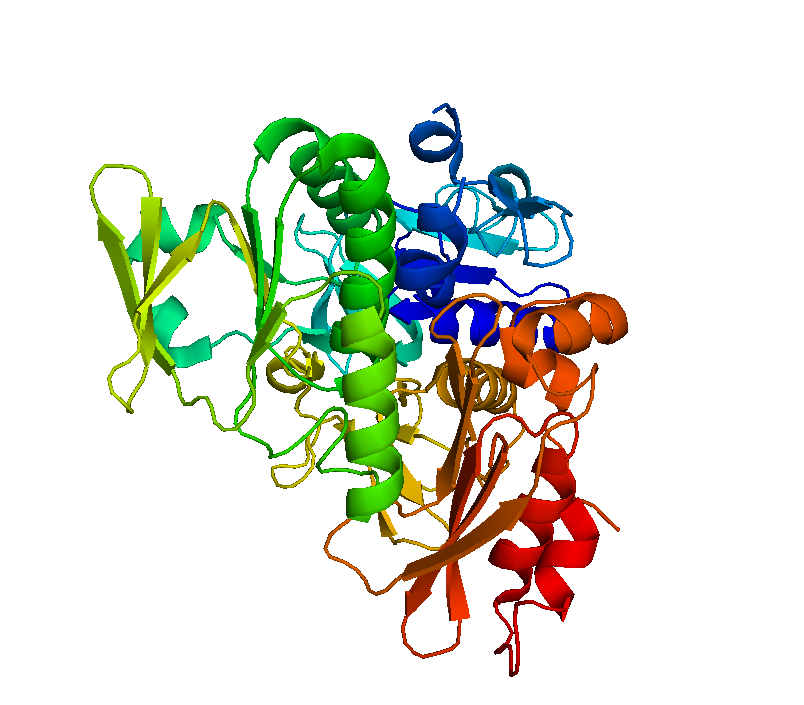
- Crystallographic structure of the human apoptosis inducing factor (rainbow color cartoon diagram, N-terminus = blue, C-terminus = red).

Identifiers
- Symbol: AIFM1
- Alt. symbols: PDCD8
- NCBI gene: 9131
- HGNC: 8768
- OMIM: 300169
- RefSeq: NM_004208
- UniProt: O95831

Other data
- Locus: Chr. X q25-q26
Search for
- Structures: Swiss-model
- Domains: InterPro

Apoptosis inducing factor is involved in initiating a caspase-independent pathway of apoptosis (positive intrinsic regulator of apoptosis) by causing DNA fragmentation and chromatin condensation. Apoptosis inducing factor is a flavoprotein. It also acts as an NADH oxidase. Another AIF function is to regulate the permeability of the mitochondrial membrane upon apoptosis. Normally it is found behind the outer membrane of the mitochondrion and is therefore secluded from the nucleus. However, when the mitochondrion is damaged, it moves to the cytosol and to the nucleus. Inactivation of AIF leads to resistance of embryonic stem cells to death following the withdrawal of growth factors indicating that it is involved in apoptosis.

== Function ==
Apoptosis Inducing Factor (AIF) is a protein that triggers chromatin condensation and DNA fragmentation in a cell in order to induce programmed cell death. The mitochondrial AIF protein was found to be a caspase-independent death effector that can allow independent nuclei to undergo apoptotic changes. The process triggering apoptosis starts when the mitochondrion releases AIF, which exits through the mitochondrial membrane, enters the cytosol, and moves to the nucleus of the cell, where it signals the cell to condense its chromosomes and fragment its DNA molecules in order to prepare for cell death. Recently, researchers have discovered that the activity of AIF depends on the type of cell, the apoptotic insult, and its DNA-binding ability. AIF also plays a significant role in the mitochondrial respiratory chain and metabolic redox reactions.

== Synthesis ==
The AIF protein is located across 16 exons on the X chromosome in humans. AIF1 (the most abundant type of AIF) is translated in the cytosol and recruited to the mitochondrial membrane and intermembrane space by its N-terminal mitochondrial localization signal (MLS). Inside the mitochondrion, AIF folds into its functional configuration with the help of the cofactor flavin adenine dinucleotide (FAD).

A protein called Scythe (BAT3), which is used to regulate organogenesis, can increase the AIF lifetime in the cell. As a result, decreased amounts of Scythe lead to a quicker fragmentation of AIF. The X-linked inhibitor of apoptosis (XIAP) has the power to influence the half-life of AIF along with Scythe. Together, the two do not affect the AIF attached to the inner mitochondrial membrane, however they influence the stability of AIF once it exits the mitochondrion.

== Role in mitochondria ==
It was thought that if a recombinant version of AIF lacked the first N-terminal 120 amino acids of the protein, then AIF would function as an NADH and NADPH oxidase. However, it was instead discovered that recombinant AIF that do not have the last 100 N-terminal amino acids have limited NADP and NADPH oxidase activity. Therefore, researchers concluded that the AIF N-terminus may function in interactions with other proteins or control AIF redox reactions and substrate specificity.

Mutations of AIF due to deletions have stimulated the creation of the mouse model of complex I deficiency. Complex I deficiency is the reason behind over thirty percent of human mitochondrial diseases. For example, complex I mitochondriopathies mostly affect infants by causing symptoms such as seizures, blindness, deafness, etc. These AIF-deficient mouse models are important for fixing complex I deficiencies. The identification of AIF-interacting proteins in the inner mitochondrial membrane and intermembrane space will help researchers identify the mechanism of the signalling pathway that monitors the function of AIF in the mitochondria.

== Isozymes ==
Human genes encoding apoptosis inducing factor isozymes include:

- AIFM1
- AIFM2
- AIFM3

== Evolution ==
The apoptotic function of AIFs has been shown in organisms belonging to different eukaryotic organisms including mentioned above human factors: AIM1, AIM2, and AIM3 (Xie et al., 2005), yeast factors NDI1 and AIF1 as well as AIF of Tetrahymena. Phylogenetic analysis indicates that the divergence of the AIFM1, AIFM2, AIFM3, and NDI sequences occurred before the divergence of eukaryotes.

== Role in cancer ==
Despite an involvement in cell death, AIF plays a contributory role to the growth and aggressiveness of a variety of cancer types including colorectal, prostate, and pancreatic cancers through its NADH oxidase activity. AIF enzymatic activity regulates metabolism but can also increase ROS levels promoting oxidative stress activated signaling molecules including the MAPKs. AIF-mediated redox signaling promotes the activation of JNK1, which in turn can trigger the cadherin switch.

== See also ==
- Apoptosis
- Parthanatos
