= AIFM2 =

Protein-coding gene in the species Homo sapiens

Identifiers
- Aliases: AIFM2, AMID, PRG3, apoptosis inducing factor, mitochondria associated 2, apoptosis inducing factor mitochondria associated 2, FSP1
- External IDs: OMIM: 605159; MGI: 1918611; GeneCards: AIFM2

Gene location (Human)
| Chr. | Chromosome 10 (human) |
| Band | 10q22.1 | Start | 70,098,223 bp |
| Band | 10q22.1 | End | 70,132,934 bp |

Gene location (Mouse)
| Chr. | Chromosome 10 (mouse) |
| Band | 10|10 B4 | Start | 61,551,042 bp |
| Band | 10|10 B4 | End | 61,575,039 bp |
RNA expression pattern
| Bgee | Human / Mouse (ortholog); Top expressed in: adipose tissue; subcutaneous adipose tissue; abdominal fat; mucosa of transverse colon; apex of heart; left ventricle; right lobe of thyroid gland; left coronary artery; left lobe of thyroid gland; right lobe of liver / Top expressed in: brown adipose tissue; white adipose tissue; adrenal gland; subcutaneous adipose tissue; intercostal muscle; adrenal medulla; mammary gland; lumbar subsegment of spinal cord; urinary bladder; esophagus; More reference expression data |
| BioGPS | n/a |
Gene ontology
| Molecular function | electron-transferring-flavoprotein dehydrogenase activity; DNA binding; oxidoreductase activity; flavin adenine dinucleotide binding |
| Cellular component | cytoplasm; integral component of membrane; cytosol; lipid droplet; membrane; mitochondrion; mitochondrial outer membrane; extracellular space |
| Biological process | apoptotic process; apoptotic mitochondrial changes; positive regulation of apoptotic process; regulation of apoptotic process; respiratory electron transport chain |
Sources:Amigo / QuickGO
Orthologs
| Databases | NCBI: entry; OMA: entry |
| Species | Human | Mouse |
| Entrez | 84883 | 71361 |
| Ensembl | ENSG00000042286 | ENSMUSG00000020085 |
| UniProt | Q9BRQ8 | Q8BUE4 |
| RefSeq (mRNA) | NM_032797; NM_001198696 | NM_001039194; NM_001284300; NM_153779; NM_178058 |
| RefSeq (protein) | NP_001185625; NP_116186 | NP_001034283; NP_001271229; NP_722474; NP_835159 |
| Location (UCSC) | Chr 10: 70.1 – 70.13 Mb | Chr 10: 61.55 – 61.58 Mb |
| PubMed search |
- Wikidata
| View/Edit Human | View/Edit Mouse |

Apoptosis-inducing factor 2 (AIFM2), also known as ferroptosis suppressor protein 1 (FSP1), apoptosis-inducing factor-homologous mitochondrion-associated inducer of death (AMID), is a protein that in humans is encoded by the AIFM2 gene, also known as p53-responsive gene 3 (PRG3), on chromosome 10.

This gene encodes a flavoprotein oxidoreductase that reduces coenzyme Q10, vitamin E, and vitamin K.

== Evolution ==
Phylogenetic studies indicate that the divergence of AIFM1 and other AIFs occurred before the divergence of eukaryotes.

== Gene ==
Sequence analysis reveals that the AIFM2 gene promoter contains a consensus transcription initiator sequence instead of a TATA box. The AIFM2 gene also contains a putative p53-binding element in intron 5, suggesting that its gene expression can be activated by p53.

== Subcellular distribution ==
Although AIFM2 lacks a recognizable mitochondrial localization sequence and cannot enter the mitochondria, it is found associated with the outer mitochondrial membrane (OMM), where it forms a ring-like structure.

FSP1 also acts at the plasma membrane and at internal organelle membranes, including lipid droplets, where it protects stored neutral lipids.

== Structure ==
AIFM2 can be found in both prokaryotes and eukaryotes. Two deletion mutations at the N-terminal (aa 1–185 and 1–300) result in nuclear localization and failure to effect cell death, suggesting that AIFM2 must be associated with the mitochondria in order to induce apoptosis. Moreover, domain mapping experiments reveal that only the C-terminal 187 aa is required for apoptotic induction. Mutations in the N-terminal putative FAD- and ADP-binding domains, which are responsible for its oxidoreductase function, do not affect its apoptotic function, indicating that these two functions operate independently. It assembles stoichiometrically and noncovalently with 6-hydroxy-FAD.

== Function ==
The AIFM2 gene encodes the FSP1 protein, which has significant homology to NADH oxidoreductases and the apoptosis-inducing factor PDCD8/AIF. Although it was originally proposed that this protein induces apoptosis due to its similarity with AIF, findings from James Olzmann's group at UC Berkeley and Marcus Conrad's group at the Helmholtz Institute demonstrated that the primary cellular function of FSP1 is to suppress lipid peroxidation and the induction of the regulated, non-apoptotic cell death pathway known as ferroptosis.

Mechanistically, FSP1 reduces oxidized coenzyme Q10 (i.e., ubiquinone) to its reduced form (i.e., ubiquinol), which functions as a lipophilic antioxidant that prevents the propagation of lipid peroxidation. FSP1 may also act through the reduction of other molecules that function as radical-trapping antioxidants, such as vitamin E and vitamin K.

== Clinical significance ==
FSP1 is upregulated in several cancers, and its upregulation correlates with poor prognosis. FSP1 is a NRF2 target gene and contributes to NRF2-dependent ferroptosis resistance. Loss of FSP1 in preclinical mouse models results in a reduction in tumor growth.

Inhibitors of FSP1 have been identified that induce or sensitize cells to ferroptosis. icFSP1 has been shown to cause dissociation of FSP1 from the membrane and phase separation of FSP1 into droplets. More commonly used FSP1 inhibitors include FSEN1 and iFSP1, which are both direct competitive inhibitors selective for human FSP1. Whether FSP1 is an important therapeutic target remains to be determined.

== Interactions ==
AIFM2 is shown to interact with p53.

AIFM2 is not inhibited by Bcl-2.

AIFM2 can also bind the following coenzymes:

- 6-hydroxy-FAD,
- Flavin adenine dinucleotide (FAD),
- NADPH/NADP+,
- NADH/NAD+, and
- pyridine nucleotide coenzyme.
