= MAPRE1 =

Protein-coding gene in the species Homo sapiens

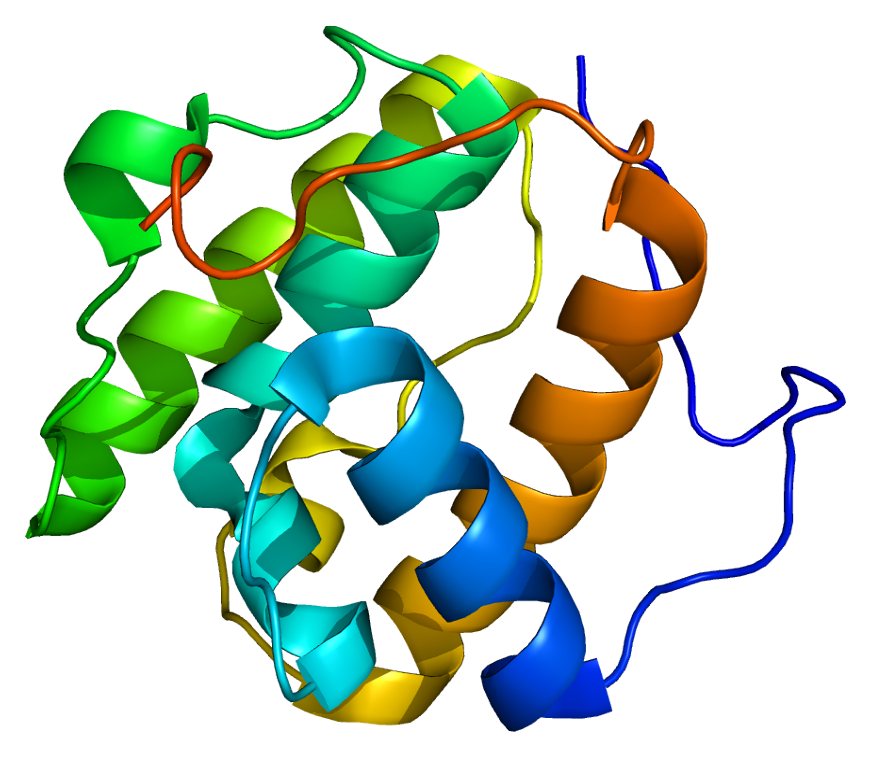

Identifiers
- Aliases: MAPRE1, EB1, microtubule associated protein RP/EB family member 1
- External IDs: OMIM: 603108; MGI: 891995; GeneCards: MAPRE1
Available structures
| PDB | Ortholog search: PDBe RCSB |
| PDB | List of PDB id codes 1PA7, 1TXQ, 1UEG, 1VKA, 1WU9, 1YIB, 1YIG, 2HKQ, 2HL3, 2HL5, 2QJZ, 2R8U, 3GJO, 3MTU, 3TQ7, 4XA1, 4XA3, 4XA6 |

Gene location (Human)
| Chr. | Chromosome 20 (human) |
| Band | 20q11.21 | Start | 32,819,954 bp |
| Band | 20q11.21 | End | 32,850,405 bp |

Gene location (Mouse)
| Chr. | Chromosome 2 (mouse) |
| Band | 2 H1|2 75.95 cM | Start | 153,583,194 bp |
| Band | 2 H1|2 75.95 cM | End | 153,615,230 bp |
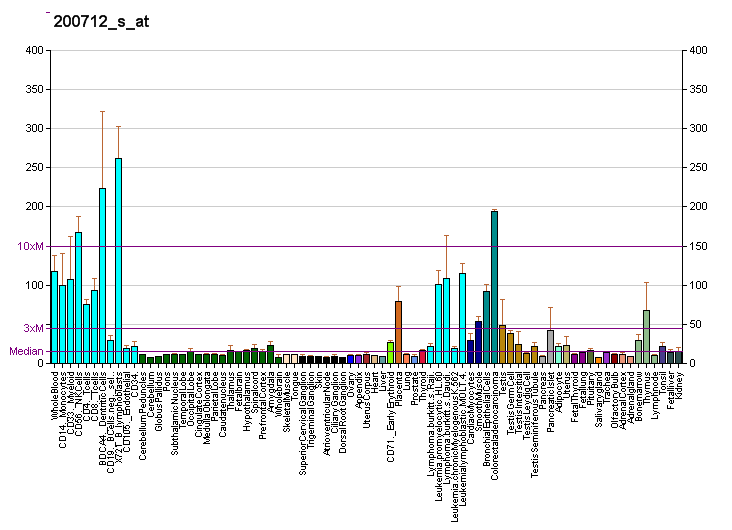

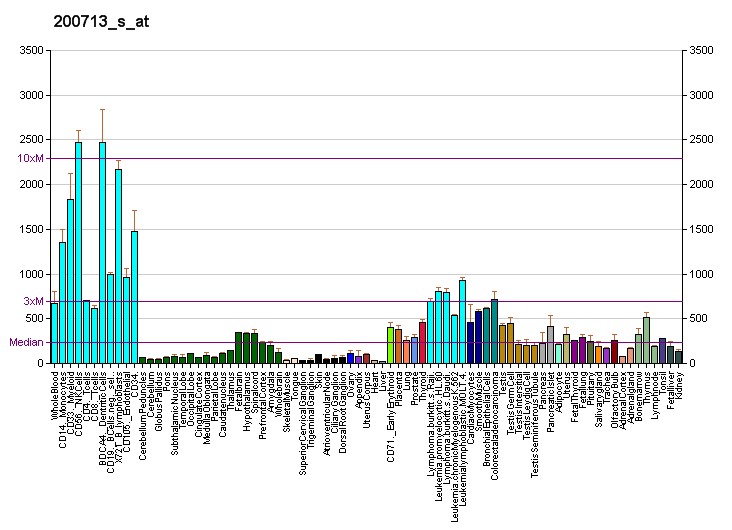
RNA expression pattern
| Bgee | Human / Mouse (ortholog); Top expressed in: secondary oocyte; ganglionic eminence; ventricular zone; islet of Langerhans; cartilage tissue; mononuclear cell; monocyte; bone marrow; tail of epididymis; mucosa of sigmoid colon / Top expressed in: medial ganglionic eminence; human fetus; retinal pigment epithelium; dermis; atrioventricular valve; maxillary prominence; atrium; epithelium of lens; mandibular prominence; endocardial cushion; More reference expression data |
| BioGPS | More reference expression data |
Gene ontology
| Molecular function | protein binding; microtubule binding; protein C-terminus binding; microtubule plus-end binding; identical protein binding; RNA binding; cadherin binding; protein kinase binding |
| Cellular component | microtubule plus-end; microtubule cytoskeleton; microtubule organizing center; cortical microtubule cytoskeleton; cell projection membrane; Golgi apparatus; centrosome; cytoskeleton; cell projection; spindle; cytoplasmic microtubule; cytosol; microtubule; cytoplasm; focal adhesion; spindle midzone; mitotic spindle astral microtubule end |
| Biological process | G2/M transition of mitotic cell cycle; positive regulation of microtubule plus-end binding; cell population proliferation; negative regulation of microtubule polymerization; cell division; cell cycle; protein localization to microtubule; sister chromatid cohesion; negative regulation of microtubule binding; positive regulation of cell migration; ciliary basal body-plasma membrane docking; regulation of microtubule cytoskeleton organization; regulation of G2/M transition of mitotic cell cycle; protein localization; cell migration; regulation of microtubule polymerization or depolymerization; positive regulation of microtubule polymerization; spindle assembly; protein localization to microtubule plus-end |
Sources:Amigo / QuickGO
Orthologs
| Databases | NCBI: entry; OMA: entry |
| Species | Human | Mouse |
| Entrez | 22919 | 13589 |
| Ensembl | ENSG00000101367 | ENSMUSG00000027479 |
| UniProt | Q15691 | Q61166 |
| RefSeq (mRNA) | NM_012325 | NM_007896 |
| RefSeq (protein) | NP_036457 | NP_031922 |
| Location (UCSC) | Chr 20: 32.82 – 32.85 Mb | Chr 2: 153.58 – 153.62 Mb |
| PubMed search |
- Wikidata
| View/Edit Human | View/Edit Mouse |

Microtubule-associated protein RP/EB family member 1 is a protein that in humans is encoded by the MAPRE1 gene.

== Function ==
The protein encoded by this gene was first identified by its binding to the APC (Adenomatous polyposis coli) protein which is often mutated in familial and sporadic forms of colorectal cancer.

Immunofluorescence has demonstrated that EB1 localizes to the centrosome, mitotic spindle, and distal tips of cytoplasmic microtubules. Throughout the cell cycle, EB1 proteins situate on the microtubule plus ends, which is why EB1 is categorized as a microtubule plus end tracking protein(+TIP protein).

The protein also associates with components of the dynactin complex and the intermediate chain of cytoplasmic dynein. Because of these associations, it is thought that this protein is involved in the regulation of microtubule structures and chromosome stability. This gene is a member of the RP/EB family.

== Interactions ==
MAPRE1 has been shown to interact with TERF1.
