= PARP16 =

Protein-coding gene in the species Homo sapiens

Identifiers
- Aliases: PARP16, ARTD15, C15orf30, pART15, poly(ADP-ribose) polymerase family member 16
- External IDs: MGI: 2446133; GeneCards: PARP16
Available structures
PDB	Ortholog search: PDBe RCSB
PDB	List of PDB id codes 4F0D

Gene location (Human)
Chr.	Chromosome 15 (human)
Band	15q22.31	Start	65,234,460 bp
Band	15q22.31	End	65,300,618 bp

Gene location (Mouse)
Chr.	Chromosome 9 (mouse)
Band	9|9 C	Start	65,102,635 bp
Band	9|9 C	End	65,146,506 bp
RNA expression pattern
Bgee	Human / Mouse (ortholog); Top expressed in: secondary oocyte; gonad; testicle; Achilles tendon; canal of the cervix; ganglionic eminence; left ovary; right ovary; granulocyte; right lobe of liver / Top expressed in: saccule; otic vesicle; lacrimal gland; liver; right kidney; Ileal epithelium; islet of Langerhans; granulocyte; proximal tubule; brown adipose tissue; More reference expression data
BioGPS	n/a
Gene ontology
Molecular function	transferase activity; kinase binding; protein serine/threonine kinase activator activity; protein binding; glycosyltransferase activity; NAD+ ADP-ribosyltransferase activity; protein ADP-ribosylase activity
Cellular component	integral component of membrane; nuclear envelope; endoplasmic reticulum; endoplasmic reticulum membrane; membrane; endoplasmic reticulum tubular network; cytosol
Biological process	endoplasmic reticulum unfolded protein response; protein auto-ADP-ribosylation; response to unfolded protein; protein ADP-ribosylation; negative regulation of cell death; positive regulation of protein serine/threonine kinase activity; NAD biosynthesis via nicotinamide riboside salvage pathway; cellular response to leukemia inhibitory factor; IRE1-mediated unfolded protein response; protein mono-ADP-ribosylation
Sources:Amigo / QuickGO
Orthologs
Databases	NCBI: entry; OMA: entry
Species	Human	Mouse
Entrez	54956	214424
Ensembl	ENSG00000138617	ENSMUSG00000032392
UniProt	Q8N5Y8	Q7TMM8
RefSeq (mRNA)	NM_017851; NM_001316943; NM_001316944	NM_177460
RefSeq (protein)	NP_001303872; NP_001303873; NP_060321	NP_803411
Location (UCSC)	Chr 15: 65.23 – 65.3 Mb	Chr 9: 65.1 – 65.15 Mb
PubMed search
- Wikidata
View/Edit Human	View/Edit Mouse

Poly (ADP-ribose) polymerase family, member 16 is a protein in humans that is encoded by the PARP16 gene.
