= GRB14 =

Protein-coding gene in the species Homo sapiens

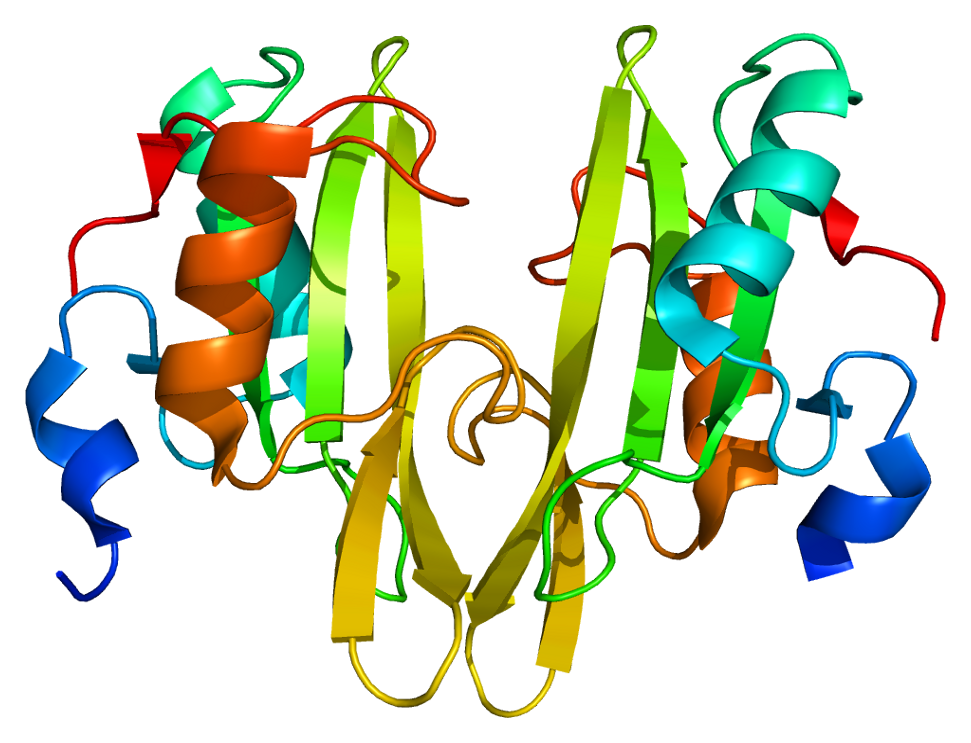

Identifiers
- Aliases: GRB14, growth factor receptor bound protein 14
- External IDs: OMIM: 601524; MGI: 1355324; GeneCards: GRB14
Available structures
| PDB | Ortholog search: PDBe RCSB |
| PDB | List of PDB id codes 2AUG, 2AUH, 4K81 |

Gene location (Human)
| Chr. | Chromosome 2 (human) |
| Band | 2q24.3 | Start | 164,492,417 bp |
| Band | 2q24.3 | End | 164,621,482 bp |

Gene location (Mouse)
| Chr. | Chromosome 2 (mouse) |
| Band | 2|2 C1.3 | Start | 64,742,820 bp |
| Band | 2|2 C1.3 | End | 64,855,331 bp |
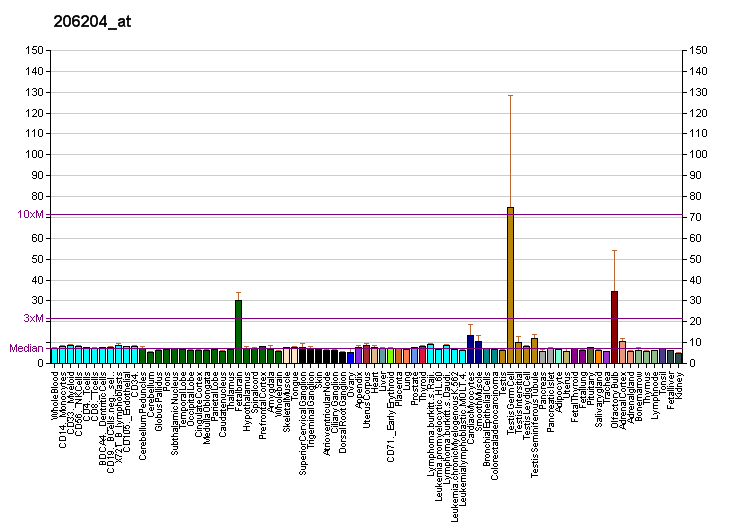
RNA expression pattern
| Bgee | Human / Mouse (ortholog); Top expressed in: right lobe of liver; corpus epididymis; left adrenal cortex; right adrenal gland; right adrenal cortex; right testis; body of tongue; renal medulla; left testis; body of pancreas / Top expressed in: interventricular septum; vestibular membrane of cochlear duct; myocardium of ventricle; cardiac muscles; right ventricle; trigeminal ganglion; atrium; digastric muscle; soleus muscle; sciatic nerve; More reference expression data |
| BioGPS | More reference expression data |
Gene ontology
| Molecular function | receptor tyrosine kinase binding; identical protein binding; protein homodimerization activity |
| Cellular component | cytoplasm; cytosol; endosome; plasma membrane; endosome membrane; intracellular membrane-bounded organelle; membrane |
| Biological process | positive regulation of signal transduction; leukocyte migration; signal transduction; negative regulation of insulin receptor signaling pathway; insulin receptor signaling pathway |
Sources:Amigo / QuickGO
Orthologs
| Databases | NCBI: entry; OMA: entry |
| Species | Human | Mouse |
| Entrez | 2888 | 50915 |
| Ensembl | ENSG00000115290 | ENSMUSG00000026888 |
| UniProt | Q14449 | Q9JLM9 |
| RefSeq (mRNA) | NM_001303422; NM_004490 | NM_016719 |
| RefSeq (protein) | NP_001290351; NP_004481 | NP_057928 |
| Location (UCSC) | Chr 2: 164.49 – 164.62 Mb | Chr 2: 64.74 – 64.86 Mb |
| PubMed search |
- Wikidata
| View/Edit Human | View/Edit Mouse |

Growth factor receptor-bound protein 14 is a protein that in humans is encoded by the GRB14 gene.

The product of this gene belongs to a small family of adapter proteins that are known to interact with a number of receptor tyrosine kinases and signaling molecules. This gene encodes a growth factor receptor-binding protein that interacts with insulin receptors and insulin-like growth-factor receptors. This protein likely has an inhibitory effect on receptor tyrosine kinase signaling and, in particular, on insulin receptor signaling. This gene may play a role in signaling pathways that regulate growth and metabolism. Transcript variants have been reported for this gene, but their full-length natures have not been determined to date.

== Interactions ==
GRB14 has been shown to interact with Epidermal growth factor receptor, Fibroblast growth factor receptor 1 and TNKS2.
