= CASC3 =

Protein-coding gene in the species Homo sapiens

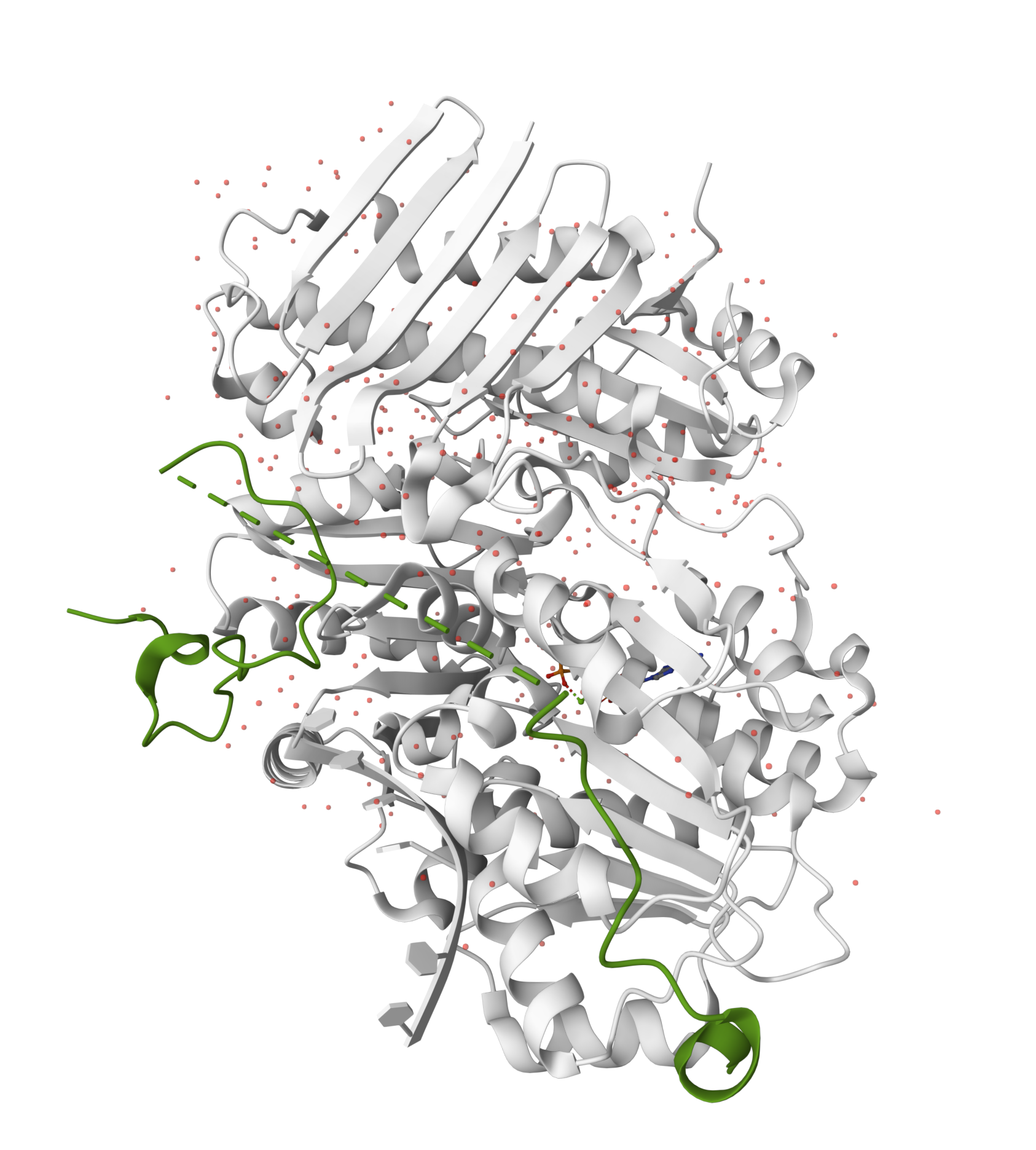

Identifiers
- Aliases: CASC3, BTZ, MLN51, cancer susceptibility candidate 3, cancer susceptibility 3, exon junction complex subunit, CASC3 exon junction complex subunit
- External IDs: OMIM: 606504; MGI: 2179723; GeneCards: CASC3
Available structures
PDB	Ortholog search: PDBe RCSB
PDB	List of PDB id codes 2HYI, 2J0Q, 2J0S, 2J0U, 2XB2, 3EX7

Gene location (Human)
Chr.	Chromosome 17 (human)
Band	17q21.1	Start	40,140,318 bp
Band	17q21.1	End	40,172,171 bp

Gene location (Mouse)
Chr.	Chromosome 11 (mouse)
Band	11|11 D	Start	98,695,731 bp
Band	11|11 D	End	98,724,640 bp
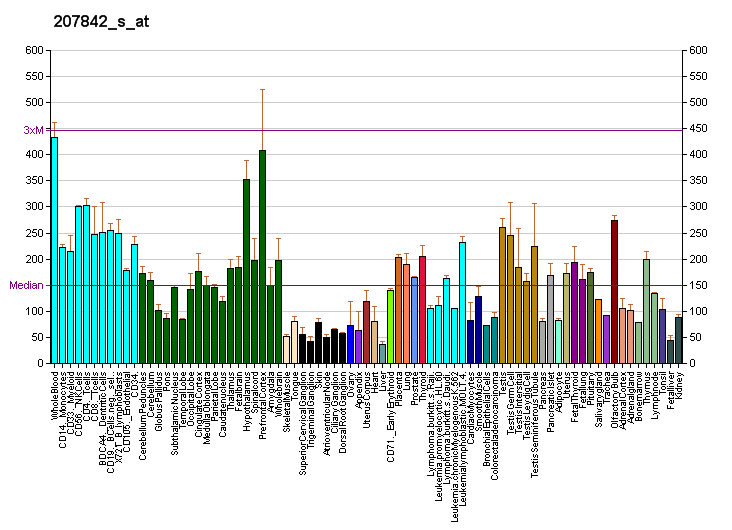
RNA expression pattern
Bgee	Human / Mouse (ortholog); Top expressed in: sural nerve; middle frontal gyrus; gastric mucosa; ganglionic eminence; paraflocculus of cerebellum; body of uterus; Brodmann area 10; popliteal artery; tibial arteries; ventricular zone / Top expressed in: tail of embryo; neural layer of retina; granulocyte; genital tubercle; ventricular zone; epiblast; cumulus cell; ankle joint; yolk sac; Rostral migratory stream; More reference expression data
BioGPS	More reference expression data
Gene ontology
Molecular function	protein binding; identical protein binding; enzyme binding; ubiquitin protein ligase binding; RNA binding
Cellular component	cytoplasm; cytosol; nuclear speck; exon-exon junction complex; perinuclear region of cytoplasm; nucleus; nucleoplasm; nuclear membrane; cytoplasmic stress granule; dendrite; cytoplasmic ribonucleoprotein granule; cell projection; ribonucleoprotein complex; U2-type catalytic step 1 spliceosome; spliceosomal complex
Biological process	mRNA transport; mRNA processing; intracellular mRNA localization; RNA splicing; nuclear-transcribed mRNA catabolic process, nonsense-mediated decay; regulation of translation; mRNA splicing, via spliceosome; RNA export from nucleus; termination of RNA polymerase II transcription; mRNA export from nucleus; mRNA 3'-end processing; transport; biological process
Sources:Amigo / QuickGO
Orthologs
Databases	NCBI: entry; OMA: entry
Species	Human	Mouse
Entrez	22794	192160
Ensembl	ENSG00000108349	ENSMUSG00000078676
UniProt	O15234	Q8K3W3
RefSeq (mRNA)	NM_007359	NM_138660
RefSeq (protein)	NP_031385	NP_619601
Location (UCSC)	Chr 17: 40.14 – 40.17 Mb	Chr 11: 98.7 – 98.72 Mb
PubMed search
- Wikidata
View/Edit Human	View/Edit Mouse

Protein CASC3 is a protein that in humans is encoded by the CASC3 gene.

== Function ==
The product of this gene is a core component of the exon junction complex (EJC), a protein complex that is deposited on spliced mRNAs at exon-exon junctions and functions in nonsense-mediated mRNA decay (NMD). The encoded protein binds RNA and interacts with two other EJC core components. It is predominantly located in the cytoplasm, but shuttles into the nucleus where it localizes to nuclear speckles.
