= AIFM3 =

Protein-coding gene in the species Homo sapiens

Identifiers
- Aliases: AIFM3, AIFL, apoptosis inducing factor, mitochondria associated 3, apoptosis inducing factor mitochondria associated 3
- External IDs: OMIM: 617298; MGI: 1919418; GeneCards: AIFM3

Gene location (Human)
Chr.	Chromosome 22 (human)
Band	22q11.21	Start	20,965,108 bp
Band	22q11.21	End	20,981,360 bp

Gene location (Mouse)
Chr.	Chromosome 16 (mouse)
Band	16|16 A3	Start	17,489,611 bp
Band	16|16 A3	End	17,507,485 bp
RNA expression pattern
Bgee	Human / Mouse (ortholog); Top expressed in: mucosa of transverse colon; right frontal lobe; right hemisphere of cerebellum; cingulate gyrus; anterior cingulate cortex; Brodmann area 9; caudate nucleus; amygdala; nucleus accumbens; putamen / Top expressed in: cerebellar cortex; Epithelium of choroid plexus; primary visual cortex; habenula; superior frontal gyrus; cerebellar vermis; lobe of cerebellum; facial motor nucleus; inferior colliculi; nucleus of stria terminalis; More reference expression data
BioGPS	n/a
Gene ontology
Molecular function	iron-sulfur cluster binding; oxidoreductase activity; metal ion binding; flavin adenine dinucleotide binding; 2 iron, 2 sulfur cluster binding
Cellular component	mitochondrial inner membrane; endoplasmic reticulum; mitochondrion; nucleus; cytosol
Biological process	execution phase of apoptosis; apoptotic process
Sources:Amigo / QuickGO
Orthologs
Databases	NCBI: entry; OMA: entry
Species	Human	Mouse
Entrez	150209	72168
Ensembl	ENSG00000183773	ENSMUSG00000022763
UniProt	Q96NN9	Q3TY86
RefSeq (mRNA)	NM_001018060; NM_001146288; NM_144704; NM_001386814	NM_001291070; NM_175178
RefSeq (protein)	NP_001018070; NP_001139760; NP_653305	NP_001277999; NP_780387
Location (UCSC)	Chr 22: 20.97 – 20.98 Mb	Chr 16: 17.49 – 17.51 Mb
PubMed search
- Wikidata
View/Edit Human	View/Edit Mouse

Apoptosis-inducing factor, mitochondria-associated 3 is a protein that in humans is encoded by the AIFM3 gene.
