= Axin-2 =

Protein found in humans

AXIN2

Identifiers
- Aliases: AXIN2, AXIL, ODCRCS, axin 2
- External IDs: OMIM: 604025; MGI: 1270862; GeneCards: AXIN2

Gene location (Human)
Chr.	Chromosome 17 (human)
Band	17q24.1	Start	65,528,563 bp
Band	17q24.1	End	65,561,648 bp

Gene location (Mouse)
Chr.	Chromosome 11 (mouse)
Band	11 E1|11 71.83 cM	Start	108,811,175 bp
Band	11 E1|11 71.83 cM	End	108,841,609 bp
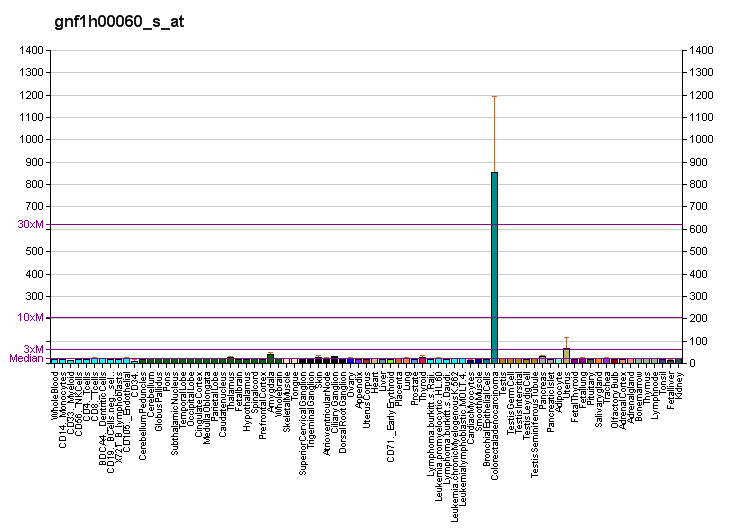

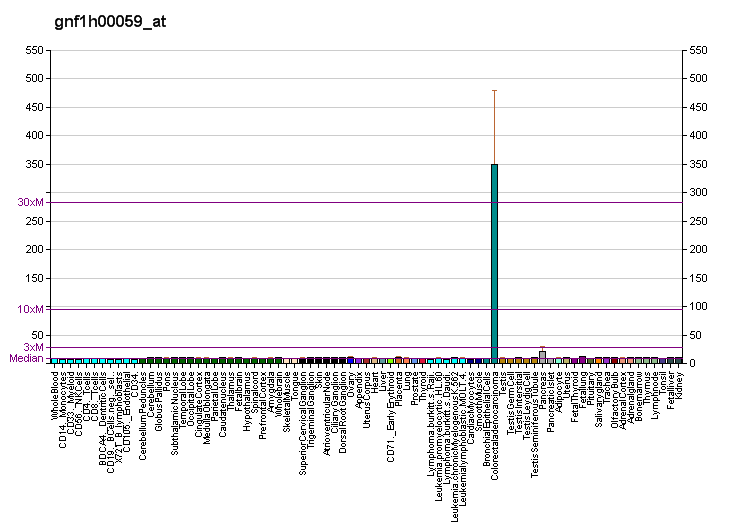
RNA expression pattern
Bgee	Human / Mouse (ortholog); Top expressed in: skin of arm; body of uterus; tibialis anterior muscle; thymus; germinal epithelium; right lung; mucosa of ileum; right uterine tube; cartilage tissue; gonad / Top expressed in: primitive streak; primary oocyte; pelvic part of vagina; prostatic epithelium; hair follicle; iris; Paneth cell; anterior lobe of prostate; lamina propria of urinary bladder; tail of embryo; More reference expression data
BioGPS	More reference expression data
Gene ontology
Molecular function	I-SMAD binding; GTPase activator activity; protein binding; enzyme binding; ubiquitin protein ligase binding; beta-catenin binding
Cellular component	cytoplasm; cytosol; centrosome; plasma membrane; nucleus; beta-catenin destruction complex
Biological process	regulation of mismatch repair; intramembranous ossification; somitogenesis; bone mineralization; positive regulation of protein phosphorylation; positive regulation of cell death; regulation of centromeric sister chromatid cohesion; positive regulation of canonical Wnt signaling pathway; positive regulation of epithelial to mesenchymal transition; negative regulation of osteoblast differentiation; odontogenesis; multicellular organism development; mRNA stabilization; maintenance of DNA repeat elements; regulation of Wnt signaling pathway; chondrocyte differentiation involved in endochondral bone morphogenesis; regulation of chondrocyte development; secondary heart field specification; cell population proliferation; negative regulation of canonical Wnt signaling pathway; negative regulation of cell population proliferation; positive regulation of GTPase activity; beta-catenin-TCF complex assembly; Wnt signaling pathway
Sources:Amigo / QuickGO
Orthologs
Databases	NCBI: entry; OMA: entry
Species	Human	Mouse
Entrez	8313	12006
Ensembl	ENSG00000168646	ENSMUSG00000000142
UniProt	Q9Y2T1	O88566
RefSeq (mRNA)	NM_004655; NM_001363813	NM_015732
RefSeq (protein)	NP_004646; NP_001350742	NP_056547
Location (UCSC)	Chr 17: 65.53 – 65.56 Mb	Chr 11: 108.81 – 108.84 Mb
PubMed search
- Wikidata
View/Edit Human	View/Edit Mouse

Axin-2, also known as axin-like protein (Axil), axis inhibition protein 2 (AXIN2), or conductin, is a protein that in humans is encoded by the AXIN2 gene.

== Function ==
The Axin-related protein, Axin2, presumably plays an important role in the regulation of the stability of beta-catenin in the Wnt signaling pathway, like its rodent homologs, mouse conductin/rat axil. In mouse, conductin organizes a multiprotein complex of APC (adenomatous polyposis of the colon), beta-catenin, glycogen synthase kinase 3-beta, and conductin, which leads to the degradation of beta-catenin. The AXIN proteins attract substantial interest in cancer research as AXIN1 and AXIN2 work synergistically to control pro-oncogenic β-catenin signaling. Importantly, activity in the β-catenin destruction complex can be increased by tankyrase inhibitors and are a potential therapeutic option to reduce the growth of β-catenin-dependent cancers.

== Clinical significance ==
The deregulation of beta-catenin is an important event in the genesis of a number of malignancies. The AXIN2 gene has been mapped to 17q23-q24, a region that shows frequent loss of heterozygosity in breast cancer, neuroblastoma, and other tumors. Mutations in this gene have been associated with colorectal cancer with defective mismatch repair.

The most critical events of teeth, lip and palate formation occur almost concurrently. Hypodontia, defined as the congenital lack of one or more permanent teeth, is the most common dental abnormality found in humans and affects approximately 20% of the population worldwide. AXIS inhibition protein 2 (AXIN2) gene polymorphic variants may be associated with both hypodontia and oligodontia (characterized by the lack of six or more permanent teeth). Mutations of this gene have been found in individuals with colorectal carcinomas and liver tumors.

An AXIN2 mutation (1966C>T) detected in a Finnish family was associated with both tooth agenesis and colon neoplasia. A second family is described from Michigan in 2011, with members describing severe oligodontia, sparse hair, and hundreds of colons polyps. Another family was found by the Mayo Clinic in 2019. In essence, the mutation seems to disrupt tooth development early in life and later contributes to the emergence of polyps and eventually colon cancer, an observation that suggests that the lack of permanent teeth may be an indicator of colon cancer susceptibility. Dentists may at the very least need to remain aware of the possible association, to be able to detect such cases of tooth agenesis and forward the patient to more complete genetic diagnostic examinations. This is a simple example of how molecular genetic discoveries today interact with traditional disciplines (Longtin, 2004).

== Interactions ==
AXIN2 has been shown to interact with GSK3B.
