= Telomeric repeat-binding factor 1 =

Protein-coding gene in humans

TERF1
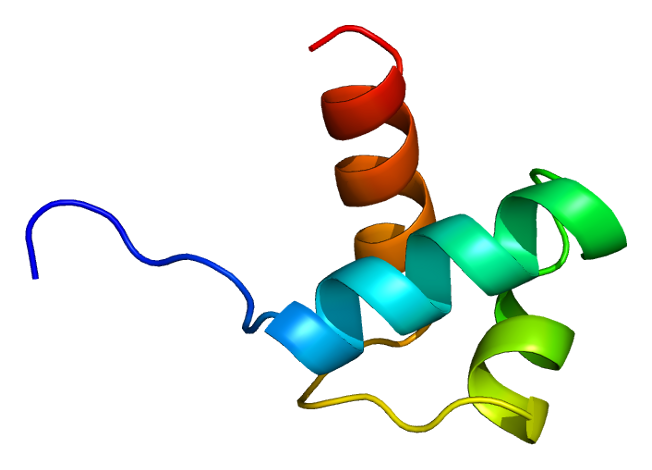

Identifiers
- Aliases: TERF1, PIN2, TRBF1, TRF, TRF1, hTRF1-AS, t-TRF1, telomeric repeat binding factor 1
- External IDs: OMIM: 600951; MGI: 109634; GeneCards: TERF1
Available structures
PDB	Ortholog search: PDBe RCSB
PDB	List of PDB id codes 1BA5, 1ITY, 1IV6, 1W0T, 3BQO, 3L82, 5HKP

Gene location (Human)
Chr.	Chromosome 8 (human)
Band	8q21.11	Start	73,008,856 bp
Band	8q21.11	End	73,048,123 bp

Gene location (Mouse)
Chr.	Chromosome 1 (mouse)
Band	1 A3|1 4.88 cM	Start	15,875,870 bp
Band	1 A3|1 4.88 cM	End	15,914,276 bp
RNA expression pattern
Bgee	Human / Mouse (ortholog); Top expressed in: buccal mucosa cell; sural nerve; spinal ganglia; tail of epididymis; pars reticulata; germinal epithelium; seminal vesicula; ventricular zone; trigeminal ganglion; pars compacta / Top expressed in: yolk sac; tail of embryo; zygote; morula; epiblast; embryo; genital tubercle; blastocyst; maxillary prominence; primary oocyte; More reference expression data
BioGPS	n/a
Gene ontology
Molecular function	DNA binding; double-stranded telomeric DNA binding; protein homodimerization activity; telomeric DNA binding; microtubule binding; telomerase activity; ubiquitin binding; protein binding; G-rich strand telomeric DNA binding; protein heterodimerization activity; DNA binding, bending; ankyrin repeat binding; protein C-terminus binding; DNA-binding transcription factor activity, RNA polymerase II-specific
Cellular component	cytoplasm; nuclear telomere cap complex; spindle; nucleoplasm; chromosome; telomere; nucleolus; cytoskeleton; nucleus; fibrillar center; nuclear body; shelterin complex
Biological process	telomere maintenance via telomerase; negative regulation of establishment of RNA localization to telomere; negative regulation of telomere maintenance via semi-conservative replication; meiotic telomere clustering; negative regulation of establishment of protein localization to telomere; negative regulation of telomerase activity; negative regulation of DNA replication; positive regulation of mitotic cell cycle; mitotic spindle assembly checkpoint signaling; cell division; positive regulation of shelterin complex assembly; G2/M transition of mitotic cell cycle; positive regulation of apoptotic process; positive regulation of microtubule polymerization; negative regulation of establishment of protein-containing complex localization to telomere; cell cycle; protein homooligomerization; positive regulation of mitotic nuclear division; telomeric loop formation; telomere capping; negative regulation of exonuclease activity; telomeric D-loop disassembly; t-circle formation; negative regulation of telomeric D-loop disassembly; negative regulation of telomere maintenance via telomerase; negative regulation of telomere maintenance via telomere lengthening; telomere maintenance; regulation of transcription by RNA polymerase II
Sources:Amigo / QuickGO
Orthologs
Databases	NCBI: entry; OMA: entry
Species	Human	Mouse
Entrez	7013	21749
Ensembl	ENSG00000147601	ENSMUSG00000025925
UniProt	P54274	P70371
RefSeq (mRNA)	NM_003218; NM_017489	NM_001286628; NM_009352
RefSeq (protein)	NP_003209; NP_059523	NP_001273557; NP_033378
Location (UCSC)	Chr 8: 73.01 – 73.05 Mb	Chr 1: 15.88 – 15.91 Mb
PubMed search
- Wikidata
View/Edit Human	View/Edit Mouse

Telomeric repeat-binding factor 1 is a protein that in humans is encoded by the TERF1 gene.

== Gene ==
The human TERF1 gene is located in the chromosome 8 at 73,921,097-73,960,357 bp. Two transcripts of this gene are alternatively spliced products. The TERF1 gene is also known as TRF, PIN2 (Proteinase Inhibitor 2), TRF1, t-TRF1 and h-TRF1-AS.

== Protein ==
The protein structure contains a C-terminal Myb motif, a dimerization domain (TERF homology) near its N-terminus and an acidic N-terminus.

== Subcellular distribution ==
The cellular distribution of this DNA binding protein features the nucleoplasm, chromosomes, a telomeric region, a nuclear telomere cap complex, the cytoplasm, the spindle, the nucleus and a nucleolus and a nuclear chromosome.

== Function ==
TERF 1 gene encodes a telomere specific protein which is a component of the telomere's shelterin nucleoprotein complex. This protein is present at telomeres throughout the cell cycle and functions as an inhibitor of telomerase, acting in cis to limit the elongation of individual chromosome ends. It is known to protect telomeres in mammals from DNA mechanisms that are used for repair purposes and at the same time regulate the activity carried out by telomerase. The telomeric repeat binding factor 1 protein is present at telomeres, where the cells aging aspect is monitored, throughout the typical cell cycle process. The progressive loss of the telomeric ends of chromosomes is an important mechanism in the timing of human cellular aging. Telomeric Repeat Factor 1 (TRF1) is a protein that binds at telomere ends.

The protein has the ultimate use of functioning as an inhibitor of telomerase, a protein enzyme that assists in the elongation of chromosomes by the addition of sequences of TTAGGG to the end of the chromosomes. The protein acts as cis-regulatory elements in the process of limiting the ends of individual chromosomes from elongating as facilitated by telomerase and the TTAGGG sequences. The structure of the protein consists of a dimerization domain close to its amino terminus, a carboxyl terminal tail, which is the free carboxyl group that terminates the end of a protein chain and an acidic amino terminus, which is the free amine group that terminates the start of a protein.

== Biological processes ==
The protein is also actively involved in biological processes such as those relating to drug absorption as well as the negative regulation of the maintenance of telomere through the process of semi-conservative replication, similar to that of cis. In addition, according to Kaplan and Christopher, the protein is also involved in the biological processes of positive regulation of the polymerization of the microtubule and negative control of the process of DNA replication. This protein is also useful in the biological process of mitosis and the positive regulation of mitosis. It positively regulates the mitotic cell cycle. The protein encoded by the TERF 1 gene is also involved in the biological process of cell division and the negative regulation of the maintenance of telomere facilitated by the enzyme telomerase.

Other than functioning as an inhibitor of the enzyme telomerase in the process of elongation of the ends of chromosomes, the protein has other functions. These functions include the binding of the protein, facilitation in the activity of protein homodimerization, the binding of DNA and facilitation in the activity of protein heterodimerization as well as the binding of the microtubule. Additionally, the protein has a molecular function of binding telomeric DNA and the double-stranded telomeric DNA. The telomeric repeat-binding factor 1 protein is also used in the binding of chromatin and the whole activity of bending of the DNA.

== Clinical significance ==
TERF1 protein levels correlates with telomere length in colorectal cancer. Telomeres protect the chromosome from degradation by nucleases and end-to-end fusion. The progressive loss of the telomeric ends of chromosomes is an important mechanism in the timing of human cellular aging. Telomeric Repeat Factor 1 (TRF1) is a protein that binds at telomere ends. To measure the concentrations of TRF1 and the relationships among telomere length, telomerase activity, and TRF1 levels in tumor and normal colorectal mucosa, from normal and tumoral samples of patients who underwent surgery for colorectal cancer we analyzed TRF1 protein concentration, and telomerase activity were analysed. As result high levels of TRF1 were observed in 68.7% of tumor samples, while the majority of normal samples showed negative or weak TRF1 concentrations. Among the tumor samples, telomere length was significantly associated with TRF1 protein levels. In conclusion a relationship exists between telomere length and TRF1 abundance protein in tumor samples, which means that TRF1 is an important factor in the tumor progression and maybe a diagnostic factor.

== Interactions ==
The TERF1 encoded protein has been shown to have interactions with the following; SALL1 (Sal-like1- Drosophila, a protein.), ABL (Abelson murine leukemia viral oncogene homolog, a protein), MAPRE2 (Microtubule-associated protein RP/EB, a protein), ATM (Ataxia telangiectasia mutated, a protein kinase), PINX1 (TERF1-interacting telomerase inhibitor 1), TINF2 (TERF1-interacting telomerase nuclear factor), TNKS2 (Tankyrase, an enzyme) and NME1 (nucleoside diphosphate kinase).In conclusion, as mentioned above, the telomeric repeat-binding factor 1 protein has most of its functions related to the binding of components and regulation of processes.

TERF1 has been shown to interact with:

- Abl gene,
- Ataxia telangiectasia mutated,
- MAPRE1,
- NME1,
- PINX1
- SALL1,
- TINF2,
- TNKS2, and
- TNKS.
