= PARP12 =

Protein-coding gene in the species Homo sapiens

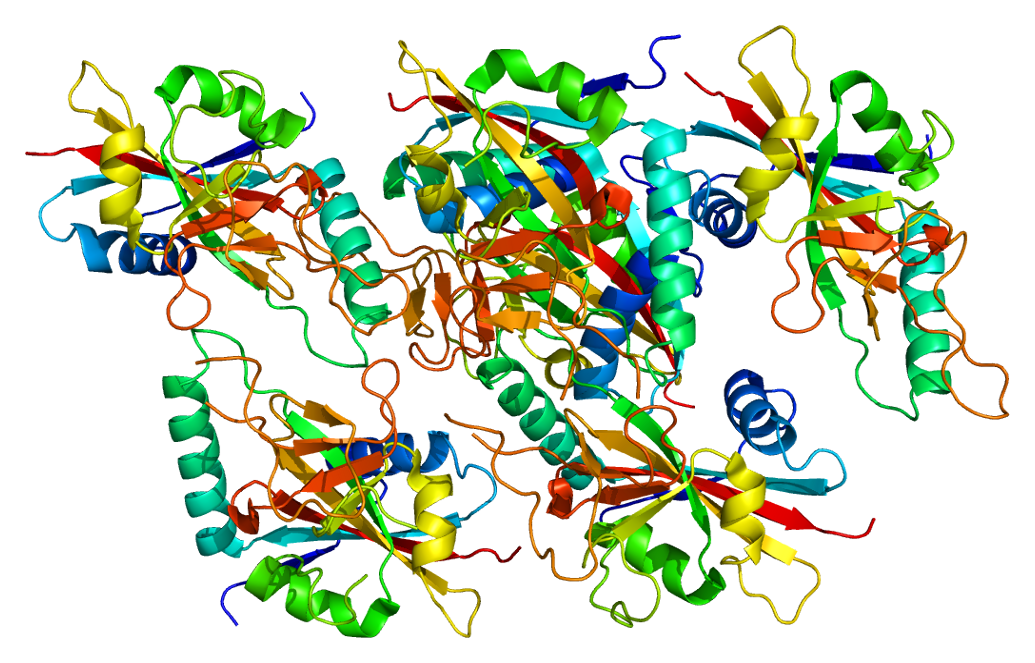

Identifiers
- Aliases: PARP12, ARTD12, MST109, MSTP109, ZC3H1, ZC3HDC1, poly(ADP-ribose) polymerase family member 12
- External IDs: OMIM: 612481; MGI: 2143990; GeneCards: PARP12
Available structures
PDB	Ortholog search: PDBe RCSB
PDB	List of PDB id codes 2PQF

Gene location (Human)
Chr.	Chromosome 7 (human)
Band	7q34	Start	140,023,749 bp
Band	7q34	End	140,062,951 bp

Gene location (Mouse)
Chr.	Chromosome 6 (mouse)
Band	6|6 B1	Start	39,063,344 bp
Band	6|6 B1	End	39,095,283 bp
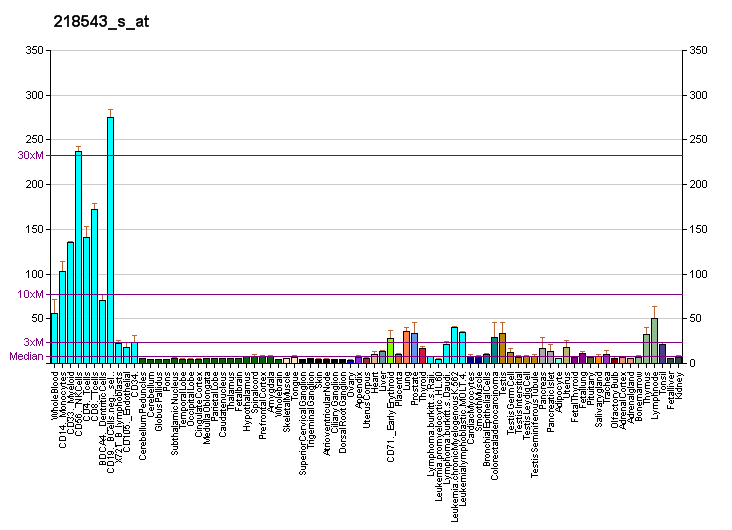
RNA expression pattern
Bgee	Human / Mouse (ortholog); Top expressed in: secondary oocyte; granulocyte; right lung; upper lobe of left lung; monocyte; spleen; mucosa of ileum; mucosa of transverse colon; rectum; tibial nerve / Top expressed in: zygote; secondary oocyte; primary oocyte; intestinal villus; stroma of bone marrow; pineal gland; mucous cell of stomach; left colon; jejunum; ileum; More reference expression data
BioGPS	More reference expression data
Gene ontology
Molecular function	NAD+ ADP-ribosyltransferase activity; metal ion binding; transferase activity; RNA binding; protein ADP-ribosylase activity
Cellular component	nucleus
Biological process	protein auto-ADP-ribosylation; protein mono-ADP-ribosylation
Sources:Amigo / QuickGO
Orthologs
Databases	NCBI: entry; OMA: entry
Species	Human	Mouse
Entrez	64761	243771
Ensembl	ENSG00000059378	ENSMUSG00000038507
UniProt	Q9H0J9	Q8BZ20
RefSeq (mRNA)	NM_022750	NM_172893
RefSeq (protein)	NP_073587	NP_766481
Location (UCSC)	Chr 7: 140.02 – 140.06 Mb	Chr 6: 39.06 – 39.1 Mb
PubMed search
- Wikidata
View/Edit Human	View/Edit Mouse

Poly [ADP-ribose] polymerase 12 is an enzyme that in humans is encoded by the PARP12 gene.
