= PARP8 =

Protein-coding gene in the species Homo sapiens

Identifiers
- Aliases: PARP8, ARTD16, pART16, poly(ADP-ribose) polymerase family member 8
- External IDs: MGI: 1098713; GeneCards: PARP8

Gene location (Human)
Chr.	Chromosome 5 (human)
Band	5q11.1	Start	50,665,899 bp
Band	5q11.1	End	50,846,519 bp

Gene location (Mouse)
Chr.	Chromosome 13 (mouse)
Band	13 D2.3|13 65.32 cM	Start	116,991,356 bp
Band	13 D2.3|13 65.32 cM	End	117,162,073 bp
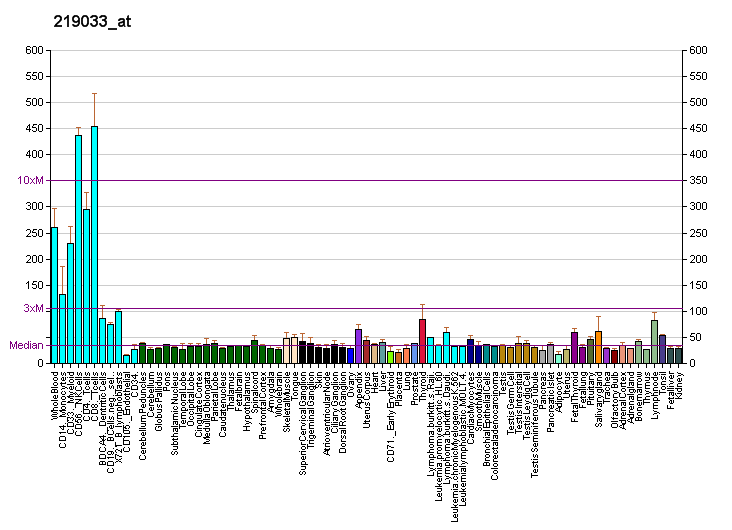
RNA expression pattern
Bgee	Human / Mouse (ortholog); Top expressed in: granulocyte; monocyte; blood; spleen; left lobe of thyroid gland; bone marrow cell; right lobe of thyroid gland; gallbladder; right uterine tube; epithelium of colon / Top expressed in: morula; morula; granulocyte; tail of embryo; intervertebral disc; islet of Langerhans; spermatid; zygote; genital tubercle; secondary oocyte; More reference expression data
BioGPS	More reference expression data
Gene ontology
Molecular function	glycosyltransferase activity; NAD+ ADP-ribosyltransferase activity; transferase activity; protein ADP-ribosylase activity
Cellular component	intracellular anatomical structure
Biological process	metabolism; protein ADP-ribosylation; protein auto-ADP-ribosylation; protein mono-ADP-ribosylation
Sources:Amigo / QuickGO
Orthologs
Databases	NCBI: entry; OMA: entry
Species	Human	Mouse
Entrez	79668	52552
Ensembl	ENSG00000151883	ENSMUSG00000021725
UniProt	Q8N3A8	Q3UD82
RefSeq (mRNA)	NM_001178055; NM_001178056; NM_024615; NM_001331028	NM_001081009; NM_027272
RefSeq (protein)	NP_001171526; NP_001171527; NP_001317957; NP_078891	NP_001074478
Location (UCSC)	Chr 5: 50.67 – 50.85 Mb	Chr 13: 116.99 – 117.16 Mb
PubMed search
- Wikidata
View/Edit Human	View/Edit Mouse

Poly [ADP-ribose] polymerase 8 is an enzyme that in humans is encoded by the PARP8 gene.
