= CNOT12 =

Protein-coding gene in humans

Identifiers
- Aliases: CNOT12, TAB182, tankyrase 1 binding protein 1, TNKS1BP1
- External IDs: OMIM: 607104; MGI: 2446193; GeneCards: CNOT12

Gene location (Human)
Chr.	Chromosome 11 (human)
Band	11q12.1	Start	57,299,638 bp
Band	11q12.1	End	57,324,952 bp

Gene location (Mouse)
Chr.	Chromosome 2 (mouse)
Band	2|2 D	Start	84,878,366 bp
Band	2|2 D	End	84,903,392 bp
RNA expression pattern
Bgee	Human / Mouse (ortholog); Top expressed in: gastric mucosa; skin of abdomen; skin of leg; ectocervix; canal of the cervix; body of stomach; minor salivary glands; right coronary artery; right lobe of liver; upper lobe of left lung / Top expressed in: lip; ankle joint; dentate gyrus of hippocampal formation granule cell; esophagus; gastrula; corneal stroma; stomach; primary visual cortex; lacrimal gland; lactiferous gland; More reference expression data
BioGPS	n/a
Gene ontology
Molecular function	protein binding; enzyme binding; ankyrin repeat binding; cadherin binding; protein-containing complex binding
Cellular component	chromosome; CCR4-NOT complex; cytosol; cytoskeleton; nucleus; cytoplasm
Biological process	nuclear-transcribed mRNA poly(A) tail shortening; telomere maintenance via telomerase; DNA damage response, signal transduction by p53 class mediator resulting in cell cycle arrest; double-strand break repair; positive regulation of peptidyl-threonine phosphorylation; positive regulation of protein autophosphorylation; positive regulation of peptidyl-serine phosphorylation; cellular response to ionizing radiation
Sources:Amigo / QuickGO
Orthologs
Databases	NCBI: entry; OMA: entry
Species	Human	Mouse
Entrez	85456	228140
Ensembl	ENSG00000149115	ENSMUSG00000033955
UniProt	Q9C0C2	P58871
RefSeq (mRNA)	NM_033396	NM_001081260
RefSeq (protein)	NP_203754	NP_001074729
Location (UCSC)	Chr 11: 57.3 – 57.32 Mb	Chr 2: 84.88 – 84.9 Mb
PubMed search
- Wikidata
View/Edit Human	View/Edit Mouse

CCR4-NOT transcription complex subunit 12 is an protein that in humans is encoded by the CNOT12 gene (previously TNKS1BP1). This protein is part of the CCR4-NOT complex.

== Interactions ==
TNKS1BP1 has been shown to interact with TNKS.
