= RNF146 =

Protein-coding gene in the species Homo sapiens

Rnf146

Identifiers
- Aliases: 2610509H23RikIdunaring finger protein 146
- External IDs: GeneCards:
Available structures
PDB	Human UniProt search: PDBe RCSB
PDB	List of PDB id codes 1UJR, 2RSF, 4QPL

Gene location (Human)
Chr.	Chromosome 10 (human)
Band	10|10 A4	Start	29,220,172 bp
Band	10|10 A4	End	29,238,438 bp
RNA expression pattern
Bgee	Human / Mouse (ortholog); Top expressed in: interventricular septum; motor neuron; Region I of hippocampus proper; cumulus cell; superior cervical ganglion; vestibular sensory epithelium; primitive streak; trigeminal ganglion; vestibular membrane of cochlear duct; medial ganglionic eminence / n/a; More reference expression data
BioGPS	n/a
Gene ontology
Molecular function	zinc ion binding; poly-ADP-D-ribose binding; metal ion binding; ubiquitin-protein transferase activity; ubiquitin protein ligase activity; transferase activity; protein binding
Cellular component	cytoplasm; cytosol; nucleus; nucleoplasm; plasma membrane
Biological process	positive regulation of canonical Wnt signaling pathway; Wnt signaling pathway; protein K48-linked ubiquitination; protein ubiquitination; protein autoubiquitination; ubiquitin-dependent protein catabolic process; negative regulation of hydrogen peroxide-induced cell death
Sources:Amigo / QuickGO
Orthologs
Databases	NCBI: entry; OMA: entry
Species	Human	Mouse
Entrez	68031	n/a
Ensembl	ENSMUSG00000038876	n/a
UniProt	Q9CZW6	Q9CZW6
RefSeq (mRNA)	NM_001110196; NM_001110197; NM_001110198; NM_001284279; NM_026518	n/a
RefSeq (protein)	NP_001103666; NP_001103667; NP_001103668; NP_001271208; NP_080794	NP_001103666; NP_001103667; NP_001103668; NP_001271208; NP_080794
Location (UCSC)	Chr 10: 29.22 – 29.24 Mb	n/a
PubMed search		n/a
- Wikidata
View/Edit Human

RING finger protein 146 is a protein that in humans is encoded by the RNF146 gene.
