= Tankyrase 2 =

Protein-coding gene in the species Homo sapiens

TNKS2
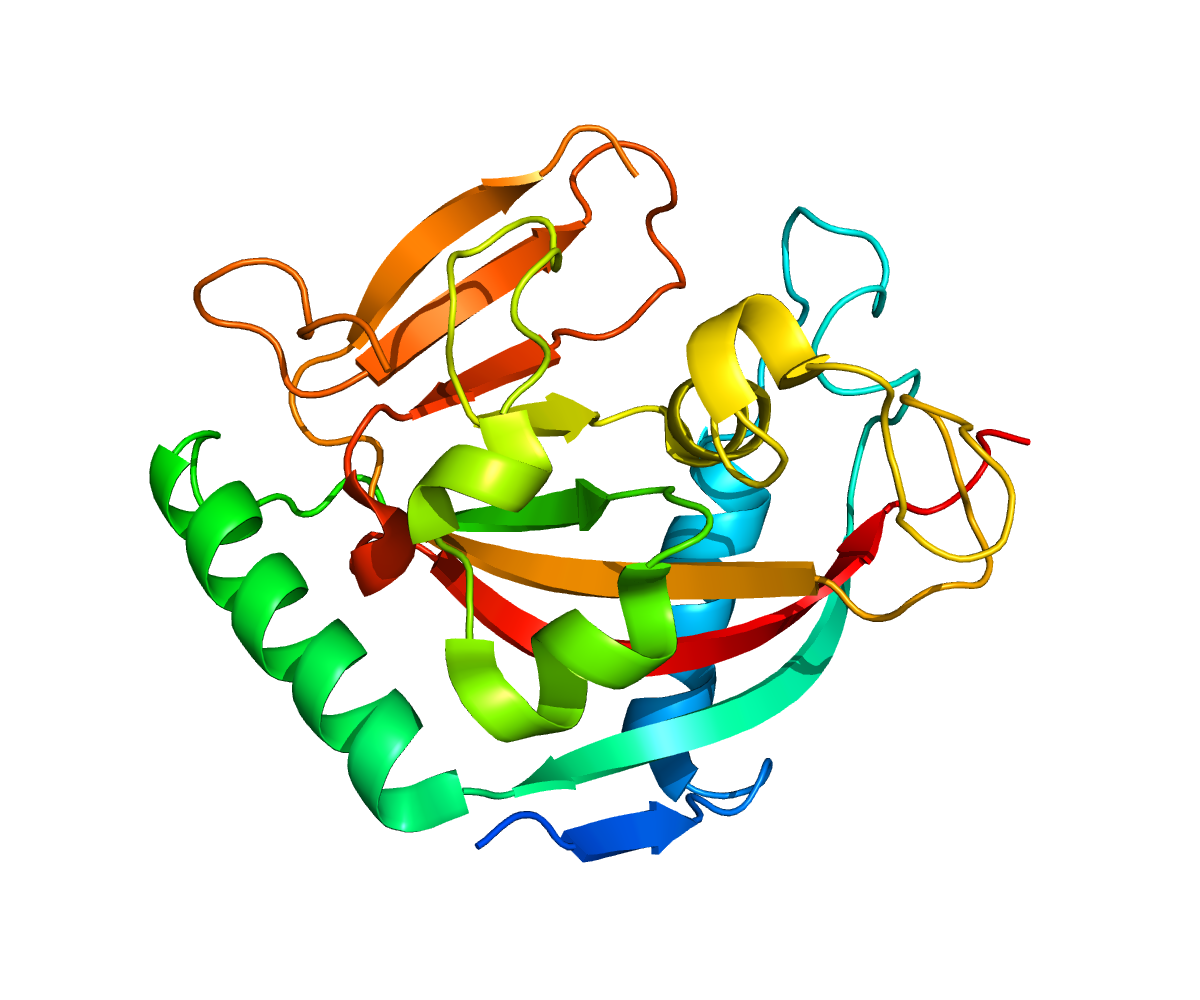

Identifiers
- Aliases: TNKS2, ARTD6, PARP-5b, PARP-5c, PARP5B, PARP5C, TANK2, TNKL, pART6, tankyrase 2
- External IDs: OMIM: 607128; MGI: 1921743; GeneCards: TNKS2
Available structures
PDB	Ortholog search: PDBe RCSB
PDB	List of PDB id codes 2Y0I, 3KR7, 3KR8, 3MHJ, 3MHK, 3P0N, 3P0P, 3P0Q, 3TWQ, 3TWR, 3TWS, 3TWT, 3TWU, 3TWV, 3TWW, 3TWX, 3U9H, 3U9Y, 3UA9, 3W51, 4AVU, 4AVW, 4BFP, 4BJ9, 4BJB, 4BJC, 4BS4, 4BU3, 4BU5, 4BU6, 4BU7, 4BU8, 4BU9, 4BUA, 4BUD, 4BUE, 4BUF, 4BUI, 4BUS, 4BUT, 4BUU, 4BUV, 4BUW, 4BUX, 4BUY, 4HKI, 4HKK, 4HKN, 4HL5, 4HLF, 4HLG, 4HLH, 4HLK, 4HLM, 4HMH, 4HYF, 4IUE, 4J1Z, 4J21, 4J22, 4J3L, 4J3M, 4KZL, 4KZQ, 4KZU, 4L09, 4L0B, 4L0I, 4L0S, 4L0T, 4L0V, 4L10, 4L2F, 4L2G, 4L2K, 4L31, 4L32, 4L33, 4L34, 4M7B, 4PML, 4PNL, 4PNM, 4PNN, 4PNQ, 4PNR, 4PNS, 4PNT, 4TJU, 4TJW, 4TJY, 4TK0, 4TK5, 4TKF, 4TKG, 4TKI, 4UVL, 4UVN, 4UVO, 4UVP, 4UVS, 4UVT, 4UVU, 4UVV, 4UVW, 4UVX, 4UVY, 4UVZ, 4UX4, 4W5I, 5AKU, 5AKW, 5AL1, 5AL2, 5AL3, 5AL4, 5AL5, 5C5P, 5C5Q, 5C5R, 5ADT, 5ADS, 5ADQ, 5AEH, 5ADR, 4Z68, 5BXU, 4UI5, 4UFY, 4UI7, 4UI3, 4UI4, 4UFU, 4UHG, 4UI6, 5BXO, 4UI8
Enzyme activity
EC #	BRENDA	ExPASy	KEGG	MetaCyc
2.4.2.30	↗	↗	↗	↗

Gene location (Human)
Chr.	Chromosome 10 (human)
Band	10q23.32	Start	91,798,426 bp
Band	10q23.32	End	91,865,475 bp

Gene location (Mouse)
Chr.	Chromosome 19 (mouse)
Band	19|19 C2	Start	36,811,632 bp
Band	19|19 C2	End	36,870,877 bp
RNA expression pattern
Bgee	Human / Mouse (ortholog); Top expressed in: Skeletal muscle tissue of rectus abdominis; Skeletal muscle tissue of biceps brachii; secondary oocyte; triceps brachii muscle; superior surface of tongue; Epithelium of choroid plexus; body of tongue; mucosa of pharynx; glutes; superficial temporal artery / Top expressed in: primitive streak; renal corpuscle; tail of embryo; aortic valve; genital tubercle; medullary collecting duct; ascending aorta; vestibular sensory epithelium; retinal pigment epithelium; urothelium; More reference expression data
BioGPS	n/a
Gene ontology
Molecular function	transferase activity; glycosyltransferase activity; metal ion binding; protein binding; enzyme binding; NAD+ ADP-ribosyltransferase activity; protein ADP-ribosylase activity
Cellular component	cytoplasm; cytosol; Golgi apparatus; pericentriolar material; nuclear envelope; membrane; Golgi membrane; chromosome; telomere; perinuclear region of cytoplasm; nucleus
Biological process	protein auto-ADP-ribosylation; protein ADP-ribosylation; positive regulation of telomere capping; multicellular organism growth; regulation of multicellular organism growth; positive regulation of canonical Wnt signaling pathway; protein polyubiquitination; positive regulation of telomere maintenance via telomerase; protein localization to chromosome, telomeric region; negative regulation of telomere maintenance via telomere lengthening; Wnt signaling pathway; protein poly-ADP-ribosylation
Sources:Amigo / QuickGO
Orthologs
Databases	NCBI: entry; OMA: entry
Species	Human	Mouse
Entrez	80351	74493
Ensembl	ENSG00000107854	ENSMUSG00000024811
UniProt	Q9H2K2	Q3UES3
RefSeq (mRNA)	NM_025235	NM_001163635
RefSeq (protein)	NP_079511	NP_001157107
Location (UCSC)	Chr 10: 91.8 – 91.87 Mb	Chr 19: 36.81 – 36.87 Mb
PubMed search
- Wikidata
View/Edit Human	View/Edit Mouse

Tankyrase-2 is an enzyme that in humans is encoded by the TNKS2 gene.

== Interactions ==
TNKS2 has been shown to interact with GRB14, TERF1 and Cystinyl aminopeptidase.
