= PARP10 =

Protein-coding gene in the species Homo sapiens

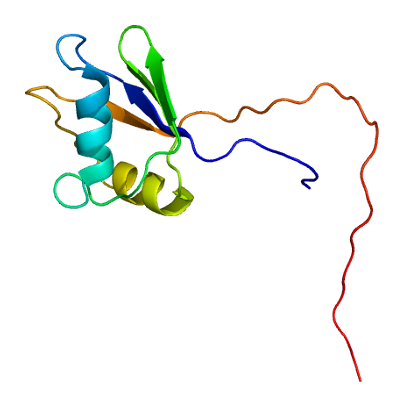

Identifiers
- Aliases: PARP10, ARTD10, poly(ADP-ribose) polymerase family member 10
- External IDs: OMIM: 609564; MGI: 3712326; GeneCards: PARP10
Available structures
PDB	Ortholog search: PDBe RCSB
PDB	List of PDB id codes 2DHX, 3HKV

Gene location (Human)
Chr.	Chromosome 8 (human)
Band	8q24.3	Start	143,977,153 bp
Band	8q24.3	End	144,012,772 bp

Gene location (Mouse)
Chr.	Chromosome 15 (mouse)
Band	15|15 D3	Start	76,115,374 bp
Band	15|15 D3	End	76,127,641 bp
RNA expression pattern
Bgee	Human / Mouse (ortholog); Top expressed in: granulocyte; pancreatic ductal cell; right uterine tube; spleen; appendix; lymph node; right testis; tendon of biceps brachii; left testis; right lobe of liver / Top expressed in: granulocyte; thymus; right kidney; mesenteric lymph nodes; duodenum; lip; spleen; proximal tubule; left lobe of liver; submandibular gland; More reference expression data
BioGPS	n/a
Gene ontology
Molecular function	transferase activity; K63-linked polyubiquitin modification-dependent protein binding; protein binding; glycosyltransferase activity; NAD+ ADP-ribosyltransferase activity; protein ADP-ribosylase activity
Cellular component	cytoplasm; nucleus; nucleolus; cytosol; intracellular membrane-bounded organelle
Biological process	negative regulation of protein K63-linked ubiquitination; protein auto-ADP-ribosylation; negative regulation of NF-kappaB transcription factor activity; protein ADP-ribosylation; negative regulation of fibroblast proliferation; negative regulation of gene expression; NAD biosynthesis via nicotinamide riboside salvage pathway; protein poly-ADP-ribosylation; translesion synthesis; protein mono-ADP-ribosylation; DNA repair; cellular response to DNA damage stimulus
Sources:Amigo / QuickGO
Orthologs
Databases	NCBI: entry; OMA: entry
Species	Human	Mouse
Entrez	84875	671535
Ensembl	ENSG00000178685	ENSMUSG00000063268
UniProt	Q53GL7	Q8CIE4
RefSeq (mRNA)	NM_032789; NM_001317895	NM_001163575; NM_001163576
RefSeq (protein)	NP_001304824; NP_116178	NP_001157047; NP_001157048
Location (UCSC)	Chr 8: 143.98 – 144.01 Mb	Chr 15: 76.12 – 76.13 Mb
PubMed search
- Wikidata
View/Edit Human	View/Edit Mouse

Poly [ADP-ribose] polymerase 10 is an enzyme that in humans is encoded by the PARP10 gene.

Poly(ADP-ribose) polymerases (PARPs), such as PARP10, regulate gene transcription by altering chromatin organization by adding ADP-ribose to histones. PARPs can also function as transcriptional cofactors (Yu et al., 2005).[supplied by OMIM]
