= PARG =

Protein-coding gene in the species Homo sapiens

Identifiers
- Aliases: PARG, PARG99, poly(ADP-ribose) glycohydrolase
- External IDs: OMIM: 603501; MGI: 1347094; GeneCards: PARG
Available structures
PDB	Ortholog search: PDBe RCSB
PDB	List of PDB id codes 4B1J, 5A7R, 4A0D, 4B1I, 4B1H, 4B1G
Enzyme activity
EC #	BRENDA	ExPASy	KEGG	MetaCyc
3.2.1.143	↗	↗	↗	↗

Gene location (Human)
Chr.	Chromosome 10 (human)
Band	10q11.23	Start	49,818,279 bp
Band	10q11.23	End	49,970,203 bp

Gene location (Mouse)
Chr.	Chromosome 14 (mouse)
Band	14|14 B	Start	31,923,906 bp
Band	14|14 B	End	32,019,507 bp
RNA expression pattern
Bgee	Human / Mouse (ortholog); Top expressed in: Achilles tendon; germinal epithelium; testicle; kidney tubule; ventricular zone; epithelium of nasopharynx; ganglionic eminence; corpus callosum; gingival epithelium; Skeletal muscle tissue of biceps brachii / Top expressed in: Gonadal ridge; primitive streak; stria vascularis; pineal gland; epiblast; ureter; morula; tail of embryo; morula; abdominal wall; More reference expression data
BioGPS	n/a
Gene ontology
Molecular function	hydrolase activity; poly(ADP-ribose) glycohydrolase activity; protein binding
Cellular component	mitochondrial matrix; intracellular membrane-bounded organelle; mitochondrion; nucleus; nucleoplasm; cytoplasm; cytosol
Biological process	ATP generation from poly-ADP-D-ribose; carbohydrate metabolic process; regulation of DNA repair; nucleotide-sugar metabolic process; cellular response to DNA damage stimulus
Sources:Amigo / QuickGO
Orthologs
Databases	NCBI: entry; OMA: entry
Species	Human	Mouse
Entrez	8505	26430
Ensembl	ENSG00000227345	ENSMUSG00000021911
UniProt	Q86W56	O88622
RefSeq (mRNA)	NM_001303486; NM_001303487; NM_001303489; NM_003631; NM_001324381	NM_011960; NM_001359915; NM_001374221
RefSeq (protein)	NP_001290415; NP_001290416; NP_001290418; NP_001311310; NP_003622	NP_036090; NP_001346844; NP_001361150
Location (UCSC)	Chr 10: 49.82 – 49.97 Mb	Chr 14: 31.92 – 32.02 Mb
PubMed search
- Wikidata
View/Edit Human	View/Edit Mouse

Poly (ADP-ribose) glycohydrolase is an enzyme that in humans is encoded by the PARG gene.

Poly (ADP-ribose) glycohydrolase (PARG) is the major enzyme responsible for the catabolism of poly (ADP-ribose), a reversible covalent-modifier of chromosomal proteins. The protein is found in many tissues and may be subject to proteolysis generating smaller, active products.
