= Telomeres in the cell cycle =

Biological theory of cellular aging

Telomeres, the caps on the ends of eukaryotic chromosomes, play critical roles in cellular aging and cancer. An important facet to how telomeres function in these roles is their involvement in cell cycle regulation.

== Eukaryotic cells ==
Because eukaryotic chromosomes are linear and because DNA replication by DNA polymerase requires the presence of an RNA primer that is later degraded, eukaryotic cells face the end-replication problem. This problem makes eukaryotic cells unable to copy the last few bases on the 3' end of the template DNA strand, leading to chromosome—and, therefore, telomere—shortening every S phase. Measurements of telomere lengths across cell types at various ages suggest that this gradual chromosome shortening results in a gradual reduction in telomere length at a rate of approximately 25 nucleotides per year.

== Cell cycle enablers and regulators ==
The telomere-shelterin complexes that cap all eukaryotic chromosomes ensure that healthy cells can progress through the cell cycle by preventing the cellular DNA damage response from identifying chromosome ends as double-stranded breaks (DSBs). Without a protective cap, chromosome ends would appear identical to intrachromosomal DSBs. These DSBs activate a DNA damage response pathway that halts the cell cycle until the breaks are repaired. This checkpoint pathway is initiated in S. cerevisiae by recruitment of protein kinases Mec1 and Tel1 and in mammals by recruitment of protein kinases ATR and ATM. Regarding DSB repair, eukaryotes generally use two strategies: non-homologous end joining (NHEJ), which involves rapid reattachment of the broken ends; and homologous recombination (HR), which involves the use of a homologous DNA sequence to repair the break. Because HR requires a homologous sequence, its use is restricted to S/G2 phase. (Interestingly, as with many other aspects of the cell cycle, cyclin-dependent kinases are responsible for downregulating NHEJ during S/G2 phase to ensure use of the more accurate HR.) As shown in Figure 1A, telomere-shelterin complexes contain motifs that inhibit the DNA damage checkpoint, NHEJ, and HR.

Initial work on the role of telomere-bound protein complexes in S. cerevisiae elucidated the mechanism by which these complexes prevent checkpoint activation and DSB repair of chromosome ends. The two major protein complexes that bind to telomeric DNA in S. cerevisiae are:

- the Cdc13-Stn1-Ten1 (CST) complex, which binds the single-stranded DNA (ssDNA) of the 3' G-rich overhang at the end of the telomere, and
- the Rif1-Rif2-Rap1 complex, which binds the double-stranded DNA (dsDNA) preceding the 3' overhang.

The CST complex and Rif1 prevent Mec1 recruitment, thereby preventing checkpoint activation. Meanwhile, Rif2 and Rap1 inhibit NHEJ: knocking out Rif2 or Rap1 results in longer telomeres as measured by PCR, indicating that NHEJ occurred. These knockout strains (unlike strains lacking functional CST or Rif1) continue to cycle, further suggesting that Rif2 and Rap1 are not involved in inhibiting checkpoint activation.

Analogously, proteins that bind to human telomeres as part of the shelterin complex enable cell cycle progress and prevent erroneous DSB repair. POT1 protein binds to ssDNA, prevents checkpoint activation through inhibiting ATR recruitment, and prevents HR; RAP1, a GTPase, binds to dsDNA and prevents HR; and TRF2 protein (also known as TERF2) binds to dsDNA, prevents checkpoint activation through inhibiting ATM recruitment, and prevents NHEJ. TRF2 is unique among these proteins in its role in the formation and maintenance of T-loops: lariat structures formed by the folding of the ssDNA overhang back onto the dsDNA. T-loops may further inhibit the binding of checkpoint activation proteins.

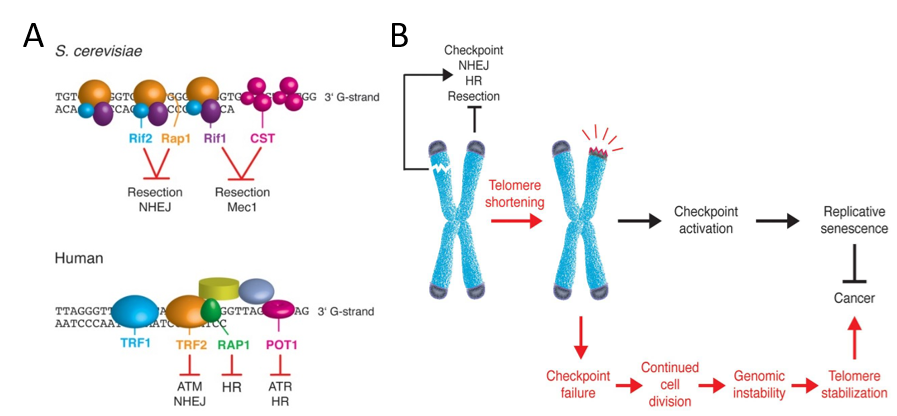
Figure 1. (A) Telomere-bound proteins involved in preventing the activation of the DNA damage response checkpoint and of DSB repair mechanisms in S. cerevisiae (top) and in humans (bottom). (B) Overview of the normal function of telomere-shelterin complexes and the pathways activated by telomere shortening.

As telomeres shorten as a natural consequence of repeated cell division or due to other factors, such as oxidative stress, shelterin proteins lose the ability to bind to telomeric DNA. When telomeres reach a critically short length, sufficient shelterin proteins to inhibit checkpoint activation are not available, although NHEJ and HR generally remain inhibited at this point. This loss of inhibition is one reason why telomere shortening causes senescence (Figure 1B).

== Telomeres and cell cycle deregulation ==
Almost all cancer cells have shortened telomeres. This may seem counter-intuitive, as short telomeres should activate the ATR/ATM DNA damage checkpoint and thereby prevent division. Resolving the question of why cancer cells have short telomeres led to the development of a two-stage model for how cancer cells subvert telomeric regulation of the cell cycle. First, the DNA damage checkpoint must be inactivated to allow cells to continue dividing even when telomeres pass the critical length threshold. This requirement follows not only from the discussion above but also from in vivo evidence showing the function of this checkpoint in precancerous lesions and its dysfunction in late-stage tumors. Second, to survive after disabling the DNA damage checkpoint, precancerous cells must activate mechanisms to extend their telomeres. As a result of the continued division past the point of normal senescence, the telomeres of these cells become too short to prevent NHEJ(Non Homologous End Joining) and HR(Homologous Recombination) of chromosome ends, causing a state known as crisis. The application of these DSB (double strand breaks)repair mechanisms to chromosome ends leads to genetic instability, and while this instability can promote carcinogenesis, it induces apoptosis if experienced for too long. To survive and replicate, precancerous cells must stabilize their telomere lengths. This occurs through telomerase activation or the activation of a telomere-recombination pathway (i.e., the ALT pathway). Thus, cancer cells have short telomeres because they progress through an intermediate stage of telomere shortening—caused by division after DNA damage checkpoint inactivation—before enabling mechanisms for maintaining telomere length.

Since the late 1990s, researchers have proposed using telomerase inhibitors as cancer treatments. While such inhibitors have been seriously considered for cancer therapy since the late 2000s, they are not commonly used. Two concerns with applying telomerase inhibitors in cancer treatment are that effective treatment requires continuous, long-term drug application and that off-target effects are common. For example, the telomerase inhibitor imetelstat, first proposed in 2003, has been held up in clinical trials due to hematological toxicity. Despite these concerns, the development of telomerase-based cancer treatments remains an active research area.

== Cell cycle timing of telomere elongation ==
Although telomerase activation does not occur during the cell cycle of normal somatic human cells, the association between telomere elongation (especially elongation by telomerase) and tumor development emphasizes the importance of understanding when such elongation can occur during the cell cycle. Work with S. cerevisiae has identified telomerase activity as restricted to late S phase. Researchers generated S. cerevisiae strains with galactose-inducible shortened telomeres. They then used α factor to block cells with induced short telomeres in late G1 phase and measured the change in telomere length when the cells were released under a variety of conditions. They found that when the cells were released and concurrently treated with nocodazole, a G2/M phase cell cycle inhibitor, telomere length increased for the first few hours and then remained constant. In comparison, when cells were released and allowed to cycle, telomere length increased linearly with time. These data suggest that telomere elongation occurs only in S phase. Additional experiments with greater time resolution support this hypothesis and narrow the timeframe to late S phase. Researchers tied telomere elongation in these experiments to telomerase activity by observing that in an S. cerevisiae strain with a dysfunctional ALT pathway telomere elongation still occurs.
