= Telomere-binding protein =

Protein that binds telomeric DNA in various species

Telomere-binding proteins (also known as TERF, TRBF, TRF) function to bind telomeric DNA in various species. In particular, telomere-binding protein refers to TTAGGG repeat binding factor-1 (TERF1) and TTAGGG repeat binding factor-2 (TERF2). Telomere sequences in humans are composed of TTAGGG sequences which provide protection and replication of chromosome ends to prevent degradation. Telomere-binding proteins can generate a T-loop to protect chromosome ends. TRFs are double-stranded proteins which are known to induce bending, looping, and pairing of DNA which aids in the formation of T-loops. They directly bind to TTAGGG repeat sequence in the DNA. There are also subtelomeric regions present for regulation. However, in humans, there are six subunits forming a complex known as shelterin.

== Structure ==
There are six subunits forming the telomere-binding protein complex known as shelterin: TERF1, TERF2, POT1, TIN2, RAP1 and TPP1. Both TERF1 and TERF2 bind the telomeric repeat sequences in the duplex region of the genome in vivo. The DNA-binding proteins include TERF1, TERF2, and POT1, which have specific sequences, altering binding affinity or regulatory mechanisms. TIN2, RAP1, TPP1 are adaptor proteins influencing signalling complexes.

Both TRFs are separate homodimer proteins, similar to the Myb helix-turn-helix motif with DNA binding folds at the C-terminus. There are highly conserved regions located in the centre with relation to the formation of homodimers. However, they differ in the N-terminus as TERF2 contains a basic motif while TERF1 is acidic so they do not dimerize. There is a 120˚ angular bend in TERF1 when binding to the telomeric site.

== Function ==
The complex recognizes the TTAGGG telomeric sequences, indicating the end of a chromosome. Telomere-binding proteins function to generate a T-loop, which is a specialized loop structure to cap the telomeric ends. Telomerase activity is regulated by protection of telomeres 1 (POT1). They serve as a protective safeguard against premature degradation as the telomere ends are no longer hidden from damage detection. Telomere-binding proteins not present may cause the exposed telomeres to undergo a DNA repair response, having mistakenly identified the ends as a double-stranded break. This is due to the 3’ overhang, which gradually shortens over time. A process known as uncapping occurs, in which the shelterin complex dissociates from the telomere when shrunk to a critical length.

=== TERF1 ===
TERF1 is present during all stages of the cell cycle, acting as a negative regulator in tandem with TERF2 while in contrast to telomerase. Its main function seems to be observed in controlling the telomere lengths via inhibition of telomerase. Removal of TERF1 will therefore lead to an increase in telomere length. TERF1 may reduce the accessibility of telomerase towards the end of the DNA length, which results in its inhibition. There may be potential post-translation modifications of TERF1 by adding ribose to induce regulation of telomerase. After the lengthening of the telomere, TERF1 reassembles to form an inaccessible T-loop structure.

It has homology to the Myb transcription factors as the protein-DNA complex requires both Myb repeats. TERF1 binds near the N-terminus on a highly conserved domain to form a homodimer interaction. Since TERF1 bends the telomeric site, it may be a critical step in properly functioning telomeres to maintain its length. TERF1 also serves to prevent problematic secondary structures from hindering progression by interacting with helicase for unobstructed unwinding.

=== TERF2 ===
TERF2 is a homolog to TERF1, exhibiting many functional and biochemical similarities. TERF2, like TERF1 has some relation to the Myb DNA binding motif. It serves as a secondary negative regulator, as overexpression of TERF2 produces a shortened telomere. TERF2 may also conceal the ends of the telomere in order to prevent detection from degradation. There is more conservation across species in TERF2 possibly due to higher risk of senescence when mutated.

TERF2 binds directly to the DNA sequence, forming a T-loop structure. Therefore, TERF2 plays a role in inducing loop formation by folding the 3’ TTAGGG sequence back into the duplex sequence. When removed, degradation of telomeric 3’ overhangs can be observed. However, this requires the work of excision repair exonuclease ERCC1/XPF so inhibition of TERF2 alone may not necessarily lead to immediate shortening. Upon deletion of TERF2, there is co-localization with TERF1 with the association of DNA damage response factors. Under regular cell conditions, TERF2 is known to suppress the ATM pathway, however, the mechanisms of which, are currently unclear.

== Interactions ==
=== Shelterin complex subunits ===
TERF1 and TERF2 have particular roles known to be associated with other subunits within the shelterin complex. They interact with TIN2 to recruit TPP1 binding by allowing TIN2 to form a bridge. As a result, a cascade of interactions follows by recruiting POT1 and RAP1 and the shelterin complex is complete to protect and regulate the telomeric ends.

TERF2 requires stabilization for proper functioning through the interaction of TERF1 and TIN2. This suggests that a deficiency in either of the three former proteins will lead to a dysfunctional cell. Despite being a negative regulator of telomerase, there are currently no known effects of TRFs on expression of telomerase.

=== Damage response factors ===
When TERF2 is absent or non-functioning, ATM kinase is activated at chromosome ends to trigger a DNA damage response, similar to a response to a double-stranded break. This will then recruit damage response factors such as H2AFX and 53BP1 when telomeres are shortened and deprotected. Upon activation of ATM kinase, p53 is triggered to induce cell cycle arrest and initiate apoptosis. As well, damage detection will mediate non-homologous end joining (NHEJ), producing an end-to-end fusion of double-stranded breaks. However, it is not yet known how telomeres can detect the presence of damage.

=== NER pathway ===
TERF2 also has implications in the nucleotide excision repair (NER) pathway based on experiments on K5-Terf2 mice. It is suggested that individuals with critically short telomeres are more prone to skin cancer via UV-exposure. As a result, TERF2, with roles in telomere-length controls, may affect UV-damage repair. For example, XPF nuclease, a component of NER, localizes to telomeres when the damage repair response is triggered. The presence of TERF2 then initiates XPF activity leading to the excision of telomeric ends causing a reduction in length.

== Clinical implications ==
=== Skin tumours ===
TERF2 may play a role in cancers as their expression has been shown to increase in human tumours. A study of tumours performed on mice induced overexpression of TERF2 in the skin. When exposed to light, notable observations showed hyperpigmentation and skin tumour similar to human syndrome xeroderma pigmentosum. They found significantly shortened telomeres with increased instability of the overall chromosome when analyzing cells. Telomere shortening was attributed to XPF, an excision repair nuclease, with link to TERF2 causing genomic instability.

=== Oral cancer ===
Oral cancer also has a link to telomere-binding proteins, with TERF2 in particular. The overexpression of TERF2 has been a notable similarity across patients with oral malignancies in humans. Similar to UV-damaged cells, there was an overall genomic instability leading to uncapping of the telomeric ends. The imbalance of TERF2 and telomerase have significant implications in cancer-inducing mechanisms. By targeting the telomere-binding proteins which serve to protect the ends, it may prove fruitful in future drug therapy.
