= Pierre Gönczy =

Swiss-Italian cell biologist

Full Professor Pierre Gönczy
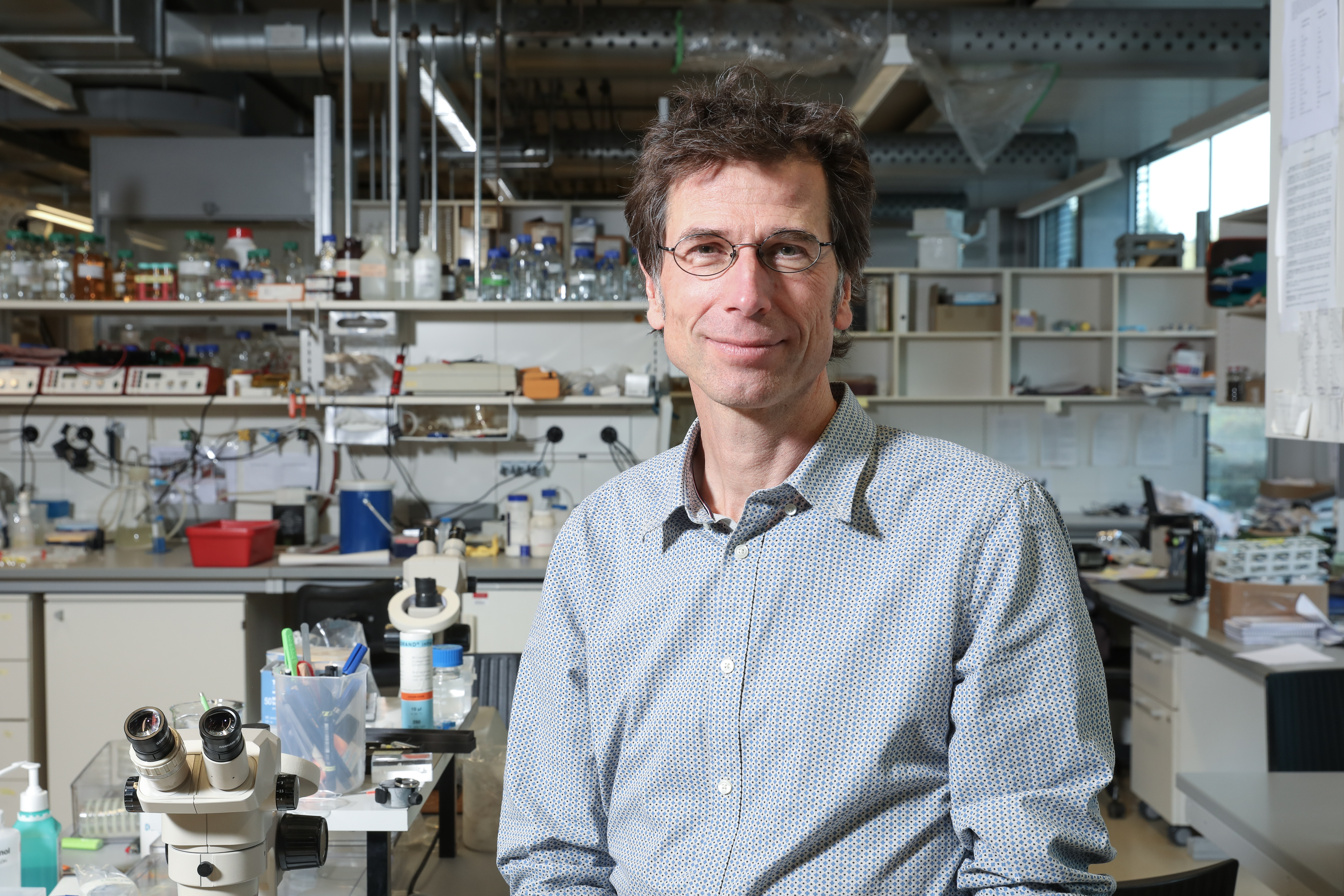
- Pierre Gönczy in his laboratory in 2020
- Born: 1962 (age 63–64); Winterthur, Switzerland
- Citizenship: Switzerland

Academic background
- Education: University of Geneva

Academic work
- Discipline: Biology
- Sub-discipline: Cell biology Developmental biology
- Institutions: École Polytechnique Fédérale de Lausanne (EPFL)
- Main interests: Centriole assembly and function Asymmetric cell division
- Website: https://www.epfl.ch/labs/gonczy-lab/

Pierre Gönczy (born 1962 in Winterthur, Switzerland) is a Swiss and Italian cell and developmental biologist. His research focuses on centriole biology and asymmetric cell division. He is currently professor at École Polytechnique Fédérale de Lausanne (EPFL), where he directs the Laboratory of Cell and Developmental Biology.

== Career ==
Gönczy studied biology at University of Geneva and graduated in 1987 with a diploma thesis in molecular immunology at the Department of Microbiology at University of Geneva. In 1995, he received a PhD for his work on developmental biology and molecular genetics from the Rockefeller University, New York City, United States. From 1996 to 2000 Gönczy joined the European Molecular Biology Laboratory (EMBL) in Heidelberg, Germany as a postdoctoral research fellow with Anthony Hyman to work on cell biology, cell division, and early embryonic development. In 2000, he became Junior Group leader at Swiss Institute for Experimental Cancer Research (ISREC) in Lausanne, Switzerland. In 2005, he was first nominated Associate Professor, and since 2009 has been a Full Professor at École Polytechnique Fédérale de Lausanne (EPFL).

== Research ==
Gönczy's research is in the realm of cell and developmental biology, focused mainly on the questions of centriole assembly and function, as well as asymmetric cell division. His laboratory employs notably the model organism C. elegans and human cell lines in their research. The methods they use include functional genomics, cell biology, live imaging, super-resolution microscopy, biophysical analysis, and electron cryotomography. He spearheaded the first ever functional genomic screening of a metazoan organism, leading to the systematic discovery of the function of the compendium of genes needed to build an embryo.

== Distinctions ==
Gönczy is recipient of the EMBO Young Investigator Program Award (2000). In 2005, he was elected an EMBO member. He was co-founder of the startup company Cenix Bioscience. He was a Whitman Fellow at the Marine Biology Laboratory, Woods Hole, USA in 2015, 2017, and 2018.

== Select publications ==
- Gönczy, Pierre; Echeverri, Christophe; Oegema, Karen; Coulson, Alan; Jones, Steven J. M.; Copley, Richard R.; Duperon, John; Oegema, Jeff; Brehm, Michael; Cassin, Etienne; Hannak, Eva; Kirkham, Matthew; Pichler, Silke; Flohrs, Kathrin; Goessen, Anoesjka; Leidel, Sebastian; Alleaume, Anne-Marie; Martin, Cécilie; Özlü, Nurhan; Bork, Peer; Hyman, Anthony A. (2000). "Functional genomic analysis of cell division in C. Elegans using RNAi of genes on chromosome III". Nature. 408 (6810): 331–336. Bibcode:2000Natur.408..331G. doi:10.1038/35042526. PMID 11099034. S2CID 4364278.
- Colombo, K.; Grill, Stephan W.; Kimple, Randall J.; Willard, Francis S.; Siderovski, David P.; Gönczy, Pierre (2003). "Translation of Polarity Cues into Asymmetric Spindle Positioning in Caenorhabditis elegans Embryos". Science. 300 (5627): 1957–1961. Bibcode:2003Sci...300.1957C. doi:10.1126/science.1084146. PMID 12750478. S2CID 46204090.
- Leidel, Sebastian; Delattre, Marie; Cerutti, Lorenzo; Baumer, Karine; Gönczy, Pierre (2005). "SAS-6 defines a protein family required for centrosome duplication in C. Elegans and in human cells". Nature Cell Biology. 7 (2): 115–125. doi:10.1038/ncb1220. PMID 15665853. S2CID 4634352.
- Kitagawa, Daiju; Vakonakis, Ioannis; Olieric, Natacha; Hilbert, Manuel; Keller, Debora; Olieric, Vincent; Bortfeld, Miriam; Erat, Michèle C.; Flückiger, Isabelle; Gönczy, Pierre; Steinmetz, Michel O. (2011). "Structural Basis of the 9-Fold Symmetry of Centrioles". Cell. 144 (3): 364–375. doi:10.1016/j.cell.2011.01.008. PMC 3089914. PMID 21277013.
- Guichard, Paul; Hachet, Virginie; Majubu, Norbert; Neves, Aitana; Demurtas, Davide; Olieric, Natacha; Fluckiger, Isabelle; Yamada, Akinori; Kihara, Kumiko; Nishida, Yuichiro; Moriya, Shigeharu; Steinmetz, Michel O.; Hongoh, Yuichi; Gönczy, Pierre (2013). "Native Architecture of the Centriole Proximal Region Reveals Features Underlying Its 9-Fold Radial Symmetry". Current Biology. 23 (17): 1620–1628. doi:10.1016/j.cub.2013.06.061. PMID 23932403. S2CID 17329110.
- Nievergelt, Adrian P.; Banterle, Niccolò; Andany, Santiago H.; Gönczy, Pierre; Fantner, Georg E. (2018). "High-speed photothermal off-resonance atomic force microscopy reveals assembly routes of centriolar scaffold protein SAS-6" (PDF). Nature Nanotechnology. 13 (8): 696–701. Bibcode:2018NatNa..13..696N. doi:10.1038/s41565-018-0149-4. PMID 29784964. S2CID 205567962.
