= Shelterin =

Protein complex serving as a telomere cap

Shelterin (also called telosome) is a protein complex known to protect telomeres in many eukaryotes from DNA repair mechanisms, as well as to regulate telomerase activity. In mammals and other vertebrates, telomeric DNA consists of repeating double-stranded 5'-TTAGGG-3' (G-strand) sequences (2-15 kilobases in humans) along with the 3'-AATCCC-5' (C-strand) complement, ending with a 50-400 nucleotide 3' (G-strand) overhang. Much of the final double-stranded portion of the telomere forms a T-loop (Telomere-loop) that is invaded by the 3' (G-strand) overhang to form a small D-loop (Displacement-loop).

The absence of shelterin causes telomere uncapping and thereby activates damage-signaling pathways that may lead to non-homologous end joining (NHEJ), homology directed repair (HDR), end-to-end fusions, genomic instability, senescence, or apoptosis.

== Subunits ==
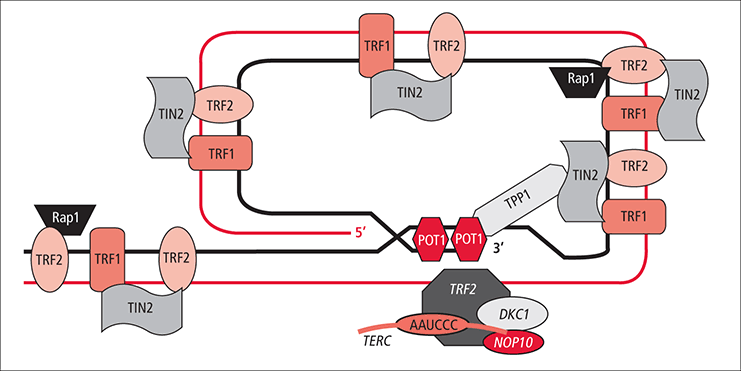
Shelterin coordinates the T-loop and D-loop formations of telomeres

Shelterin has six subunits: TRF1, TRF2, POT1, RAP1, TIN2, and TPP1. They can operate in smaller subsets to regulate the length of or to protect telomeres. In the cells of mice and humans, TRF1, TRF2, TIN2, and RAP1 are about ten times more abundant than TPP1 and POT1.

- TRF1 (Telomere Repeat binding Factor 1): TRF1 is a homodimeric protein that binds to the double-stranded TTAGGG region of the telomere. TRF1 along with TRF2 normally prevents telomerase from adding more telomere units to telomeres. But when telomere lengthening is required, TRF1 recruits helicases and interacts with tankyrases to facilitate the process. TRF1 is highly expressed in stem cells, and is essential for generation of induced pluripotent stem cells. TRF1 is upregulated in the brain cancer glioblastoma multiforme (GBM) in humans and mice, because of the stem-cell quality of the cancer. Genetic ablation and chemical inhibition of TRF1 in mouse models of the brain cancer glioblastoma, and chemical inhibition of cultured human GBM cells inhibited tumor growth. TRF1 levels decrease with aging in humans and in mice. Increasing TRF1 in mice by gene therapy (AAV9 delivery) improved memory and other measures of health span. Conversely, inhibition of the PI3K/AKT pathway decreases TRF1, resulting in telomere-induced DNA damage. TRF1 may recruit PINX1 to inhibit telomere elongation by telomerase.
- TRF2 (Telomere Repeat binding Factor 2) TRF2 is structurally related to TRF1, and helps to form T-loops. TRF2 is a homodimeric protein that binds to the double-stranded TTAGGG region of the telomere and prevents the recognition of double-strand DNA breaks. Overexpression of TRF2 leads to telomere shortening. Loss of TRF2 which leads to loss of the T-loop can activate p53 or ATM-mediated apoptosis.
- Both TRF1 and TRF2 recruit the other four subunits to the telomere. Both TRF1 and TRF2 participate in telomere replication as well as in the prevention of replication fork stalling. Exercise has been shown to upregulate both TRF1 and TRF2 in leukocytes as well as endothelial cells, thereby protecting against apoptosis.
- RAP1 (Repressor / Activator Protein 1): RAP1 is a stabilizing protein associated with TRF2. RAP1 inhibits DNA repair.
- POT1 (Protection of Telomere 1): POT1 contains OB-folds (Oligonucleotide/oligosaccharide Binding) that bind POT1 to single-stranded DNA, which increase its affinity for single-stranded TTAGGG region of telomeric DNA. POT1 helps form the telomere-stabilizing D-loop. POT1 prevents the degradation of this single stranded DNA by nucleases and shelters the 3' G-overhang. POT1 suppresses ATR-mediated DNA repair. Humans only have a single POT1, whereas mice have POT1a and POT1b. POT1a inhibits DNA damage repair at the telomere, whereas POT1b regulates the length of telomeric single-stranded DNA.
- TPP1: TPP1 is a protein associated with POT1, which is encoded by the ACD (gene). The loss of TPP1 leads to impaired POT1 function. When telomeres are to be lengthened, TPP1 is a central factor in recruiting telomerase to telomeres. TPP1 is the only shelterin protein in direct contact with telomerase. TPP1 promotes telomerase processivity in the presence of POT1. But interaction with the CST Complex limits excessive telomere elongation by telomerase. The gene which encodes for TPP1 (ACD) is distinct from the unrelated TPP1 gene on chromosome 11, which encodes tripeptidyl-peptidase I.
- TIN2 (TRF1- and TRF2-Interacting Nuclear Protein 2) TIN2 is a stabilizing protein that binds to TRF1, TRF2, and the TPP1-POT1 complex. thereby bridging units attached to double-stranded DNA and units attached to single-stranded DNA. TIN2 seems to affect telomerase activity, without being in direct contact with that enzyme.

== Repression of DNA repair mechanisms ==
There are two main DNA-damage-signaling pathways that shelterin represses: the ATR kinase pathway, blocked by POT1, and the ATM kinase pathway, blocked by TRF2. In the ATR kinase pathway, ATR and ATRIP sense the presence of single-stranded DNA and induce a phosphorylation cascade that leads to cell cycle arrest. To prevent this signal, POT1 "shelters" the single-stranded region of telomeric DNA. The ATM kinase pathway, which starts from ATM and other proteins sensing double strand breaks, similarly ends with cell cycle arrest. TRF2 may also hide the ends of telomeres, just as POT1 hides the single-stranded regions. Another theory proposes the blocking of the signal downstream. This will lead to a dynamic instability of the cells over time.

TIN2 and TRF2 independently block accumulation of the DNA repair enzyme PARP1 at telomeres.

The structure of the T-loop may prevent NHEJ. For NHEJ to occur, the Ku heterodimer must be able to bind to the ends of the chromosome. Another theory offers the mechanism proposed earlier: TRF2 hides the ends of telomeres.

== Species differences ==
At least four factors contribute to telomere maintenance in most eukaryotes: telomerase, shelterin, TERRA and the CST Complex. Fission yeast (Schizosaccharomyces pombe) has a shelterin complex for protection and maintenance of telomeres, but in budding yeast (Saccharomyces cerevisiae) this function is performed by the CST Complex. For fission yeast, Rap1 and Pot1 are conserved, but Tpz1 is an ortholog of TPP1 and Taz1 is an ortholog of TRF1 and TRF2.

Plants contain a variety of telomere-protecting proteins which can resemble either shelterin or the CST Complex.

The fruit fly Drosophila melanogaster lacks both shelterin and telomerase, but instead uses retrotransposons to maintain telomeres.

== Non-telomeric functions of shelterin proteins ==
TIN2 can localize to mitochondria where it promotes glycolysis. TIN2 loss in human cancer cells has resulted in reduced glycolysis and increased oxidative phosphorylation.

RAP1 regulates transcription and affects NF-κB signaling.

== See also ==
- TERRA (biology)
- CST Complex
