= Joachim Lingner =

Swiss molecular biologist

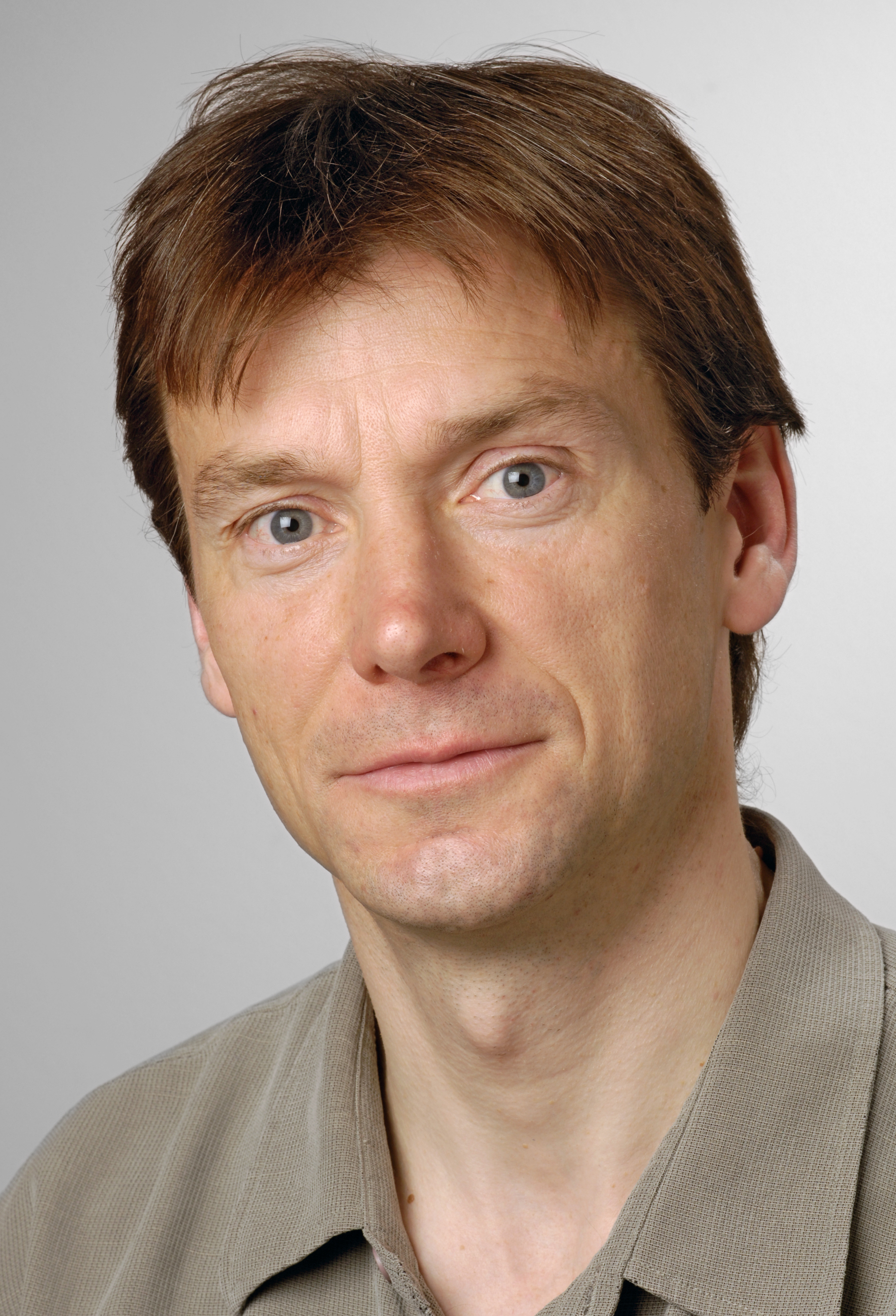
- Joachim Lingner
- Born: 1962 (age 63–64)
- Occupation: Cell biology
- Board member of: EMBO Journal; EMBO Reports; Nucleic Acids Research; SAB Center of Integrative Genomics (CIG), University of Lausanne; ERC starting grant review panel member
- Awards: Friedrich Miescher Prize; ERC Advanced Investigator Award

Academic background
- Education: University of Basel

Academic work
- Discipline: Cell biology
- Institutions: École Polytechnique Fédérale de Lausanne (EPFL)
- Main interests: Telomeres; Telomerase; TERRA long noncoding RNA; Genome stability; Cellular senescence
- Website: https://www.epfl.ch/labs/lingner-lab/

Joachim Lingner (born 1962) is a Swiss molecular biologist. He holds the professorship for life sciences and leads the Lingner Lab at the École Polytechnique Fédérale de Lausanne (EPFL).

== Career ==
Lingner obtained his PhD from the Biozentrum of the University of Basel in 1992. In 1993 he joined the Howard Hughes Medical Institute at University of Colorado at Boulder for postdoctoral studies under the supervision of Thomas Cech. He then joined Swiss Institute for Experimental Cancer Research (ISREC) in Lausanne, Switzerland, first as a junior group leader in 1997 and became senior group leader in 2002. In 2005 he was appointed as associate professor at EPF Lausanne. Since 2009, Lingner is a full professor at EPF Lausanne.

== Research ==
The Lingner Lab studies of the structure, function and maintenance of telomeres, the nucleoprotein complexes at the ends of eukaryotic chromosomes that enable chromosome stability and that regulate cellular lifespan. They elucidated how telomere shortening is counteracted by the telomerase enzyme that renders cancer cells immortal. The lab discovered that telomeres are transcribed into telomeric repeat containing RNA (TERRA), which in turn regulates the telomeric chromatin structure and telomere maintenance by telomerase and homology directed repair. Finally, they developed technologies to uncover the changes that occur in the telomeric proteome during aging and disease including cancer.

== Awards and recognitions ==
Lingner obtained the Friedrich Miescher Prize (2002), was elected as an EMBO member (2005), and received an ERC advanced investigator award (2008), and is a member of the Academia Europaea (2020).

He serves as a member of the scientific advisory board in the Center of Integrative Genomics (CIG) of the University of Lausanne, and has been a member of ERC starting grant review panel.

== Selected works ==
- Feretzaki M, Pospisilova M, Valador Fernandes R, Lunardi T, Krejci L, Lingner J. Rad51-dependent recruitment of TERRA lncRNA to telomeres through R-loops. Nature, Article, in press.
- Vančevska, Aleksandra; Ahmed, Wareed; Pfeiffer, Verena; Feretzaki, Marianna; Boulton, Simon J.; Lingner, Joachim (2020). "SMCHD 1 promotes ATM -dependent DNA damage signaling and repair of uncapped telomeres". The EMBO Journal. 39 (7) e102668. doi:10.15252/embj.2019102668. PMC 7110143. PMID 32080884.
- Porro, Antonio; Feuerhahn, Sascha; Delafontaine, Julien; Riethman, Harold; Rougemont, Jacques; Lingner, Joachim (2014). "Functional characterization of the TERRA transcriptome at damaged telomeres". Nature Communications. 5 5379. Bibcode:2014NatCo...5.5379P. doi:10.1038/ncomms6379. PMC 4264578. PMID 25359189.
- Grolimund, Larissa; Aeby, Eric; Hamelin, Romain; Armand, Florence; Chiappe, Diego; Moniatte, Marc; Lingner, Joachim (2013). "A quantitative telomeric chromatin isolation protocol identifies different telomeric states". Nature Communications. 4 2848. Bibcode:2013NatCo...4.2848G. doi:10.1038/ncomms3848. PMID 24270157.
- Chen, Liuh-Yow; Redon, Sophie; Lingner, Joachim (2012). "The human CST complex is a terminator of telomerase activity" (PDF). Nature. 488 (7412): 540–544. Bibcode:2012Natur.488..540C. doi:10.1038/nature11269. PMID 22763445. S2CID 4412583.
- Azzalin, C. M.; Reichenbach, P.; Khoriauli, L.; Giulotto, E.; Lingner, J. (2007). "Telomeric Repeat Containing RNA and RNA Surveillance Factors at Mammalian Chromosome Ends". Science. 318 (5851): 798–801. Bibcode:2007Sci...318..798A. doi:10.1126/science.1147182. PMID 17916692. S2CID 20693275.
- Ahmed, Wareed; Lingner, Joachim (2018). "PRDX1 and MTH1 cooperate to prevent ROS-mediated inhibition of telomerase". Genes & Development. 32 (9–10): 658–669. doi:10.1101/gad.313460.118. PMC 6004070. PMID 29773556.
- Teixeira, M.Teresa; Arneric, Milica; Sperisen, Peter; Lingner, Joachim (2004). "Telomere Length Homeostasis is Achieved via a Switch between Telomerase- Extendible and -Nonextendible States". Cell. 117 (3): 323–335. doi:10.1016/s0092-8674(04)00334-4. PMID 15109493. S2CID 18179591.
