= HOXC4 =

Protein-coding gene in the species Homo sapiens

Identifiers
- Aliases: HOXC4, HOX3, HOX3E, cp19, homeobox C4
- External IDs: OMIM: 142974; MGI: 96195; GeneCards: HOXC4

Gene location (Human)
Chr.	Chromosome 12 (human)
Band	12q13.13	Start	54,016,931 bp
Band	12q13.13	End	54,056,030 bp

Gene location (Mouse)
Chr.	Chromosome 15 (mouse)
Band	15 F3|15 58.08 cM	Start	102,927,366 bp
Band	15 F3|15 58.08 cM	End	102,945,278 bp
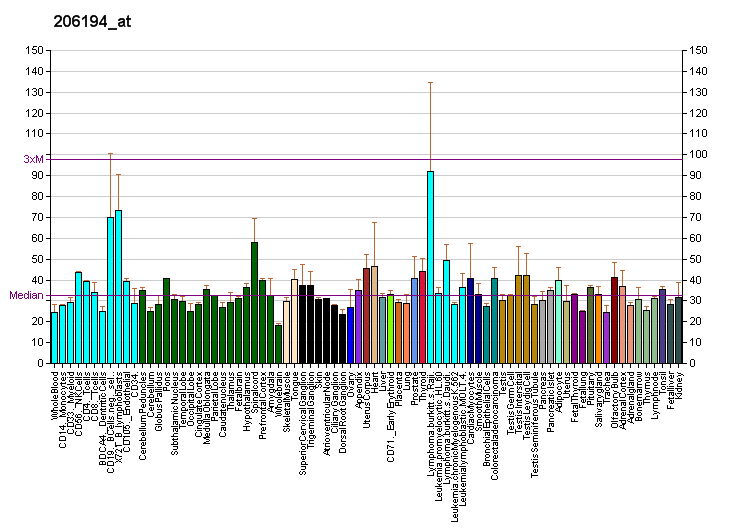
RNA expression pattern
Bgee	Human / Mouse (ortholog); Top expressed in: right uterine tube; vena cava; renal medulla; saphenous vein; pons; left uterine tube; tibial arteries; caput epididymis; testicle; spinal ganglia / Top expressed in: superior cervical ganglion; tail of embryo; efferent ductule; dermis; abdominal wall; somite; esophagus; epididymis; cumulus cell; migratory enteric neural crest cell; More reference expression data
BioGPS	More reference expression data
Gene ontology
Molecular function	DNA-binding transcription factor activity; sequence-specific DNA binding; HMG box domain binding; DNA binding; protein binding; RNA polymerase II cis-regulatory region sequence-specific DNA binding; DNA-binding transcription activator activity, RNA polymerase II-specific; DNA-binding transcription factor activity, RNA polymerase II-specific; RNA polymerase II transcription regulatory region sequence-specific DNA binding
Cellular component	nucleus
Biological process	multicellular organism development; skeletal system development; cartilage development; regulation of transcription, DNA-templated; embryonic organ morphogenesis; transcription, DNA-templated; anterior/posterior pattern specification; transcription by RNA polymerase II; positive regulation of transcription by RNA polymerase II; embryonic skeletal system morphogenesis
Sources:Amigo / QuickGO
Orthologs
Databases	NCBI: entry; OMA: entry
Species	Human	Mouse
Entrez	3221	15423
Ensembl	ENSG00000198353	ENSMUSG00000075394
UniProt	P09017; Q86TF7	Q08624
RefSeq (mRNA)	NM_153633; NM_014620	NM_013553
RefSeq (protein)	NP_055435; NP_705897; NP_055435.2; NP_705897.1	NP_038581
Location (UCSC)	Chr 12: 54.02 – 54.06 Mb	Chr 15: 102.93 – 102.95 Mb
PubMed search
- Wikidata
View/Edit Human	View/Edit Mouse

Homeobox protein Hox-C4 is a protein that in humans is encoded by the HOXC4 gene.

== Function ==
This gene belongs to the homeobox family of genes. The homeobox genes encode a highly conserved family of transcription factors that play an important role in morphogenesis in all multicellular organisms. Mammals possess four similar homeobox gene clusters, HOXA, HOXB, HOXC and HOXD, which are located on different chromosomes and consist of 9 to 11 genes arranged in tandem. This gene, HOXC4, is one of several homeobox HOXC genes located in a cluster on chromosome 12. Three genes, HOXC5, HOXC4 and HOXC6, share a 5' non-coding exon. Transcripts may include the shared exon spliced to the gene-specific exons, or they may include only the gene-specific exons. Two alternatively spliced variants that encode the same protein have been described for HOXC4. Transcript variant one includes the shared exon, and transcript variant two includes only gene-specific exons.

== See also ==
- Homeobox

== Interactions ==
HOXC4 has been shown to interact with Ku70.
