= Mir-615 microRNA precursor family =

mir-615

Identifiers
- Symbol: mir-615
- Rfam: RF00879
- miRBase family: MIPF0000342

Other data
- RNA type: microRNA
- Domain: Eukaryota
- PDB structures: PDBe

mir-615 microRNA is a short non-coding RNA molecule belonging both to the family of microRNAs and to that of small interfering RNAs (siRNAs). MicroRNAs function to regulate the expression levels of other genes by several mechanisms, whilst siRNAs are involved primarily with the RNA interference (RNAi) pathway. siRNAs have been linked through some members to the regulation of cancer cell growth, specifically in prostate adenocarcinoma.

== miR-615 and NGX6 ==
Nasopharyngeal carcinoma-associated gene 6 (NGX6) acts as a tumour suppressor gene in colon cancer. miR-615 has been found to be downregulated in NGX6-transfected cells, although identification of its target genes has not yet been achieved.

== Hox cluster conservation ==
miR-615 has been found to reside within Hox gene clusters, alongside Hox genes other miRNAs. Hox genes are involved in anterior-posterior axis patterning. miR-615 is located at the HOXC5 (encdoing the HOXC5 homeobox protein) intron in mammals.

== See also ==
- MicroRNA
