= Lingner =

Lingner is a surname. Notable people with the surname include:

- Adam Lingner (born 1960), American football player
- Joachim Lingner (born 1962), Swiss molecular biologist
