= HOXC5 =

Protein-coding gene in the species Homo sapiens

Identifiers
- Aliases: HOXC5, CP11, HOX3, HOX3D, homeobox C5
- External IDs: OMIM: 142973; MGI: 96196; GeneCards: HOXC5

Gene location (Human)
Chr.	Chromosome 12 (human)
Band	12q13.13	Start	54,033,050 bp
Band	12q13.13	End	54,035,361 bp

Gene location (Mouse)
Chr.	Chromosome 15 (mouse)
Band	15 F3|15 58.07 cM	Start	102,875,878 bp
Band	15 F3|15 58.07 cM	End	102,925,861 bp
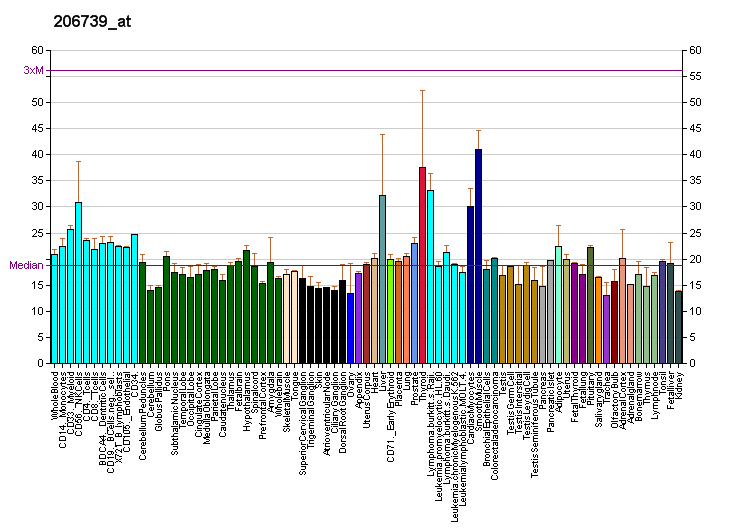
RNA expression pattern
Bgee	Human / Mouse (ortholog); Top expressed in: gonad; left uterine tube; right ovary; right uterine tube; left ovary; fundus; body of stomach; granulocyte; popliteal artery; tibial arteries / Top expressed in: thoracic vertebral column; tail of embryo; superior cervical ganglion; urethra; male urethra; esophagus; genital tubercle; neural tube; embryo; paraxial mesoderm; More reference expression data
BioGPS	More reference expression data
Gene ontology
Molecular function	DNA-binding transcription factor activity; sequence-specific DNA binding; DNA binding; DNA-binding transcription factor activity, RNA polymerase II-specific; RNA polymerase II cis-regulatory region sequence-specific DNA binding; DNA-binding transcription activator activity, RNA polymerase II-specific; transcription factor activity, RNA polymerase II distal enhancer sequence-specific binding
Cellular component	cell junction; nucleus; nucleoplasm
Biological process	regulation of transcription by RNA polymerase II; multicellular organism development; regulation of transcription, DNA-templated; transcription, DNA-templated; anterior/posterior pattern specification; embryonic skeletal system development; positive regulation of transcription by RNA polymerase II
Sources:Amigo / QuickGO
Orthologs
Databases	NCBI: entry; OMA: entry
Species	Human	Mouse
Entrez	3222	15424
Ensembl	ENSG00000172789	ENSMUSG00000022485
UniProt	Q00444	P32043
RefSeq (mRNA)	NM_018953	NM_175730
RefSeq (protein)	NP_061826	NP_783857
Location (UCSC)	Chr 12: 54.03 – 54.04 Mb	Chr 15: 102.88 – 102.93 Mb
PubMed search
- Wikidata
View/Edit Human	View/Edit Mouse

Homeobox protein Hox-C5 is a protein that in humans is encoded by the HOXC5 gene.

== Function ==
This gene belongs to the homeobox family of genes. The homeobox genes encode a highly conserved family of transcription factors that play an important role in morphogenesis in all multicellular organisms. Mammals possess four similar homeobox gene clusters, HOXA, HOXB, HOXC and HOXD, which are located on different chromosomes and consist of 9 to 11 genes arranged in tandem. This gene, HOXC5, is one of several homeobox HOXC genes located in a cluster on chromosome 12. Three genes, HOXC5, HOXC4 and HOXC6, share a 5' non-coding exon. Transcripts may include the shared exon spliced to the gene-specific exons, or they may include only the gene-specific exons. Two alternatively spliced variants have been described for HOXC5. The transcript variant which includes the shared exon apparently doesn't encode a protein. The protein-coding transcript variant contains gene-specific exons only.
