= TERRA (biology) =

Telomeric repeat-containing RNA

TERRA in biology is an abbreviation for "TElomeric Repeat-containing RNA". TERRA is RNA that is transcribed from telomeres — the repeating 6-nucleotide sequences that cap the ends of chromosomes. TERRA functions with shelterin to inhibit telomere lengthening by enzyme telomerase. However, other studies have shown that under certain conditions TERRA can recruit telomerase to telomeres.

TERRAs are essential for telomere length and maintenance. At least four factors contribute to telomere maintenance: telomerase, shelterin, TERRA and the CST Complex.

TERRA can also regulate telomere length by increasing euchromatin formation. On the other hand, nonsense-mediated decay factor enrichment at telomeres may exist to prevent TERRA inhibition of telomerase. TERRA levels vary during the cell cycle, decreasing during S phase, and increasing in the transition from G2 phase to G1 phase.
