= CST complex =

The CST complex is a cellular multiprotein complex involved in telomere maintenance. In budding yeast (Saccharomyces cerevisiae), it is composed of the proteins Cdc13, Stn1, and Ten1; in mammals, it consists of the proteins CTC1, STN1, and TEN1. It is related to the replication protein A complex.

== Structure ==
For budding yeast as well as for mammals, CST is a protein heterotrimer, consisting of three distinct proteins. Yeast Stn1 and Ten1 are orthologous proteins to mammalian STN1 and TEN1. But yeast Cdc13 and mammalian CTC1 are very different in amino acid sequence, length, and to some extent in function.

== Function ==
For both budding yeast and mammals, the CST complex contributes to telomere maintenance, but this function is more crucial for budding yeast, where the CST complex performs the functions that shelterin performs in vertebrates. At least four factors contribute to telomere maintenance: telomerase, shelterin, TERRA and the CST Complex. CST protection of telomeres for mammals occurs under conditions of replication stress. But when not replicating DNA, mammals primarily require shelterin for telomere protection. T-loops and G-quadruplexes are described as the two tertiary DNA structures that protect telomere ends and regulate telomere length. In fungus, the CST complex has been shown to unfold higher order G-tailed structures, such as occur with telomere exposure during DNA replication.

== See also ==
- Shelterin
