= Ku70 =

Protein found in humans

XRCC6
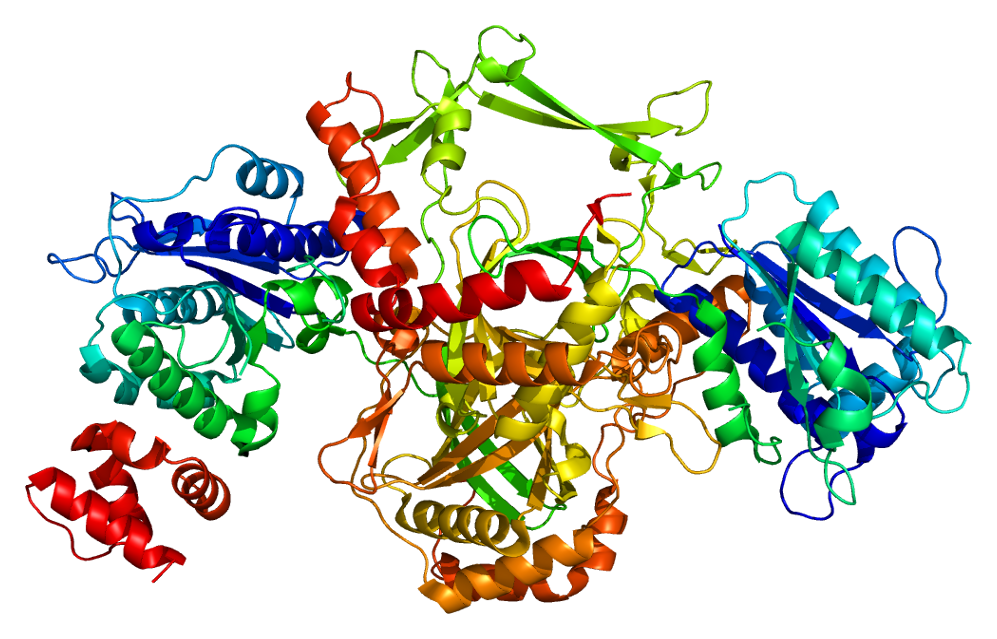

Identifiers
- Aliases: XRCC6, X-ray repair complementing defective repair in Chinese hamster cells 6, CTC75, CTCBF, G22P1, KU70, ML8, TLAA, X-ray repair cross complementing 6
- External IDs: OMIM: 152690; MGI: 95606; GeneCards: XRCC6
Available structures
PDB	Ortholog search: PDBe RCSB
PDB	List of PDB id codes 1JEQ, 1JEY, 1JJR, 3RZX
Enzyme activity
EC #	BRENDA	ExPASy	KEGG	MetaCyc
4.2.99.18	↗	↗	↗	↗
5.6.2.4	↗	↗	↗	↗

Gene location (Human)
Chr.	Chromosome 22 (human)
Band	22q13.2	Start	41,621,163 bp
Band	22q13.2	End	41,664,048 bp

Gene location (Mouse)
Chr.	Chromosome 15 (mouse)
Band	15 E1|15 38.33 cM	Start	81,872,036 bp
Band	15 E1|15 38.33 cM	End	81,924,286 bp
RNA expression pattern
Bgee	Human / Mouse (ortholog); Top expressed in: right testis; left testis; ventricular zone; islet of Langerhans; embryo; ganglionic eminence; Achilles tendon; right adrenal gland; thymus; beta cell / Top expressed in: thymus; otic placode; saccule; otic vesicle; neural layer of retina; tail of embryo; epiblast; ventricular zone; genital tubercle; right lobe of liver; More reference expression data
BioGPS	n/a
Gene ontology
Molecular function	nucleotide binding; double-stranded telomeric DNA binding; telomeric DNA binding; helicase activity; 5'-deoxyribose-5-phosphate lyase activity; DNA helicase activity; protein C-terminus binding; catalytic activity; protein binding; lyase activity; hydrolase activity; ATP binding; DNA binding; double-stranded DNA binding; damaged DNA binding; RNA binding; cyclin binding; protein-containing complex binding
Cellular component	cytosol; nuclear telomere cap complex; membrane; transcription regulator complex; chromosome; nucleoplasm; nonhomologous end joining complex; nucleus; Ku70:Ku80 complex; cytoplasm; extracellular region; secretory granule lumen; ficolin-1-rich granule lumen; protein-DNA complex; nucleolus; protein-containing complex
Biological process	double-strand break repair via classical nonhomologous end joining; protein heterotetramerization; regulation of transcription, DNA-templated; regulation of smooth muscle cell proliferation; transcription, DNA-templated; cellular response to DNA damage stimulus; positive regulation of transcription, DNA-templated; DNA ligation; establishment of integrated proviral latency; metabolism; negative regulation of transcription, DNA-templated; double-strand break repair via nonhomologous end joining; telomere maintenance; positive regulation of type I interferon production; positive regulation of transcription by RNA polymerase II; DNA duplex unwinding; DNA repair; cellular hyperosmotic salinity response; brain development; DNA recombination; neutrophil degranulation; cellular response to gamma radiation; cellular response to X-ray; positive regulation of protein kinase activity; activation of innate immune response; immune system process; innate immune response
Sources:Amigo / QuickGO
Orthologs
Databases	NCBI: entry; OMA: entry
Species	Human	Mouse
Entrez	2547	14375
Ensembl	ENSG00000196419	ENSMUSG00000022471
UniProt	P12956	P23475
RefSeq (mRNA)	NM_001469; NM_001288976; NM_001288977; NM_001288978	NM_010247
RefSeq (protein)	NP_001275905; NP_001275906; NP_001275907; NP_001460; NP_001275905.1 NP_001460.1	NP_034377
Location (UCSC)	Chr 22: 41.62 – 41.66 Mb	Chr 15: 81.87 – 81.92 Mb
PubMed search
- Wikidata
View/Edit Human	View/Edit Mouse

Ku70 is a heterodimeric protein made up of Ku70 and Ku80, which together form Ku. In humans, is encoded by the XRCC6 gene. Ku70 plays a critical role in the DNA repair, maintenance and many other cellular processes.

== Function ==
Together, Ku70 and Ku80 make up the Ku heterodimer form a quasi-symmetric structure, which encircles the double-stranded DNA. The DNA double-strand break ends and is required for the non-homologous end joining (NHEJ) of the DNA repair pathway. It is also required for V(D)J recombination, which utilizes the NHEJ pathway to promote antigen diversity in the mammalian immune system. Ku70 is key for sensing and responding to cytosolic DNA, which is essential for the indication of infection. Within the heterodimer, Ku70 specifically binds directly to broken ends of double-stranded DNA breaks, or DSBs. Then together, Ku70 and Ku80 will tightly form a ring-like structure around the DNA strand, preventing further degradation. These steps are essential for the success of non-homologous end joining.

The Ku70 subunit is located proximal to the DNA end. The Ku70 homodimer will stably bind 50 bp dsDNA substrate-forming complexes, allowing the DSBs to successfully enter the heterodimer, Ku's, central cavity. The Ku70 and Ku80 subunits can be expressed individually, however no DNA binding was observed from these isolated subunits. Lysine reside found in the Ku70 N-terminal domain is critical for the end processing functionality of the Ku heterodimer.

In addition to its role in NHEJ, Ku is also required for telomere length maintenance and subtelomeric gene silencing.

Ku was originally identified when patients with systemic lupus erythematosus were found to have high levels of autoantibodies to the protein.

Ku70 was also discovered to be an inhibitor of Bax-dependent signaling pathway. Suppression of Ku70 demonstrated the increase in Bax-dependent apoptosis. Interactions between Ku70 and Bax occurs in the C-terminus of Ku70 and the N-terminus of Bax. These specific interactions result in the cytosolic sequestration of Bax.

== Aging ==
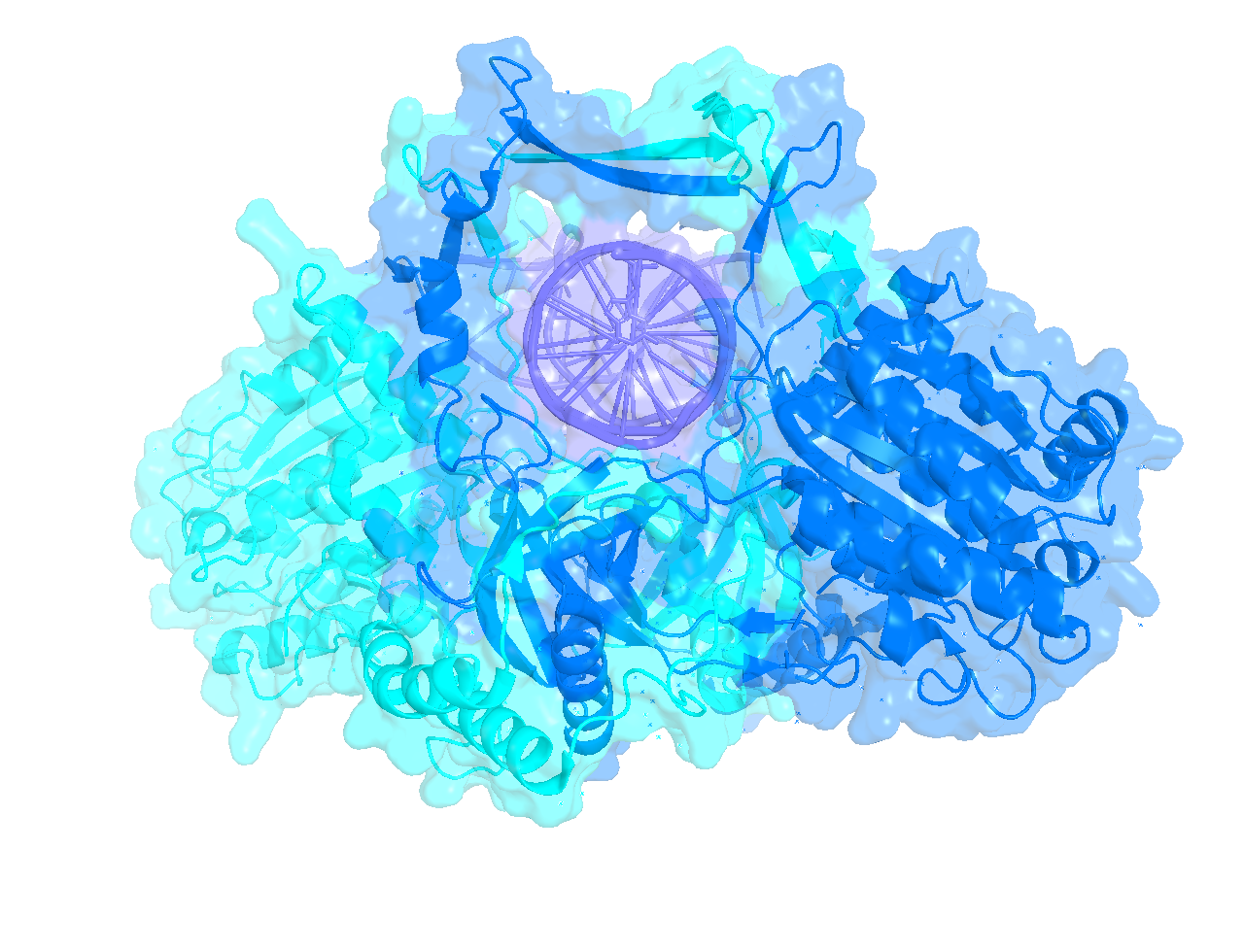
Structure of the Ku protein, highlighting the Ku70 (light blue), Ku80 (dark blue), and DNA (purple) subunits. The DNA subunit fills the central cavity of the Ku heterodimer. The Ku70 and Ku80 heterodimer encircles the duplex DNA to carry out DNA repair functionality.

Mouse embryonic stem cells with homozygous Ku70 mutations, that is Ku70^{−/−} cells, have markedly increased sensitivity to ionizing radiation compared to heterozygous Ku70^{+/−} or wild-type Ku70^{+/+} embryonic stem cells. Mutant mice deficient in Ku70 exhibit early aging. Using several specific criteria of aging, the mutant mice were found to display the same aging signs as control mice, but at a considerably earlier chronological age. These results suggest that reduced ability to repair DNA double-strand breaks causes early aging, and that the wild-type Ku70 gene plays an important role in longevity assurance. (Also see DNA damage theory of aging.)

== Clinical ==
A mutation in this gene has been described in a set of 24 families with autism. While this is suggestive that this gene may play a role in the development of autism, further investigation is required.

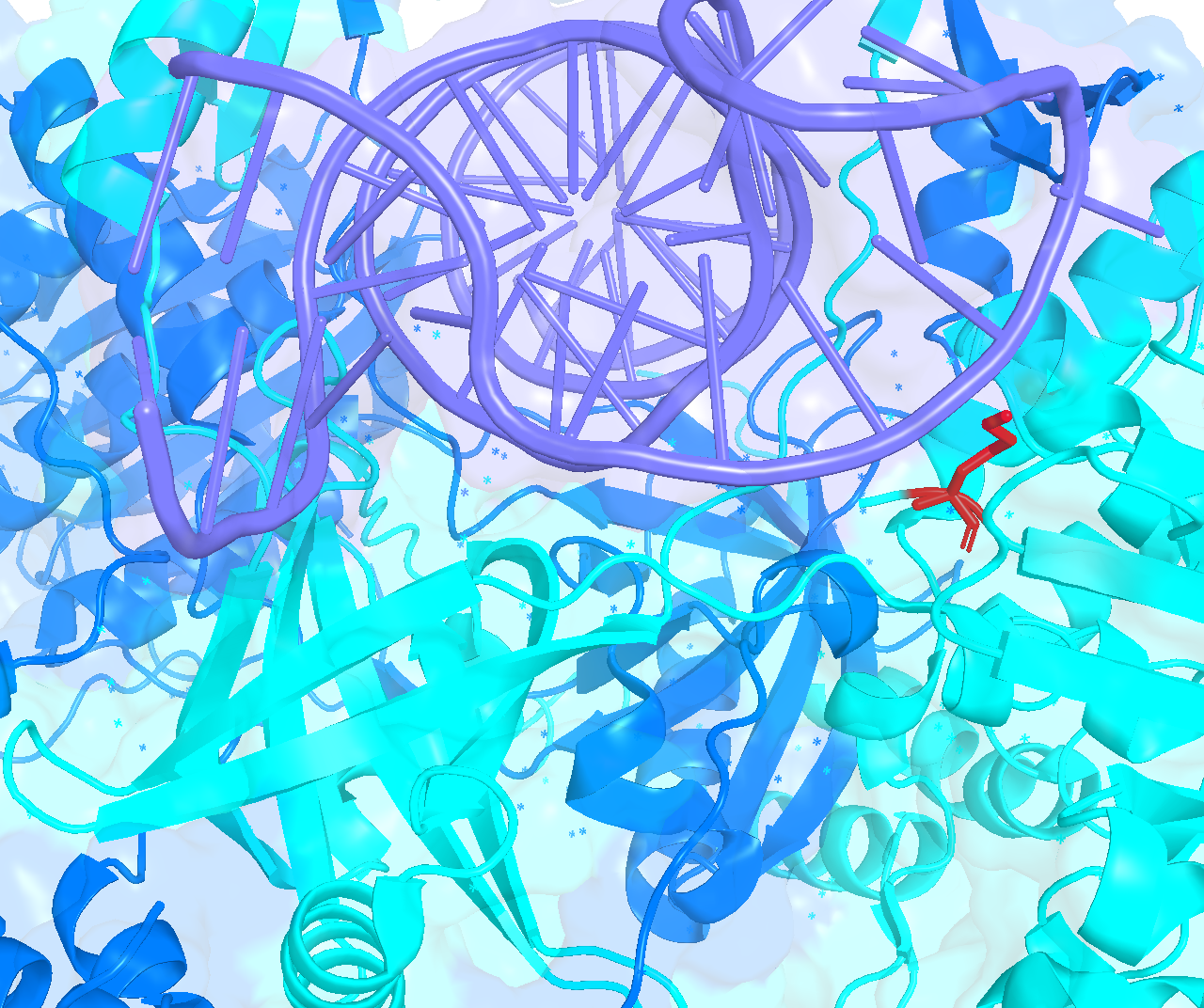
Active site that is crucial for the functionality of Ku highlighted in red. 5' lyase activity and end processing of Ku is dependent on the lysine residue found on the Ku70 N-terminal domain (highlighted in red).

Recent studies demonstrate that Ku proteins, when exactly balanced have the ability to act as a tumor suppressor gene. However, if there is an over-expression of Ku, it may act an oncoprotein. The presence of Ku of NHEJ in tumors affect the response to radiotherapy or chemotherapy, demonstrating the possibility that Ku has the potential to be used as a means to overcome resistance in cancer treatments.

== Nomenclature ==
Ku70 has been referred to by several names including:

- Lupus Ku autoantigen protein p70
- ATP-dependent DNA helicase 2 subunit 1
- X-ray repair complementing defective repair in Chinese hamster cells 6
- X-ray repair cross-complementing 6 (XRCC6)

== Interactions ==
Ku70 has been shown to interact with:

- CBX5,
- CHEK1,
- CREBBP,
- GCN5L2,
- HOXC4,
- Ku80,
- MRE11A,
- NCOA6,
- NCF4,
- PCNA,
- PTTG1,
- RPA2,
- TERF2,
- TERT
- VAV1, and
- WRN.
