= Swiss Institute for Experimental Cancer Research =

Swiss not-for-profit institution

Coordinates: 46.5428°N 6.6613°E

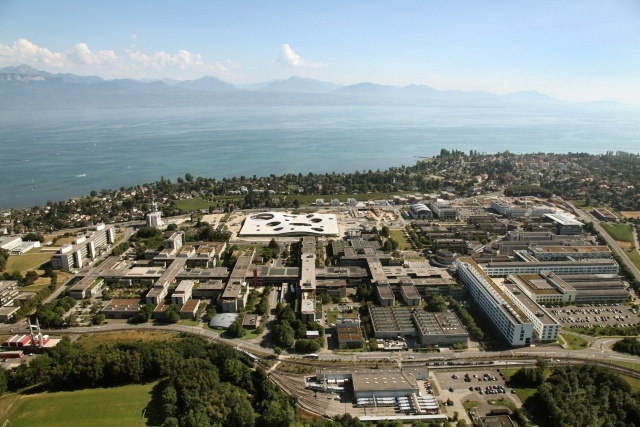
Since 2008, the Swiss Institute for Experimental Cancer Research is part of the École polytechnique fédérale de Lausanne (EPFL). It is located on the Lausanne campus (Switzerland).

The Swiss Institute for Experimental Cancer Research (ISREC, French: Institut suisse de recherche expérimentale sur le cancer) is a not-for-profit institution founded in 1964 and located in Épalinges, Switzerland.

Since 1 January 2008, it is organized into two distinct entities:

- The ISREC Foundation whose mission is to continue to seek and provide resources for the support of translational cancer research projects and the training of young scientists.
- The Swiss Institute for Experimental Cancer Research (ISREC), at the School of Life Sciences of the EPFL, whose research projects are oriented towards fundamental cancer research.

== History ==
The ISREC has its origins in the history of the Centre anti-cancéreux romand (CACR), which was founded in 1924 in Lausanne. Initially, the CACR was composed of three main departments: pathology, experimental research and a therapeutic service. The appointment of Alfredo Vannotti (1907–2002) as Head of the experimental research service in 1947 and the appointment one year later of Serge Neukomm (born 1917), led to the development of experimental research. In the 1950s, the medico-social activities were maintained, but in 1957, they were taken up by the cantonal leagues. The CACR then limited its activities to experimental research on cancer.

Under the leadership of Rudolf Stadler (Chairman since 1951) and Henri Isliker (Director), ISREC was created on 18 June 1964 as a Swiss foundation. Initially, the ISREC was situated next to the University Hospital of Lausanne (CHUV). The ISREC was growing steadily. In 1970, the collaboration of the ISREC with the Institute of Biochemistry of the University of Lausanne, the WHO Immunology Research and Training Centre and the Lausanne branch of Ludwig Cancer Research constituted a critical mass of over 150 scientists. The space in the building on the rue du Bugnon became totally inadequate. The ISREC built a new research center in Epalinges and moved there in autumn 1976. In 1978, Henri Isliker handed the direction of ISREC to Bernhard Hirt who headed the Institute for 18 years. In 1996, Michel Aguet took over as director.

In 2008, the research groups of the Institute were integrated into the EPFL – School of Life Sciences and in 2009, Douglas Hanahan was nominated director of the Institute.

The ISREC Foundation (President Yves J. Paternot) continues to seek and to provide resources to support projects having a broad potential of diagnostic or therapeutic innovation in cancer research.

== Research ==
The Swiss Institute for Experimental Cancer Research has, for nearly 60 years of its existence as an independent institute, been devoted to cancer related basic research. Since its integration as an institute into the EPFL School of Life Sciences on 1 January 2008, and the renewal of a substantial part of its scientific staff, its research focuses on areas including genome stability, cell proliferation and differentiation, and the role of developmental pathways in tumorigenesis and tumor progression.

== Publications ==
Between 1964 and today more than 2,000 articles were published by ISREC researchers in various scientific journals, notably in Cell, Nature and Science.

== Honors (selection) ==
The research conducted by ISREC members has been distinguished by major awards. These include:

- Marcel Benoist Prize:
  - 1976: Jean-Charles Cerottini and Theodor K. Brunner
  - 1995: Henri Isliker
- Friedrich Miescher Prize:
  - 1976: Heidi Diggelmann
  - 1982: Otto Hagenbüchle and Ueli Schibler
  - 1992: Erich Nigg
  - 1994: Susan Gasser
  - 1998: Bruno Amati
  - 2002: Joachim Lingner

== Bibliography ==
- ISREC Institute and Foundation, Epalinges: 2004
- Henri Isliker, History of Cancer Research in Lausanne. Professional memories assembled by Henri Isliker, Lausanne: 2006
- Robert Olivier, Francesco Panes, Dictionary of professors from the University of Lausanne since 1890, Lausanne: University of Lausanne: 2000

== See also ==
- Swiss Cancer Centre
- Science and technology in Switzerland
