= Adrenocortical dysplasia protein homolog =

Protein found in humans

ACD
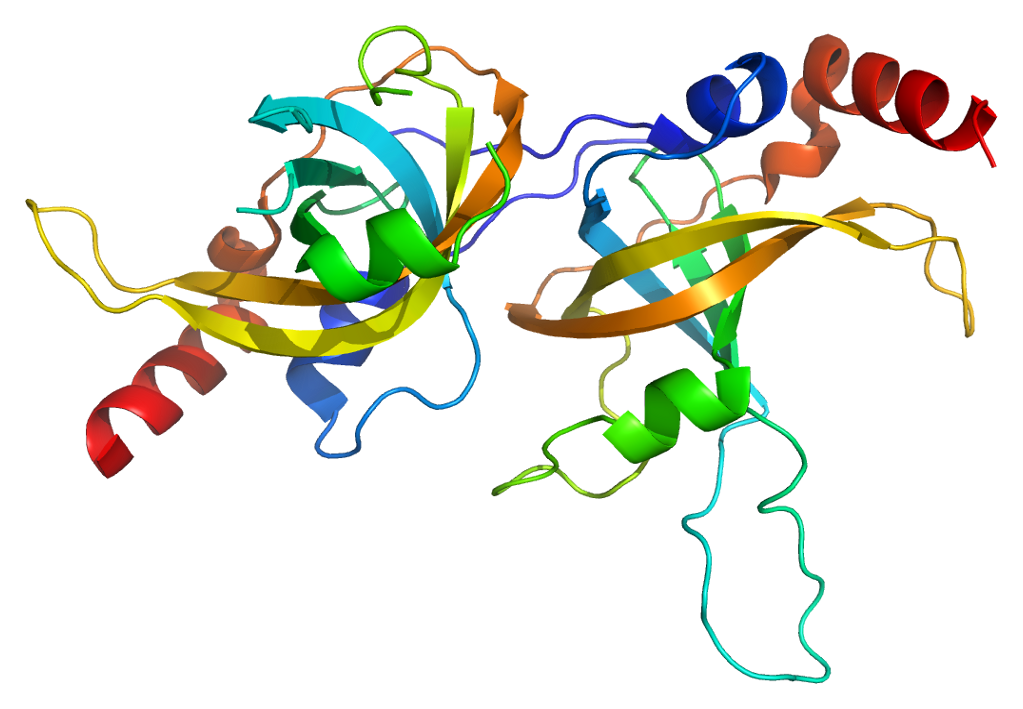
Available structures
PDB	Ortholog search: PDBe RCSB
PDB	List of PDB id codes 2I46

Identifiers
- Aliases: ACD, PIP1, PTOP, TINT1, TPP1, adrenocortical dysplasia homolog, shelterin complex subunit and telomerase recruitment factor, ACD shelterin complex subunit and telomerase recruitment factor
- External IDs: OMIM: 609377; MGI: 87873; HomoloGene: 23391; GeneCards: ACD; OMA:ACD - orthologs

Gene location (Human)
Chr.	Chromosome 16 (human)
Band	16q22.1	Start	67,657,512 bp
Band	16q22.1	End	67,660,810 bp

Gene location (Mouse)
Chr.	Chromosome 8 (mouse)
Band	8 D3|8 53.04 cM	Start	106,422,492 bp
Band	8 D3|8 53.04 cM	End	106,427,734 bp
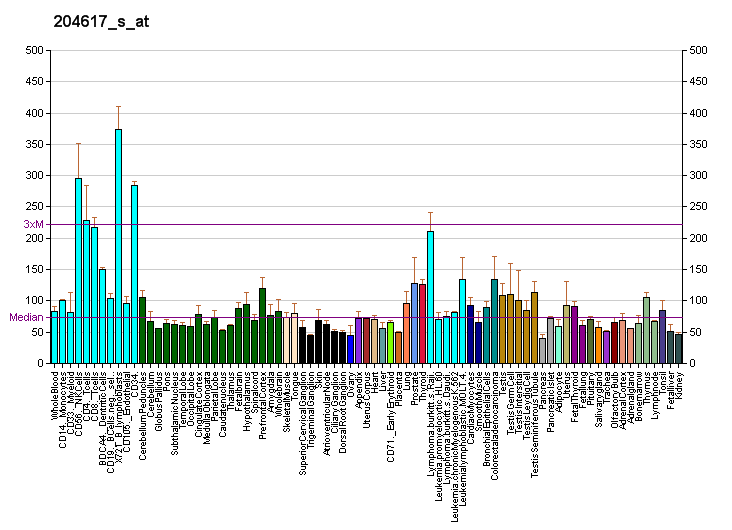
RNA expression pattern
Bgee	Human / Mouse (ortholog); Top expressed in: right hemisphere of cerebellum; oocyte; secondary oocyte; pituitary gland; anterior pituitary; left ovary; right frontal lobe; right ovary; right testis; granulocyte / Top expressed in: zygote; secondary oocyte; ventricular zone; blastocyst; primary oocyte; ganglionic eminence; thymus; neural tube; right kidney; superior frontal gyrus; More reference expression data
BioGPS	More reference expression data
Gene ontology
Molecular function	DNA binding; telomeric DNA binding; DNA polymerase binding; protein binding; protein-containing complex binding
Cellular component	nuclear telomere cap complex; chromosome; telomere; nucleus; nucleoplasm; nuclear body; shelterin complex
Biological process	skeletal system development; positive regulation of single-stranded telomeric DNA binding; protection from non-homologous end joining at telomere; protein localization to chromosome, telomeric region; embryonic limb morphogenesis; establishment of protein localization to telomere; urogenital system development; intracellular protein transport; telomere assembly; segmentation; telomere maintenance; telomere capping; negative regulation of telomere maintenance via telomerase; positive regulation of telomere maintenance via telomerase; positive regulation of telomerase activity; mitotic telomere maintenance via semi-conservative replication; telomere-telomerase complex assembly
Sources:Amigo / QuickGO
Orthologs
Species	Human	Mouse
Entrez	65057	497652
Ensembl	ENSG00000102977	ENSMUSG00000038000
UniProt	Q96AP0	Q5EE38
RefSeq (mRNA)	NM_001082486; NM_001082487; NM_022914	NM_001012638; NM_001348349
RefSeq (protein)	NP_001075955; NP_075065	NP_001012656; NP_001335278
Location (UCSC)	Chr 16: 67.66 – 67.66 Mb	Chr 8: 106.42 – 106.43 Mb
PubMed search
- Wikidata
View/Edit Human	View/Edit Mouse

Adrenocortical dysplasia protein homolog is a protein that in humans is encoded by the ACD gene.

== Function ==
This gene encodes a protein that is involved in telomere function. This protein is one of six core proteins in the telosome/shelterin telomeric complex, which functions to maintain telomere length and to protect telomere ends. Through its interaction with other components, this protein plays a key role in the assembly and stabilization of this complex, and it mediates the access of telomerase to the telomere. Multiple transcript variants encoding different isoforms have been found for this gene. This gene, which is also referred to as TPP1, is distinct from the unrelated TPP1 gene on chromosome 11, which encodes tripeptidyl-peptidase I.

TPP1 is a component of the telomere-specific shelterin complex, which facilitates the replication of the double-stranded telomeric DNA tracts and protects the telomeric end from unregulated DNA repair activities. TPP1 mainly functions as a regulator of telomerase recruitment, activation, and regulation. Although TPP1 was originally described as a bridging factor between TRF1 and TRF2, which participate in a pathway with POT1 as a negative regulator of telomerase-dependent telomere length control, more recent studies suggest that TPP1 could directly promotes telomerase activity at the telomere. TPP1 is both necessary and sufficient to recruit the telomerase enzyme to telomeres, and is the only shelterin protein in direct contact with telomerase.

A part of the TPP1 oligonucleotide/oligosaccharide-binding fold named TEL patch that interacts with the catalytic subunit of telomerase, hTERT, has been proven essential for telomerase activation. TPP1 has also been demonstrated as the only pathway required for recruitment of telomerase to chromosome ends, and it also defines telomere length homeostasis in hESCs.

== Interactions ==
ACD (gene) has been shown to interact with POT1 and TINF2.

- POT1
- hTERT
- TIN2
- TRF1
- TRF2
- Telomerase
