= HOXC6 =

Protein-coding gene in the species Homo sapiens

Identifiers
- Aliases: HOXC6, CP25, HHO.C8, HOX3, HOX3C, homeobox C6
- External IDs: OMIM: 142972; MGI: 96197; GeneCards: HOXC6

Gene location (Human)
Chr.	Chromosome 12 (human)
Band	12q13.13	Start	53,990,624 bp
Band	12q13.13	End	54,030,823 bp

Gene location (Mouse)
Chr.	Chromosome 15 (mouse)
Band	15 F3|15 58.06 cM	Start	102,906,689 bp
Band	15 F3|15 58.06 cM	End	102,920,313 bp
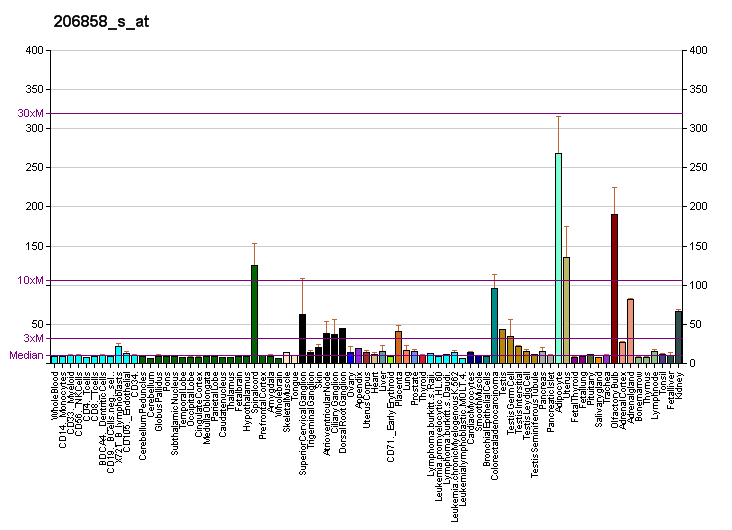
RNA expression pattern
Bgee	Human / Mouse (ortholog); Top expressed in: renal medulla; caput epididymis; germinal epithelium; nipple; saphenous vein; corpus epididymis; skin of hip; Skeletal muscle tissue of rectus abdominis; spinal ganglia; lactiferous duct / Top expressed in: tail of embryo; thoracic vertebral column; efferent ductule; muscle of thigh; genital tubercle; female urethra; adrenal gland; male urethra; lumbar subsegment of spinal cord; yolk sac; More reference expression data
BioGPS	More reference expression data
Gene ontology
Molecular function	DNA-binding transcription factor activity; sequence-specific DNA binding; DNA binding; transcription corepressor activity; DNA-binding transcription factor activity, RNA polymerase II-specific; RNA polymerase II cis-regulatory region sequence-specific DNA binding; DNA-binding transcription activator activity, RNA polymerase II-specific; transcription factor activity, RNA polymerase II distal enhancer sequence-specific binding
Cellular component	nucleus; nucleoplasm; cytosol
Biological process	regulation of transcription by RNA polymerase II; regulation of transcription, DNA-templated; transcription, DNA-templated; anterior/posterior pattern specification; embryonic skeletal system development; negative regulation of nucleic acid-templated transcription; multicellular organism development; positive regulation of transcription by RNA polymerase II
Sources:Amigo / QuickGO
Orthologs
Databases	NCBI: entry; OMA: entry
Species	Human	Mouse
Entrez	3223	15425
Ensembl	ENSG00000197757	ENSMUSG00000001661
UniProt	P09630	P10629
RefSeq (mRNA)	NM_153693; NM_004503	NM_010465
RefSeq (protein)	NP_004494; NP_710160	NP_034595
Location (UCSC)	Chr 12: 53.99 – 54.03 Mb	Chr 15: 102.91 – 102.92 Mb
PubMed search
- Wikidata
View/Edit Human	View/Edit Mouse

Homeobox protein Hox-C6 is a protein that in humans is encoded by the HOXC6 gene. Hox-C6 expression is highest in the fallopian tube and ovary. HoxC6 has been highly expressed in many types of cancers including prostate, breast, and esophageal squamous cell cancer.

== Function ==
This gene belongs to the homeobox family, members of which encode a highly conserved family of transcription factors that play an important role in morphogenesis in all multicellular organisms. Mammals possess four similar homeobox gene clusters, HOXA, HOXB, HOXC and HOXD, which are located on different chromosomes and consist of 9 to 11 genes arranged in tandem. This gene, HOXC6, is one of several HOXC genes located in a cluster on chromosome 12. Three genes, HOXC5, HOXC4 and HOXC6, share a 5' non-coding exon. Transcripts may include the shared exon spliced to the gene-specific exons, or they may include only the gene-specific exons. Alternatively spliced transcript variants encoding different isoforms have been identified for HOXC6. Transcript variant two includes the shared exon, and transcript variant one includes only gene-specific exons. HOXC6 plays a role in lymphoma. The HOXC6 isoform, HOXC6-2 is an active carcinogenic for gastric cancer. It stimulates gastric cancer cells proliferation by acting as an oncogene. Downregulation of this gene's isoforms could potentially lead to less proliferation of certain cancerous cells. With the HOXC6-1 isoform, there were no statistically significant effects on migration, invasion, apoptosis, or proliferation when it was downregulated. According to a study in Cancer Cell International, suppression of the HOXC6 gene plays a role in blocking the TGF-β/SMAD cascade. This then leads to the weakening of epithelial to mesenchymal transition for the cervical carcinoma.

== Knockout model ==
A knockout model using small interfering RNA showed that knockout of HOXC6 was associated with apoptosis. Additionally, the presence of HOXC6 was associated with inhibition of paclitaxel-induced apoptosis. Thus, HOXC6 was demonstrated to induce proliferative activity.

== See also ==
- Homeobox
