= TINF2 =

Protein-coding gene in the species Homo sapiens

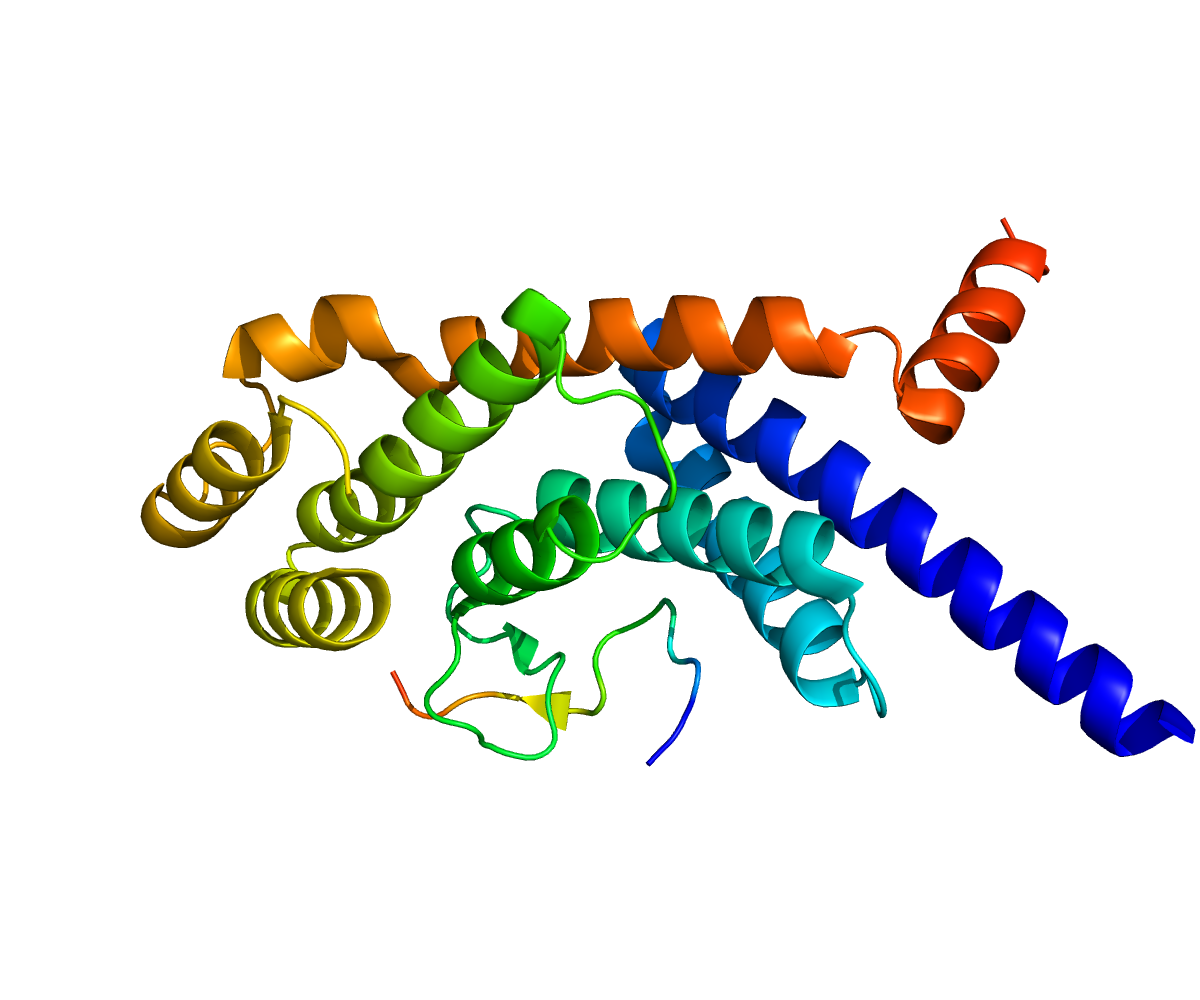
Available structures
PDB	Ortholog search: PDBe RCSB
PDB	List of PDB id codes 3BQO, 3BU8

Identifiers
- Aliases: TINF2, DKCA3, TIN2, TERF1 interacting nuclear factor 2
- External IDs: OMIM: 604319; MGI: 107246; HomoloGene: 8264; GeneCards: TINF2; OMA:TINF2 - orthologs

Gene location (Human)
Chr.	Chromosome 14 (human)
Band	14q12	Start	24,239,643 bp
Band	14q12	End	24,242,674 bp

Gene location (Mouse)
Chr.	Chromosome 14 (mouse)
Band	14 C3|14 28.19 cM	Start	55,912,146 bp
Band	14 C3|14 28.19 cM	End	55,919,277 bp
RNA expression pattern
Bgee	Human / Mouse (ortholog); Top expressed in: granulocyte; right adrenal gland; right adrenal cortex; left adrenal gland; monocyte; left adrenal cortex; bone marrow cells; blood; tonsil; spleen / Top expressed in: primary oocyte; secondary oocyte; primitive streak; zygote; epiblast; seminiferous tubule; spermatocyte; tail of embryo; granulocyte; somite; More reference expression data
BioGPS	n/a
Gene ontology
Molecular function	DNA binding; telomeric DNA binding; protein binding
Cellular component	nuclear telomere cap complex; nuclear matrix; perinucleolar chromocenter; nucleoplasm; chromosome; shelterin complex; telomere; nucleus; nuclear body
Biological process	protein localization to chromosome, telomeric region; negative regulation of epithelial cell proliferation; telomere assembly; negative regulation of protein ADP-ribosylation; telomere capping; negative regulation of telomere maintenance via telomerase; regulation of telomere maintenance via telomere lengthening
Sources:Amigo / QuickGO
Orthologs
Species	Human	Mouse
Entrez	26277	28113
Ensembl	ENSG00000092330; ENSG00000284915	ENSMUSG00000007589
UniProt	Q9BSI4	Q9QXG9; Q8K1K3
RefSeq (mRNA)	NM_001099274; NM_012461; NM_001363668	NM_145705
RefSeq (protein)	NP_001092744; NP_036593; NP_001350597	NP_663751
Location (UCSC)	Chr 14: 24.24 – 24.24 Mb	Chr 14: 55.91 – 55.92 Mb
PubMed search
- Wikidata
View/Edit Human	View/Edit Mouse

TERF1-interacting nuclear factor 2 is a protein that in humans is encoded by the TINF2 gene. TINF2 is a component of the shelterin protein complex found at the end of telomeres.

== Interactions ==
TINF2 has been shown to interact with ACD, POT1 and TERF1.
