= POT1 =

Protein-coding gene in the species Homo sapiens

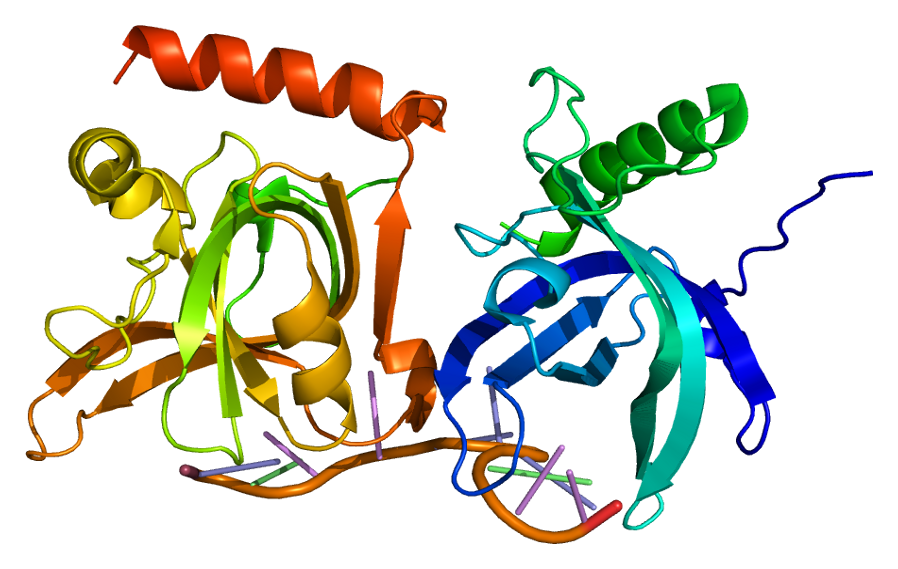
Available structures
PDB	Ortholog search: PDBe RCSB
PDB	List of PDB id codes 1XJV, 3KJO, 3KJP

Identifiers
- Aliases: POT1, CMM10, HGLM9, protection of telomeres 1
- External IDs: OMIM: 606478; MGI: 2141503; HomoloGene: 32263; GeneCards: POT1; OMA:POT1 - orthologs

Gene location (Human)
Chr.	Chromosome 7 (human)
Band	7q31.33	Start	124,822,386 bp
Band	7q31.33	End	124,929,983 bp

Gene location (Mouse)
Chr.	Chromosome 6 (mouse)
Band	6|6 A3.1	Start	25,743,736 bp
Band	6|6 A3.1	End	25,809,245 bp
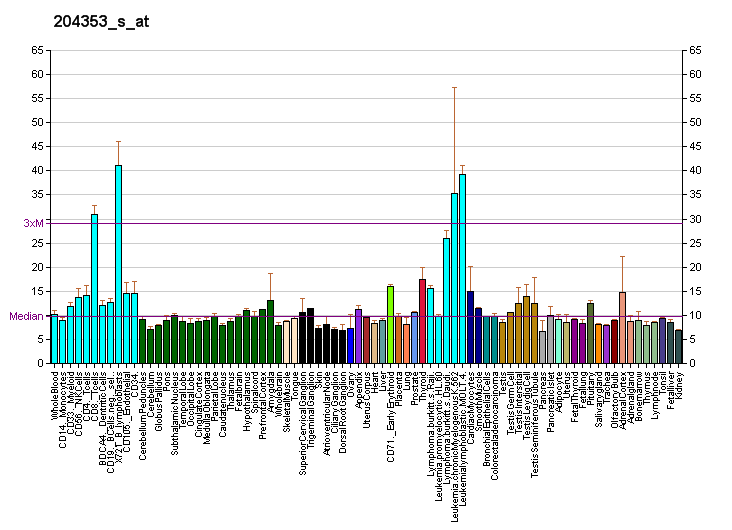

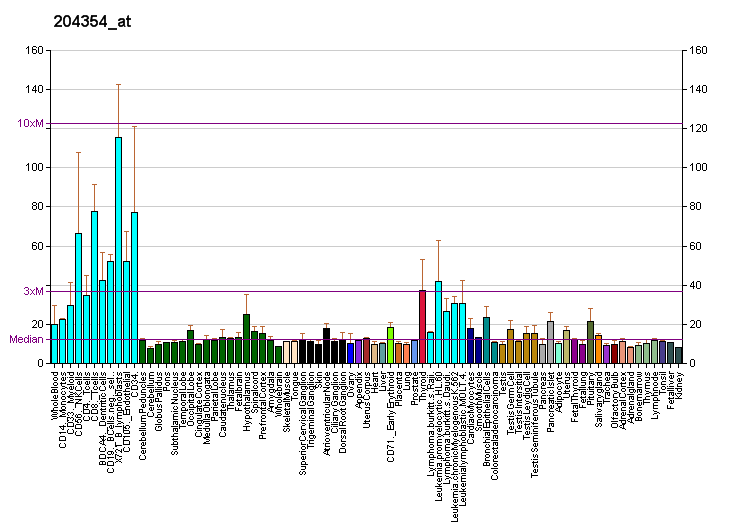
RNA expression pattern
Bgee	Human / Mouse (ortholog); Top expressed in: secondary oocyte; germinal epithelium; Achilles tendon; sperm; Epithelium of choroid plexus; gastric mucosa; gonad; tibia; ventricular zone; retinal pigment epithelium / Top expressed in: genital tubercle; tail of embryo; zygote; cumulus cell; Gonadal ridge; renal corpuscle; ventricular zone; primitive streak; epiblast; thymus; More reference expression data
BioGPS	More reference expression data
Gene ontology
Molecular function	DNA binding; telomeric DNA binding; single-stranded telomeric DNA binding; DEAD/H-box RNA helicase binding; protein binding; G-rich strand telomeric DNA binding; telomerase inhibitor activity; G-rich single-stranded DNA binding; telomeric D-loop binding; telomeric G-quadruplex DNA binding; 8-hydroxy-2'-deoxyguanosine DNA binding
Cellular component	nuclear telomere cap complex; nucleoplasm; chromosome; telomere; nucleus; shelterin complex
Biological process	negative regulation of telomerase activity; DNA duplex unwinding; positive regulation of helicase activity; positive regulation of telomerase activity; establishment of protein localization to telomere; telomere assembly; positive regulation of DNA strand elongation; telomere maintenance; telomere capping; regulation of DNA helicase activity; positive regulation of DNA helicase activity; telomeric D-loop disassembly; telomere maintenance via telomerase; regulation of telomere maintenance via telomerase; negative regulation of telomere maintenance via telomerase; positive regulation of telomere maintenance via telomerase
Sources:Amigo / QuickGO
Orthologs
Species	Human	Mouse
Entrez	25913	101185
Ensembl	ENSG00000128513	ENSMUSG00000029676
UniProt	Q9NUX5	Q91WC1
RefSeq (mRNA)	NM_001042594; NM_015450	NM_133931
RefSeq (protein)	NP_001036059; NP_056265; NP_001036059.1	NP_598692
Location (UCSC)	Chr 7: 124.82 – 124.93 Mb	Chr 6: 25.74 – 25.81 Mb
PubMed search
- Wikidata
View/Edit Human	View/Edit Mouse

Protection of telomeres protein 1 is a protein that in humans is encoded by the POT1 gene.

== Function ==
This gene is a member of the telombin family and encodes a nuclear protein involved in telomere maintenance. Specifically, this protein functions as a member of a multi-protein complex known as shelterin, that binds to the TTAGGG repeats of telomeres, regulating telomere length and protecting chromosome ends from illegitimate recombination, catastrophic chromosome instability, and abnormal chromosome segregation. Alternatively spliced transcript variants have been described.

The absence of POT1 in mouse embryonic fibroblasts and chicken cells leads to a detrimental DNA damage response on telomeres resulting in telomere dysfunction-induced foci (TIFs). POT1 is required for telomere protection because it allows for telomere inhibition of DNA damage response factors. The protein also serves a role in the regulation of telomerase activity on telomeres. In vitro experiments utilizing human POT1 have shown that reduction in POT1 levels result in the elongation of telomeres.

== Interactions ==
POT1 has been shown to interact with ACD and TINF2.

== Pathology ==
- Increased transcriptional expression of this gene is associated with stomach carcinogenesis and its progression.
- Mutations in this gene have also been associated to the acquisition of the malignant features of chronic lymphocytic leukemia.
- POT1 loss-of-function variants predispose to familial melanoma and glioma.
