= Telomeric repeat-binding factor 2 =

Protein

TERF2
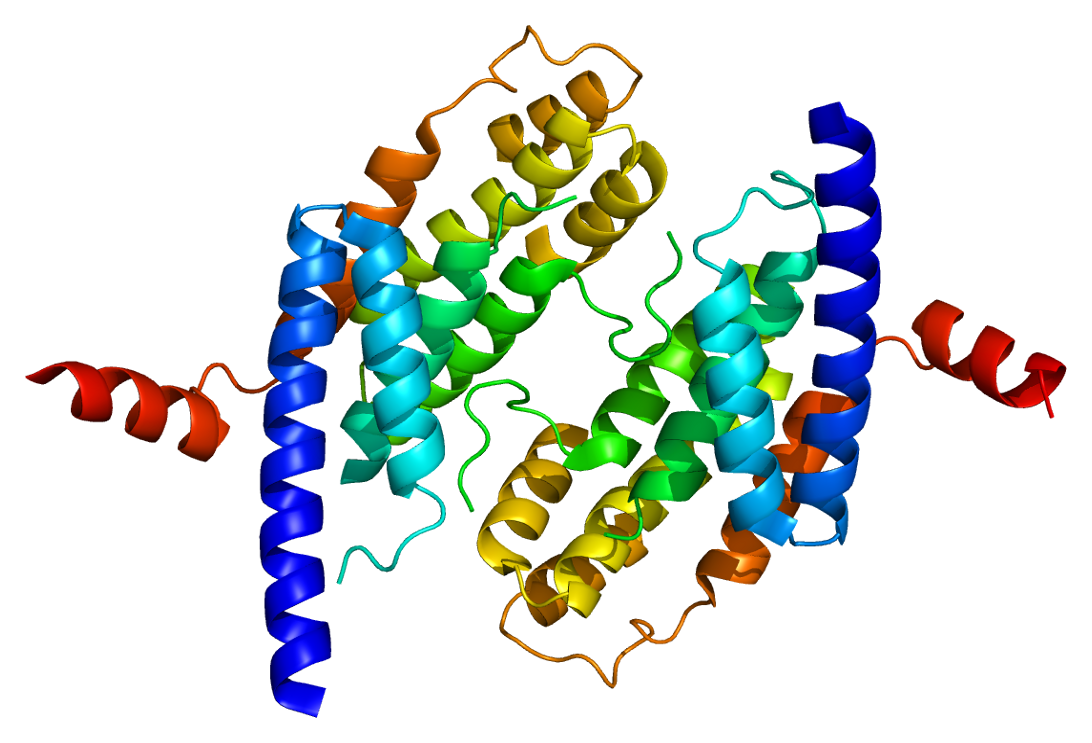

Identifiers
- Aliases: TERF2, TRBF2, TRF2, telomeric repeat binding factor 2
- External IDs: OMIM: 602027; MGI: 1195972; GeneCards: TERF2
Available structures
PDB	Ortholog search: PDBe RCSB
PDB	List of PDB id codes 1H6P, 1VF9, 1VFC, 1W0U, 1XG1, 3BU8, 3BUA, 3K6G, 3SJM, 4M7C, 4RQI

Gene location (Human)
Chr.	Chromosome 16 (human)
Band	16q22.1	Start	69,355,567 bp
Band	16q22.1	End	69,408,571 bp

Gene location (Mouse)
Chr.	Chromosome 8 (mouse)
Band	8 D3|8 53.59 cM	Start	107,069,400 bp
Band	8 D3|8 53.59 cM	End	107,096,547 bp
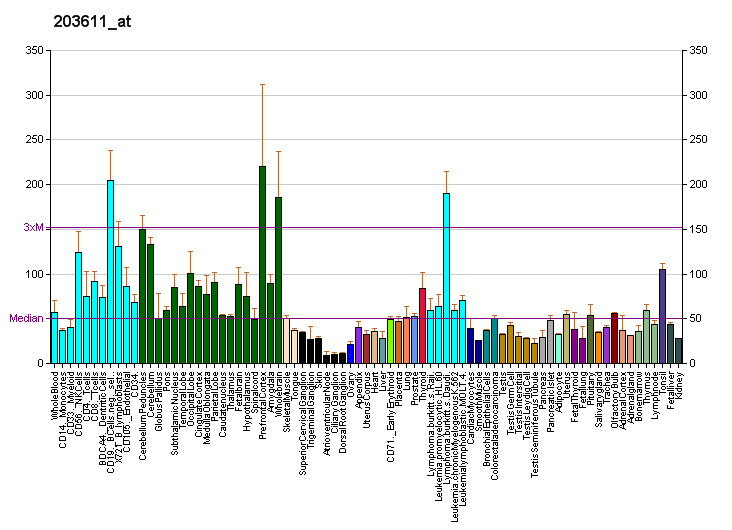
RNA expression pattern
Bgee	Human / Mouse (ortholog); Top expressed in: Brodmann area 46; sural nerve; ventricular zone; ganglionic eminence; postcentral gyrus; epithelium of colon; orbitofrontal cortex; testicle; prefrontal cortex; gastrocnemius muscle / Top expressed in: tail of embryo; genital tubercle; internal carotid artery; external carotid artery; zygote; Rostral migratory stream; retinal pigment epithelium; ciliary body; secondary oocyte; thymus; More reference expression data
BioGPS	More reference expression data
Gene ontology
Molecular function	DNA binding; double-stranded telomeric DNA binding; protein homodimerization activity; telomeric DNA binding; telomerase activity; protein C-terminus binding; protein binding; G-rich strand telomeric DNA binding; enzyme binding; protein-containing complex binding; DNA-binding transcription factor activity, RNA polymerase II-specific
Cellular component	nuclear telomere cap complex; chromosome; telomere; Mre11 complex; nucleus; nucleoplasm; nuclear body; shelterin complex; axon cytoplasm
Biological process	negative regulation of telomere single strand break repair; regulation of telomere maintenance; negative regulation of telomere maintenance via semi-conservative replication; negative regulation of gene expression; negative regulation of beta-galactosidase activity; protein localization to chromosome, telomeric region; cellular senescence; negative regulation of telomere capping; positive regulation of gene expression; positive regulation of nitric-oxide synthase activity; negative regulation of t-circle formation; cell cycle; telomeric loop formation; negative regulation of cellular senescence; telomere capping; negative regulation of telomere maintenance via telomere lengthening; negative regulation of exonuclease activity; telomeric D-loop disassembly; negative regulation of telomeric D-loop disassembly; negative regulation of telomere maintenance via recombination; telomere maintenance; RNA-dependent DNA biosynthetic process; negative regulation of telomere maintenance; regulation of telomere maintenance via telomerase; negative regulation of telomere maintenance via telomerase; protection from non-homologous end joining at telomere; regulation of transcription by RNA polymerase II; anterograde axonal transport of messenger ribonucleoprotein complex
Sources:Amigo / QuickGO
Orthologs
Databases	NCBI: entry; OMA: entry
Species	Human	Mouse
Entrez	7014	21750
Ensembl	ENSG00000132604	ENSMUSG00000031921
UniProt	Q15554	O35144
RefSeq (mRNA)	NM_005652	NM_001083118; NM_001286200; NM_009353
RefSeq (protein)	NP_005643	NP_001076587; NP_001273129; NP_033379; NP_001357994; NP_001357995 NP_001357996
Location (UCSC)	Chr 16: 69.36 – 69.41 Mb	Chr 8: 107.07 – 107.1 Mb
PubMed search
- Wikidata
View/Edit Human	View/Edit Mouse

Telomeric repeat-binding factor 2 is a protein that is present at telomeres throughout the cell cycle. It is also known as TERF2, TRF2, and TRBF2, and is encoded in humans by the TERF2 gene. It is a component of the shelterin nucleoprotein complex and a second negative regulator of telomere length, playing a key role in the protective activity of telomeres. It was first reported in 1997 in the lab of Titia de Lange, where a DNA sequence similar, but not identical, to TERF1 was discovered, with respect to the Myb-domain. De Lange isolated the new Myb-containing protein sequence and called it TERF2.

== Structure and domains ==
TERF2 has a similar structure to that of TERF1. Both proteins carry a C-terminus Myb motif and large TERF1-related dimerization domains near their N-terminus. However, both proteins exist exclusively as homodimers and do not heterodimerize with each other, as proven by co-immunoprecipitation assay analysis. Also, TERF2 has a basic N-terminus, differing from TERF1’s acidic N-terminus, and was found to be much more conserved, suggesting that the two proteins have distinct functions.

There are 4 domain categories on the TERF2 protein that allow it to bind to both other proteins in the shelterin protein complex, and to specific types of DNA.

=== TERF homology domain ===
The TERF Homology Domain (TRFH; InterPro: IPR013867) is an area that helps to promote homodimerization of TERF2 with itself. This results in the formation of a quaternary structure that is characteristic of this protein. This TRFH domain also allows TERF2 to bind to and act as a dock for many other types of proteins. The Apollo nuclease, a shelterin accessory factor, uses the TRFH domain as a dock. The recruitment of Apollo by TERF2 allows for telomeric ends formed by DNA synthesis to be processed. By doing so, the telomere ends are able to avoid ATM kinase activation through the creation of a terminal structure. SLX4, which is important in DNA repair by acting as a scaffold for structure-specific DNA repair nucleases, also binds to the TRFH domain of TERF2. The TRFH domain is responsible for other binding events, including RTEL1, and proteins that contain a TBD site.

=== Myb domain ===
The Myb domain (InterPro: IPR017930) acts by binding to double-stranded telomeric DNA. This region gets its name from a viral protein called Myb derived from the avian myeloblastosis virus. Specifically, the sequence that this Myb domain targets on the DNA is (GGTTAG/CCAATC)n.

=== Basic and hinge domains ===
Two other domains also work to bind and influence the activity of proteins associated with the TERF2 protein. Both are unique to TERF2. The basic domain sits at the N-terminal, and has two main functions: the prevention of t-loop excision by XRCC3, and the inhibition of SLX4. The final domain of TERF2 is called the hinge domain (InterPro: IPR031902). This domain contains a motif for binding the shelterin protein TIN2, which acts as a stabilizing protein, connecting units that are attached to double stranded and single stranded DNA. This domain also is responsible for binding to RAP1, and helps to inhibit RNF168 recruitment at telomeres.

== Function ==
This protein is present at telomeres in metaphase of the cell cycle, is a second negative regulator of telomere length, and plays a key role in the protective activity of telomeres. While having similar telomere binding activity and domain organization, TERF2 differs from TERF1 in that its N terminus is basic rather than acidic.

=== T-Loop formation ===
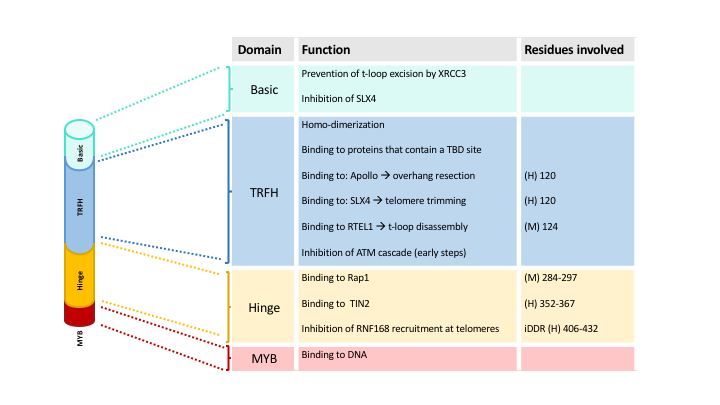
Specific domains on the TERF2 protein sequence and their functionalities.

Telomeric ends are structurally similar to double-stranded breaks on the chromosome. To prevent the cellular DNA repair machinery from mistakenly identifying telomeres as chromosome breaks, t-loops are formed in which the 3’ TTAGGG overhang of the telomere loops back into the DNA duplex. TERF2 promotes t-loop formation by preferentially binding to a telomeric double-stranded DNA duplex containing a 3’ TTAGGG single-stranded overhang. If the 3’ TTAGGG overhang is not present, TERF2 will not bind. Once bound, it migrates to the t-loop junction where the single-stranded overhang invades the double-stranded region upstream. No other shelterin protein has been shown to promote this process but interaction of TERF2 with TERF2IP is shown to promote higher t-loop formation in vitro. Studies have demonstrated that deletion of TERF2 prevents t-loop formation, leading to excessive loss of telomeric DNA and early cell death.

=== ATM kinase prevention ===
TERF2 plays a central role in preventing ATM kinase DNA damage response. It binds telomeric dsDNA and prevents telomeres from activating ATM kinase. This interaction of TERF2 with ATM is believed to be relevant to the mechanism by which TERF2 blocks ATM signaling. Because of its oligomeric nature, TERF2 could potentially cross-link ATM monomers and hold the kinase in its inactive dimeric state, thereby blocking amplification of the ATM signal at an early step in its activation. However, because mutations in the TERF2 dimerization domain destabilize the protein, it has not been possible to test the contribution of TERF2 oligomerization on ATM repression directly. Removal of TERF2 induces ATM-dependent apoptosis by localizing the active, phosphorylated form of ATM to unprotected chromosome ends. Since TERF2 specifically binds at telomeres and remains there when DNA damage is induced, it is unlikely to interfere with activation of the ATM kinase at different sites of DNA damage. Therefore, TERF2 could act as a telomere-specific inhibitor of ATM kinase.

=== TERF2 Knockout Effects ===
Conditional deletion of TERF2 in mice cells effectively removes the shelterin nucleoprotein complex. As a result of removing this complex, several unwanted DNA damage response pathways are activated, including ATM kinase signaling, ATR kinase signaling, non-homologous end-joining (NHEJ), alt-NHEJ, C-NHEJ, 5' resection, and homology directed repair (HDR). These repair pathways (in the presence of P53 knockout and Cre) often contribute to the phenotype where chromosome ends are connected to each other in a very long chain, which can be visualized by a combination of a DAPI stain and fluorescence in situ hybridization (FISH) technique.

== Interactions ==
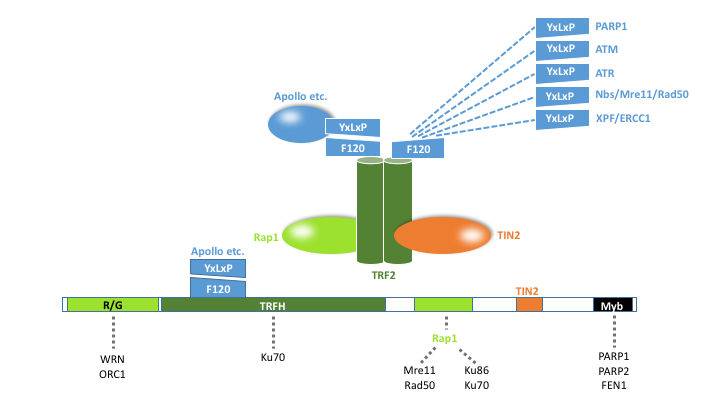
Client proteins have a distinctive YxLxP motif (where "x" can be any amino acid) that bind to TERF2.

TERF2 is also known to recruit certain client proteins, also known as accessory factors. These client proteins are often recruited to TERF2 for a specific function at a specific time, often temporarily. The TRFH domain contains a F120 residue, which is the binding site of TERF2 where it recruits client proteins. These client proteins also contain a TRFH binding motif, which consists of a conserved 6-amino acid sequence of the following formula: YxLxP, where "x" can be any amino acid substituted. The above-mentioned Apollo nuclease (one of many TERF2's client proteins) also contains the formulaic motif; its specific motif sequence is YLLTP.

TERF1 also demonstrates similar client protein recruitment mechanism as TERF2, except that it diverges at two concepts: 1) the TRFH of TERF1 contains a F142 residue, 2) the client proteins specific for TERF1 contain the TRFH binding motif sequence of FxLxP, where the amino acid Y (tyrosine) is replaced with F (phenylalanine).

TERF2 has also been shown to interact with:

- Ku70,
- MRE11A,
- Nibrin and
- Rad50,
- RE1-silencing transcription factor,
- TERF2IP,
- Werner syndrome ATP-dependent helicase.

== Disease relevance of TERF2 ==
=== Cancer ===
Telomerase is an enzyme that works to create telomeric ends for DNA, and it is thought to play important roles in the development of cancer. Specifically, telomeric stability is known to be a common occurrence in cancer cells. Along with the telomerase, the shelterin complex, and TERF2 and TERF1 specifically, also have been noted to control the lengths of telomeres formed by these telomerases. Shelterin works to protect telomeres against unsuitable activation of the DNA damage response pathway, as noted in the function section above. TERF2 as part of the shelterin complex, has been known to block the ATM signaling pathways and prevent chromosome end fusion. In cancer cells, TERF2 phosphorylation by extracellular signal-regulated kinase (ERK1/2) is a controlling factor in the major pro-oncogenic signaling pathways (RAS/RAF/MEK/ERK) that affect telomeric stability. Additionally, when TERF2 was non-phosphorylated in melanoma cells, there was a cell induced DNA damage response, arresting growth and causing tumor reversion. Studies have found that in tumor cells, TERF2 levels are observed to be high, and this raised level of TERF2 contributes to oncogenesis in a variety of ways. This high level of TERF2 decreases the ability to recruit and activate natural killer cells in human tumor cells. One study used a dominant negative form of TERF2^{ΔBΔC}, to inhibit TERF2, and found that it could induce a reversion malignant phenotype in human melanoma cells. Therefore, over-expression of TERF2^{ΔBΔC}, causing blocking of TERF2, induced apoptosis and reduced tumourigenicity in certain cell lines. Additionally, upregulation of TERF2 may be the cause of the establishment and maintenance of short telomeres. These short telomeres increase chromosomal instability, and increase the chances of certain cancers progressing in the body, such as with leukemia. In gastric mucosa tissues, the expression of TERF2 proteins was significantly higher than normal, and this over-expression of TERF2, along with over-expression of TERF1, TIN2, TERT, and BRCA1 protein transposition, may cause a reduction in telomere length, further contributing to multistage carcinogenesis of gastric cancer.
