= TERF2IP =

Protein-coding gene in the species Homo sapiens

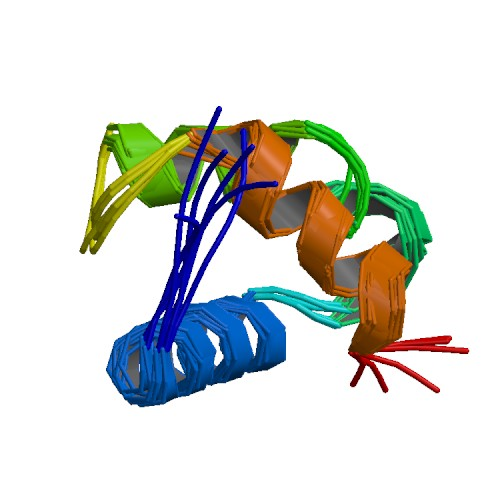
Available structures
| PDB | Ortholog search: PDBe RCSB |
| PDB | List of PDB id codes 1FEX, 3K6G, 4RQI |

Identifiers
- Aliases: TERF2IP, DRIP5, RAP1, TERF2 interacting protein
- External IDs: OMIM: 605061; MGI: 1929871; HomoloGene: 10357; GeneCards: TERF2IP; OMA:TERF2IP - orthologs

Gene location (Human)
| Chr. | Chromosome 16 (human) |
| Band | 16q23.1 | Start | 75,647,773 bp |
| Band | 16q23.1 | End | 75,761,872 bp |

Gene location (Mouse)
| Chr. | Chromosome 8 (mouse) |
| Band | 8|8 E1 | Start | 112,738,030 bp |
| Band | 8|8 E1 | End | 112,747,160 bp |
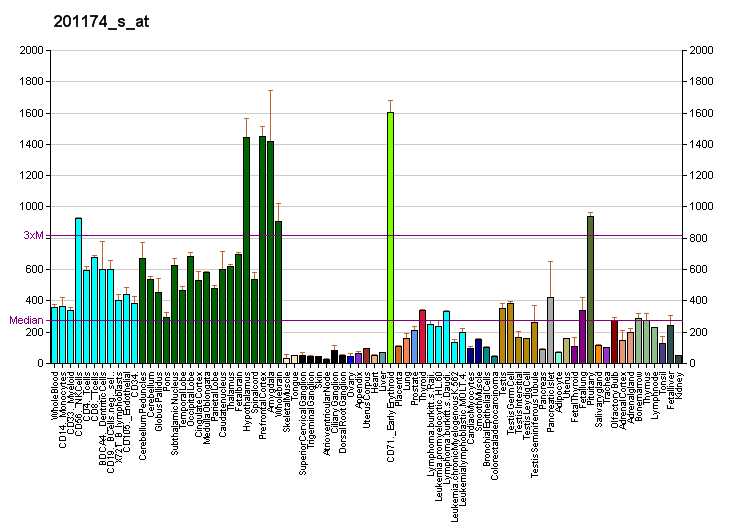
RNA expression pattern
| Bgee | Human / Mouse (ortholog); Top expressed in: middle temporal gyrus; Brodmann area 23; pars compacta; pars reticulata; superior vestibular nucleus; pons; internal globus pallidus; lateral nuclear group of thalamus; Brodmann area 9; superior frontal gyrus / Top expressed in: ventromedial nucleus; supraoptic nucleus; paraventricular nucleus of hypothalamus; dorsomedial hypothalamic nucleus; lateral hypothalamus; lumbar subsegment of spinal cord; ventral tegmental area; arcuate nucleus; dorsal tegmental nucleus; mammillary body; More reference expression data |
| BioGPS | More reference expression data |
Gene ontology
| Molecular function | DNA binding; telomeric DNA binding; protein binding; G-rich strand telomeric DNA binding; phosphatase binding |
| Cellular component | nuclear telomere cap complex; nuclear envelope; chromosome; shelterin complex; telomere; nuclear chromosome; Mre11 complex; nucleus; nucleoplasm; cytosol; nuclear body; cytoplasm |
| Biological process | negative regulation of DNA recombination at telomere; telomere maintenance via telomerase; protection from non-homologous end joining at telomere; regulation of double-strand break repair via homologous recombination; transcription, DNA-templated; positive regulation of peptidyl-serine phosphorylation; protein localization to chromosome, telomeric region; positive regulation of protein acetylation; telomere maintenance via telomere lengthening; positive regulation of NF-kappaB transcription factor activity; positive regulation of I-kappaB kinase/NF-kappaB signaling; telomere maintenance; telomere capping; negative regulation of protein phosphorylation; regulation of transcription, DNA-templated; regulation of telomere maintenance; negative regulation of telomere maintenance; positive regulation of NIK/NF-kappaB signaling |
Sources:Amigo / QuickGO
Orthologs
| Species | Human | Mouse |
| Entrez | 54386 | 57321 |
| Ensembl | ENSG00000166848 | ENSMUSG00000033430 |
| UniProt | Q9NYB0 | Q91VL8 |
| RefSeq (mRNA) | NM_018975 | NM_020584 |
| RefSeq (protein) | NP_061848 | NP_065609 |
| Location (UCSC) | Chr 16: 75.65 – 75.76 Mb | Chr 8: 112.74 – 112.75 Mb |
| PubMed search |
- Wikidata
| View/Edit Human | View/Edit Mouse |

Telomeric repeat-binding factor 2-interacting protein 1 also known as repressor activator protein 1 (Rap1) is a protein that in humans is encoded by the TERF2IP gene.

== Interactions ==
TERF2IP has been shown to interact with Ku80, Rad50 and TERF2. Upon interaction, TERF2IP/TERF2 complex has been shown to bind to telomeric junction sites with higher affinity
