= Telomere =

Region of repetitive nucleotide sequences on chromosomes

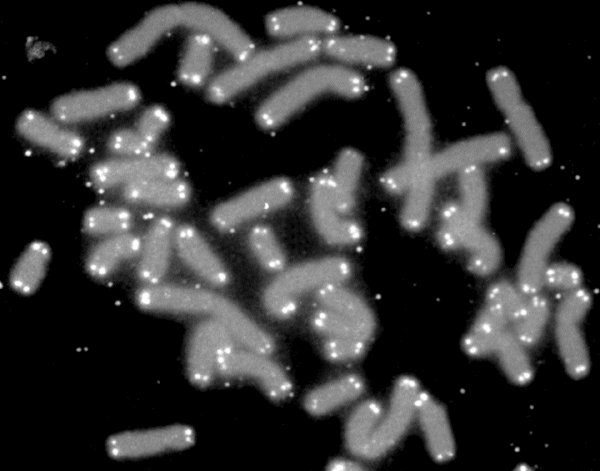
Human chromosomes (grey) capped by telomeres (white)

A telomere (/ˈtɛləmɪər, ˈtiːlə-/; from Ancient Greek τέλος (télos) 'end' and μέρος (méros) 'part') is a region of repetitive nucleotide sequences associated with specialized proteins at the ends of linear chromosomes (see Sequences). Telomeres are a widespread genetic feature most commonly found in eukaryotes. In most or even all species possessing them, they protect the terminal regions of chromosomal DNA from progressive degradation and ensure the integrity of linear chromosomes by preventing DNA repair systems from mistaking the very ends of the DNA strand for a double-strand break.

== Discovery ==
The existence of a special structure at the ends of chromosomes was independently proposed in 1938 by Hermann Joseph Muller, studying the fruit fly Drosophila melanogaster, and in 1939 by Barbara McClintock, working with maize. Painter and Muller determined during 1929 two alternative possibilities for the order of chromosome rearrangement, the latter termed the "breakage-first hypothesis". Muller inferred from this hypothesis that for the continued operation of a broken ended chromosome, in radiation damaged chromosome of D. melanogaster, the function of the terminal gene was to seal the break. He termed this gene a "telomere", from the Greek telos (end) and meros (part).

In the early 1970s, Soviet theorist Alexey Olovnikov first recognized that chromosomes could not completely replicate their ends; this is known as the "end replication problem". Building on this, and accommodating Leonard Hayflick's idea of limited somatic cell division, Olovnikov suggested that DNA sequences are lost every time a cell replicates until the loss reaches a critical level, at which point cell division ends. According to his theory of marginotomy, DNA sequences at the ends of telomeres are represented by tandem repeats, which create a buffer that determines the number of divisions that a certain cell clone can undergo. Furthermore, it was predicted that a specialized DNA polymerase (originally called a tandem-DNA-polymerase) could extend telomeres in immortal tissues such as germline, cancer cells and stem cells. It also followed from this hypothesis that organisms with circular genome, such as bacteria, do not have the end replication problem and therefore do not age.

Olovnikov suggested that in cells of vegetatively propagated organisms, germline, and immortal cell populations (e.g., cancer cells), an enzyme might be activated to prevent the shortening of DNA termini with each cell division.

In 1975–1977, Elizabeth Blackburn, working as a postdoctoral fellow at Yale University with Joseph G. Gall, discovered the unusual nature of telomeres, with their simple repeated DNA sequences composing chromosome ends. Blackburn, Carol Greider, and Jack Szostak were awarded the 2009 Nobel Prize in Physiology or Medicine for the discovery of how chromosomes are protected by telomeres and the enzyme telomerase.

== Structure and function ==
=== End replication problem ===
Lagging strand during DNA replication

During DNA replication, DNA polymerase cannot replicate the sequences present at the 3' ends of the parent strands. This is a consequence of its unidirectional mode of DNA synthesis: it can only attach new nucleotides to an existing 3'-end (that is, synthesis progresses 5'-3') and thus it requires a primer to initiate replication. On the leading strand (oriented 5'-3' within the replication fork), DNA-polymerase continuously replicates from the point of initiation all the way to the strand's end with the primer (made of RNA) then being excised and substituted by DNA. The lagging strand, however, is oriented 3'-5' with respect to the replication fork so continuous replication by DNA-polymerase is impossible, which necessitates discontinuous replication involving the repeated synthesis of primers further 5' of the site of initiation (see lagging strand replication). The last primer to be involved in lagging-strand replication sits near the 3'-end of the template (corresponding to the potential 5'-end of the lagging-strand). Originally it was believed that the last primer would sit at the very end of the template, thus, once removed, the DNA-polymerase that substitutes primers with DNA (DNA-Pol δ in eukaryotes) (Note: During replication, multiple DNA-polymerases are involved.) would be unable to synthesize the "replacement DNA" from the 5'-end of the lagging strand so that the template nucleotides previously paired to the last primer would not be replicated. It has since been questioned whether the last lagging strand primer is placed exactly at the 3'-end of the template and it was demonstrated that it is rather synthesized at a distance of about 70–100 nucleotides which is consistent with the finding that DNA in cultured human cell is shortened by 50–100 base pairs per cell division.

If coding sequences are degraded in this process, potentially vital genetic information would be lost. Telomeres are non-coding, repetitive sequences located at the termini of linear chromosomes to act as buffers for those coding sequences further behind. They "cap" the end-sequences and are progressively degraded in the process of DNA replication.

The "end replication problem" is exclusive to linear chromosomes as circular chromosomes do not have ends lying without reach of DNA-polymerases. Most prokaryotes, relying on circular chromosomes, accordingly do not possess telomeres. A small fraction of bacterial chromosomes (such as those in Streptomyces, Agrobacterium, and Borrelia), however, are linear and possess telomeres, which are very different from those of the eukaryotic chromosomes in structure and function. The known structures of bacterial telomeres take the form of proteins bound to the ends of linear chromosomes, or hairpin loops of single-stranded DNA at the ends of the linear chromosomes.

=== Telomere ends and shelterin ===
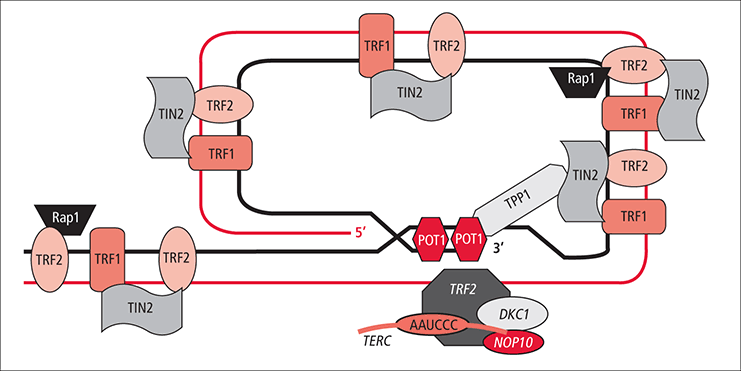
Shelterin co-ordinates the T-loop formation of telomeres.

At the very 3'-end of the telomere there is a 300 base pair overhang which can invade the double-stranded portion of the telomere forming a structure known as a T-loop. This loop is analogous to a knot, which stabilizes the telomere, and prevents the telomere ends from being recognized as breakpoints by the DNA repair machinery. Should non-homologous end joining occur at the telomeric ends, chromosomal fusion would result. The T-loop is maintained by several proteins, collectively referred to as the shelterin complex. In humans, the shelterin complex consists of six proteins identified as TRF1, TRF2, TIN2, POT1, TPP1, and RAP1. In many species, the sequence repeats are enriched in guanine, e.g. TTAGGG in vertebrates, which allows the formation of G-quadruplexes, a special conformation of DNA involving non-Watson-Crick base pairing. There are different subtypes depending on the involvement of single- or double-stranded DNA, among other things. There is evidence for the 3'-overhang in ciliates (that possess telomere repeats similar to those found in vertebrates) to form such G-quadruplexes that accommodate it, rather than a T-loop. G-quadruplexes present an obstacle for enzymes such as DNA-polymerases and are thus thought to be involved in the regulation of replication and transcription.

=== Telomerase ===
Synthesis of chromosome ends by telomerase

Many organisms have a ribonucleoprotein enzyme called telomerase, which carries out the task of adding repetitive nucleotide sequences to the ends of the DNA. Telomerase "replenishes" the telomere "cap". In most multicellular eukaryotic organisms, telomerase is active only in germ cells, some types of stem cells such as embryonic stem cells, and certain white blood cells. Telomerase can be reactivated and telomeres reset back to an embryonic state by somatic cell nuclear transfer. The steady shortening of telomeres with each replication in somatic (body) cells may have a role in senescence and in the prevention of cancer. This is because the telomeres act as a sort of time-delay "fuse", eventually running out after a certain number of cell divisions and resulting in the eventual loss of vital genetic information from the cell's chromosome with future divisions.

=== Length ===
Telomere length varies greatly between species, from approximately 300 base pairs in yeast to many kilobases in humans, and usually is composed of arrays of guanine-rich, six- to eight-base-pair-long repeats. Eukaryotic telomeres normally terminate with 3′ single-stranded-DNA overhang ranging from 75 to 300 bases, which is essential for telomere maintenance and capping. Multiple proteins binding single- and double-stranded telomere DNA have been identified. These function in both telomere maintenance and capping. Telomeres form large loop structures called telomere loops, or T-loops. Here, the single-stranded DNA curls around in a long circle, stabilized by telomere-binding proteins. At the very end of the T-loop, the single-stranded telomere DNA is held onto a region of double-stranded DNA by the telomere strand disrupting the double-helical DNA, and base pairing to one of the two strands. This triple-stranded structure is called a displacement loop or D-loop. A recent 2025 study suggest individuals with higher vitamin D intake may experience a slower rate of cellular aging. The study found that vitamin D supplements could help reduce this shortening, potentially by lowering inflammation. However, scientists caution that vitamin D is not a universal remedy, as it does not appear to impact all chronic illnesses.

== Shortening ==
=== Oxidative damage ===
Apart from the end replication problem, in vitro studies have shown that telomeres accumulate damage due to oxidative stress and that oxidative stress-mediated DNA damage has a major influence on telomere shortening in vivo. There is a multitude of ways in which oxidative stress, mediated by reactive oxygen species (ROS), can lead to DNA damage; however, it is yet unclear whether the elevated rate in telomeres is brought about by their inherent susceptibility or a diminished activity of DNA repair systems in these regions. Despite widespread agreement of the findings, widespread flaws regarding measurement and sampling have been pointed out; for example, a suspected species and tissue dependency of oxidative damage to telomeres is said to be insufficiently accounted for. Population-based studies have indicated an interaction between anti-oxidant intake and telomere length. In the Long Island Breast Cancer Study Project (LIBCSP), authors found a moderate increase in breast cancer risk among women with the shortest telomeres and lower dietary intake of beta carotene, vitamin C or E. These results suggest that cancer risk due to telomere shortening may interact with other mechanisms of DNA damage, specifically oxidative stress.

=== Association with aging ===
Although telomeres shorten during the lifetime of an individual, it is telomere shortening-rate rather than telomere length that is associated with the human lifespan. Critically short telomeres trigger a DNA damage response and cellular senescence. Mice have much longer telomeres, but a greatly accelerated telomere shortening-rate and greatly reduced lifespan compared to humans and elephants.

Telomere shortening is associated with aging, mortality, and aging-related diseases in experimental animals. Although many factors can affect human lifespan, such as smoking, diet, and exercise, as persons approach the upper limit of human life expectancy, longer telomeres may be associated with lifespan. However, vitamin D3 supplementation has been shown to significantly reduce telomere shortening over four years compared to a placebo, thus preventing nearly three years' worth of cellular aging, which may help offset telomere truncation over time.

=== Potential effect of psychological stress ===
Meta-analyses found that increased perceived psychological stress was associated with a small decrease in telomere length—but that these associations attenuate to no significant association when accounting for publication bias. The literature concerning telomeres as integrative biomarkers of exposure to stress and adversity is dominated by cross-sectional and correlational studies, which makes causal interpretation problematic. A 2020 review argued that the relationship between psychosocial stress and telomere length appears strongest for stress experienced in utero or early life.

== Lengthening ==
The average cell will divide between 50 and 70 times before cell death. As the cell divides the telomeres on the end of the chromosome get smaller. The Hayflick limit is the theoretical limit to the number of times a cell may divide until the telomere becomes so short that division is inhibited and the cell enters senescence.

The phenomenon of limited cellular division was first observed by Leonard Hayflick, and is now referred to as the Hayflick limit. Significant discoveries were subsequently made by a group of scientists organized at Geron Corporation by Geron's founder Michael D. West, that tied telomere shortening with the Hayflick limit. The cloning of the catalytic component of telomerase enabled experiments to test whether the expression of telomerase at levels sufficient to prevent telomere shortening was capable of immortalizing human cells. Telomerase was demonstrated in a 1998 publication in Science to be capable of extending cell lifespan, and now is well-recognized as capable of immortalizing human somatic cells.

Two studies on long-lived seabirds demonstrate that the role of telomeres is far from being understood. In 2003, scientists observed that the telomeres of Leach's storm petrel (Oceanodroma leucorhoa) seem to lengthen with chronological age, the first observed instance of such behaviour of telomeres.

A study reported that telomere length of different mammalian species correlates inversely rather than directly with lifespan, and concluded that the contribution of telomere length to lifespan remains controversial. There is little evidence that, in humans, telomere length is a significant biomarker of normal aging with respect to important cognitive and physical abilities.

== Sequences ==
Experimentally verified and predicted telomere sequence motifs from more than 9000 species are collected in research community curated database TeloBase. Some of the experimentally verified telomere nucleotide sequences are also listed in Telomerase Database website (see nucleic acid notation for letter representations).

Some known telomere nucleotide sequences
Group	Organism	Telomeric repeat (5' to 3' toward the end)
Vertebrates	Human, mouse, Xenopus	TTAGGG
Filamentous fungi	Neurospora crassa	TTAGGG
Slime moulds	Physarum, Didymium	TTAGGG
Slime moulds	Dictyostelium	AG(1-8)
Kinetoplastid protozoa	Trypanosoma, Crithidia	TTAGGG
Ciliate protozoa	Tetrahymena, Glaucoma	TTGGGG
Ciliate protozoa	Paramecium	TTGGG(T/G)
Ciliate protozoa	Oxytricha, Stylonychia, Euplotes	TTTTGGGG
Apicomplexan protozoa	Plasmodium	TTAGGG(T/C)
Higher plants	Arabidopsis thaliana	TTTAGGG
Higher plants	Cestrum elegans	TTTTTTAGGG
Higher plants	Allium	CTCGGTTATGGG
Higher plants	Green algae Chlamydomonas	TTTTAGGG
Insects	Bombyx mori	TTAGG
Insects	Bombus terrestris	TTAGGTTGGGG
Insects	Vespula vulgaris	TTGCGTCTGGG
Roundworms	Ascaris lumbricoides	TTAGGC
Fission yeasts	Schizosaccharomyces pombe	TTAC(A)(C)G(1-8)
Budding yeasts	Saccharomyces cerevisiae	TGTGGGTGTGGTG (from RNA template) or G(2-3)(TG)(1-6)T (consensus)
Budding yeasts	Saccharomyces castellii	TCTGGGTG
Budding yeasts	Candida glabrata	GGGGTCTGGGTGCTG
Budding yeasts	Candida albicans	GGTGTACGGATGTCTAACTTCTT
Budding yeasts	Candida tropicalis	GGTGTA[C/A]GGATGTCACGATCATT
Budding yeasts	Candida maltosa	GGTGTACGGATGCAGACTCGCTT
Budding yeasts	Candida guillermondii	GGTGTAC
Budding yeasts	Candida pseudotropicalis	GGTGTACGGATTTGATTAGTTATGT
Budding yeasts	Kluyveromyces lactis	GGTGTACGGATTTGATTAGGTATGT

== Research on disease risk ==
Disease risk in aging may be associated with telomere shortening, senescent cells, or SASP (senescence-associated secretory phenotype). Each time a cell divides, its telomeres shorten. After enough divisions, the telomeres are absent and the cell cannot divide, leading to senescence. Senescent cells are associated with aging, cancer and other ailments.

== Measurement ==
Several techniques are currently employed to assess average telomere length in eukaryotic cells. One method is the Terminal Restriction Fragment (TRF) southern blot. There is a Web-based Analyser of the Length of Telomeres (WALTER), software processing the TRF pictures. A Real-Time PCR assay for telomere length involves determining the Telomere-to-Single Copy Gene (T/S) ratio, which is demonstrated to be proportional to the average telomere length in a cell.

Tools have also been developed to estimate the length of telomere from whole genome sequencing (WGS) experiments. Amongst these are TelSeq, Telomerecat and telomereHunter. Length estimation from WGS typically works by differentiating telomere sequencing reads and then inferring the length of telomere that produced that number of reads. These methods have been shown to correlate with preexisting methods of estimation such as PCR and TRF. Flow-FISH is used to quantify the length of telomeres in human white blood cells. A semi-automated method for measuring the average length of telomeres with Flow FISH was published in Nature Protocols in 2006.

While multiple companies offer telomere length measurement services, the utility of these measurements for widespread clinical or personal use has been questioned. Nobel Prize winner Elizabeth Blackburn, who was co-founder of one company, promoted the clinical utility of telomere length measures.

== In wildlife ==
During the last three decades, eco-evolutionary studies have investigated the relevance of life-history traits and environmental conditions on telomeres of wildlife. Most of these studies have been conducted in endotherms, i.e. birds and mammals. They have provided evidence for the inheritance of telomere length; however, heritability estimates vary greatly within and among species. Age and telomere length often negatively correlate in vertebrates, but this decline is variable among taxa and is influenced by the method used for estimating telomere length. In contrast, the available information shows no sex differences in telomere length across vertebrates. Phylogeny and life history traits such as body size or the pace of life can also affect telomere dynamics. For example, it has been described across species of birds and mammals. A meta-analysis has confirmed that exposure to various stressors (e.g. pathogen infection, competition, reproductive effort and high activity level) was associated with shorter telomeres across different animal taxa.

Studies on ectotherms, and other non-mammalian organisms, show that there is no single universal model of telomere erosion; rather, there is wide variation in relevant dynamics across Metazoa, and even within smaller taxonomic groups these patterns appear diverse.

== See also ==
- Epigenetic clock
- Centromere
- DNA damage theory of aging
- Immortality
- Maximum life span
- Rejuvenation (aging)
- Senescence, biological aging
- Tankyrase
- Telomere-binding protein
- G-quartet
- Immortal DNA strand hypothesis
