= Sierra Sciences =

US biotechnology company

Sierra Sciences, LLC
- Type: Privately held
- Industry: Biotechnology
- Founded: 1999; 27 years ago
- Headquarters: Reno, Nevada
- Key people: William H. Andrews: Founder, President and CEO; Richard Offerdahl: Co-Chairman of the Board and COO; Pierluigi Zappacosta: Co-Chairman of the Board and Vice President, Business Development
- Website: sierrasci.com

Sierra Sciences, LLC is a biotechnology company founded by William H. Andrews, former director of molecular biology at Geron Corporation. Andrews founded Sierra Sciences in 1999 in Reno, Nevada, with the goal of preventing and/or reversing cellular senescence, and ultimately curing diseases associated with human aging, including the aging process itself.

== Background ==
In humans, aging is strongly correlated with the length of an individual's telomeres, the repetitive DNA at the ends of each chromosome. Each time a cell in the body divides, its telomeres become shorter. Eventually, telomeres shorten to the point where the cell is unable to divide (the "Hayflick limit"). The enzyme telomerase adds these DNA sequence repeats to the telomere, re-lengthening it. In humans, telomerase is expressed in embryonic stem cells and some other cells, but most somatic cells do not express it.

While working at Geron Corporation, Andrews co-discovered the RNA component of human telomerase (hTR). For this discovery, Andrews was awarded second place as "National Inventor of the Year" in 1997 by the Intellectual Property Owners Association. Andrews also co-discovered the protein component of human telomerase (hTERT). The hTERT gene is present in all human cells, but is repressed in most.

In 1997, Andrews left Geron, and, in 1999, founded Sierra Sciences to pursue the anti-aging implications of these discoveries, intending to find a drug that would "switch on" this repressed gene.

== Company history ==
At the time of its inception, Sierra Sciences' president was Dan Fylstra, founder of VisiCorp.

In 2002, Richard Offerdahl, co-founder of Zycad Corporation and former director of Digi International, assumed the position of chairman of the board of Sierra Sciences.

In 2003, Offerdahl was elected chief operating officer and Pierluigi Zappacosta (co-founder of Logitech) was elected president and chief executive officer.

In 2008, Andrews was promoted to president and CEO, and Zappacosta took the roles of co-chairman of the board and vice president, business development.

In early 2016, Bill Andrews announced that Sierra Sciences was working with BioViva and will be to starting a new venture BioViva FIJI on Fiji and they will be the first company to use gene therapy to treat biological aging in humans. However, when contacted for comment, authorities in Fiji denied any such claim.

== Discoveries ==
In 2001, Sierra Sciences discovered a repressor binding site (dubbed "Site C") that blocks the expression of telomerase reverse transcriptase ("TERT"), patented in 2004. Sierra Sciences discovered another repressor bind site, "GC-Box 5," in 2004, patented in 2007.

Sierra Sciences discovered methods of assaying TERT promoter modulatory agents, allowing the company to efficiently check a variety of compounds to see if they inhibit repression of hTERT, in 2005.

In 2007, the company discovered a small-molecule drug-like compound, "C0057684", that activates telomerase expression in human cells. In 2008, using C0057684 as a positive control, Sierra Sciences developed a quantitative PCR based high-throughput screening assay to more efficiently screen for compounds that transiently induce the expression of endogenous telomerase in human cells. Sierra Sciences has identified more than fifty such drugs and is characterizing their mechanism of action.

== See also ==
- Telomere
- Telomerase
