= William H. Andrews (biologist) =

American molecular biologist and gerontologist

- Born: December 10, 1951 (age 74); Saginaw, Michigan, U.S.
- Education: University of California, San Diego (BSc); University of Georgia (PhD)
- Awards: IPO National Inventor of the Year (second place)
- Scientific career
- Fields: Molecular biology
- Workplaces: Sierra Sciences

William Henry Andrews (born December 10, 1951) is an American molecular biologist and biogerontologist whose career is centered on searching for a cure for human aging. Andrews is the founder and president of the biotechnology company Sierra Sciences. In the 1990s, he led the team at Geron Corporation that was the first to successfully identify the genes for human enzyme telomerase. This enzyme is responsible for preventing telomeres from shortening in human primordial germ cells (reproductive cells).

== Early life and education ==
Andrews was born on December 10, 1951, to television producer Ralph Andrews and Margaret Andrews. As a child, Andrews was told by his father that he should grow up to become a doctor and find a cure for aging. Andrews graduated from Cate School in 1971. He graduated from the University of California, San Diego in 1976 with two BSc degrees in Biology and Psychology, and earned his Ph.D. in Molecular and Population Genetics at the University of Georgia in 1981.

== Career ==
Andrews has been a medical researcher in biotech since 1981. He first worked at the biotechnology company Armos Corporation then Codon Corporation. Codon was purchased by Schering AG and became Berlex Biosciences. In 1993, Andrews convinced Berlex to send him to an anti-aging conference at Lake Tahoe, California, where he met Calvin Harley of Geron Corporation. Harley gave a speech on the subject of telomeres and telomerase, their discovery in the organism Tetrahymena by Elizabeth Blackburn and Carol Greider, and on the possible connection between telomeres and aging. Harley mentioned that no one had yet been successful in discovering the genes for telomerase in human beings. After the speech, Andrews approached Harley and told him that he could discover the genes for human telomerase for Geron in three months. Harley hired Andrews as Geron's Director of Molecular Biology. Three and a half months later, Andrews' team cloned the RNA component of telomerase ("hTR"). For this discovery, and the demonstration that the anti-sense of hTR could kill every cancer cell tested, Andrews and 3 members of his team were awarded second place for "National Inventor of the Year" in 1997 by the Intellectual Property Owners Association (first place having been awarded for the invention of the HIV Protease Inhibitor). Andrews' team later co-discovered the protein component of human telomerase ("hTERT") as well.

In 1998, Andrews founded Yonder Technologies, that later became Sierra Sciences in 1999 in Reno, Nevada, with the specific goal of curing human aging. Andrews assembled a team to search for a small molecule(s) that would bind to the telomerase repressor(s), causing the body to constitutively express telomerase in the presence of that molecule(s). From 1999 to 2005, Sierra Sciences' focus was to identify the telomerase repressor protein, in the hopes that a drug could be specifically designed to bind to it. During this time frame, Geron Corporation discovered TA-65, a small-molecule telomerase activator derived from Astragalus membranaceus. Sierra Sciences tested its efficacy, and shortly thereafter, Andrews became the first paying customer to take the supplement.

In 2005, Andrews switched to the "brute force" strategy of developing assays to screen large numbers of random chemicals to determine whether they induced expression of telomerase. In November 2007, after nearly two years of screening, Sierra Sciences discovered the chemical C0056784, which induces approximately 5% as much telomerase as is found in the immortal cancer cell line HeLa. In 2008, using C0057684 as a positive control, Sierra Sciences developed a more sensitive real-time PCR based high-throughput screening assay, the "hTERT RT-PCR assay," with which they were able to screen 4,000 chemicals per week. In 2010, Andrews and Sierra Sciences entered into an agreement with John Anderson, founder of Isagenix International, to use the new assay to screen natural ingredients for telomerase activity. A year later, based on the assay's results, Isagenix launched Product B, a telomerase inducing nutraceutical.

Andrews' team developed an hTERT Gene Therapy, using the Adeno-Associated Virus (AAV) as a vector, for research studies. This gene therapy was later licensed to Libella Gene Therapeutics in 2017 to be used in clinical studies.

Andrews is a named inventor on over 50 US-issued patents on telomerase and author of numerous scientific research studies published in peer-reviewed scientific journals.

== Personal life ==
Andrews is an ultramarathon runner. In 2008 and 2009, he successfully completed the Badwater Ultramarathon, a 135-mile race through Death Valley in temperatures approaching 130 °F (54 °C).

== Bibliography ==
- Bill Andrews on Telomere Basics: Curing Aging (Second Edition) (Sierra Sciences, 2014)
- Telomere Lengthening: Curing All Disease Including Aging and Cancer
