= Bryant Villeponteau =

American scientist and entrepreneur

- Born: December 19, 1944 (age 81); Camden, NJ
- Education: UCLA: BA, MS, Ph.D.
- Awards: 1997 Distinguished Inventor Award for Cloning Human Telomerase RNA; Hetero-chromatin Loss Theory of Aging
- Scientific career
- Fields: Aging, Alzheimer's Disease, Frailty, & Stem Cells
- Institutions: UCLA Biochemistry; University of Michigan; Genescient, Centagen

Bryant Villeponteau (born December 19, 1944) is an American scientist, entrepreneur, and longevity expert who has worked in both academia and industry.

His early work included the cloning of the RNA component of human telomerase when working at Geron Corporation, which led to his winning the 1997 Distinguished Inventor Award for cloning human telomerase along with three of his Geron teammates. In 2008, Villeponteau went on to serve as Vice President of Research of the aging genetics company Genescient, Inc., which uses machine learning technologies, biochemistry, and Drosophila genetics to develop therapeutics to help delay the aging process. He is also a cofounder of Centagen, Inc., which focuses on developing new technologies for extending human health and longevity by promoting adult stem cells.

== Education and Academic Achievements ==
Villeponteau was born in the United States on December 19, 1944, and obtained a B.A. in economics, a M.S. in Public Health Biostatistics, and a Ph.D. in biology from UCLA in Los Angeles. Villeponteau was awarded a Molecular Biology Postdoctoral Fellowship in the UCLA Department of Chemistry and Biochemistry from 1978 to 1980, where he carried out genomic cloning of the B-globin gene cluster in Chickens.... He continued in the same department for six more years as Assistant Research Chemist studying gene expression and chromatin structure. His torsional stress model of chromatin involvement in gene regulation was reviewed in a "Nature News and Views" article (Nature 316, pp. 394–395, August 1985).

From 1986 to 1992 Villeponteau was an assistant professor of biochemistry at the University of Michigan Medical School with a joint appointment in the Institute of Gerontology. At Michigan, Villeponteau mostly worked on human gene regulation Villeponteau also studied human cell aging using senescent human cells.

== Industry Achievements ==
In early 1992, Villeponteau was recruited as the first senior scientist at Geron Corporation with the goal of cloning the human telomerase genes. Telomerase is a two component enzyme (RNA and protein components) that maintains telomere length, which protects the ends of all chromosomes from damage or dysfunction. Since telomere length tends to shorten with age in humans leading to cellular senescence, telomerase was a potential key factor in promoting human aging from human cancer cells that led to the successful cloning of the first human telomerase gene in early 1994.

Following the RNA component of telomerase cloning, Villeponteau worked on Telomerase Therapeutics at Geron. He helped with the cloning effort that eventually identified the protein component of human telomerase in mid-1997. For the successful human RNA telomerase cloning effort, Villeponteau was the senior scientist in the team of four Geron scientists that won the 1997 Distinguished Inventor Award in Washington DC. His subsequent work at Geron provided more evidence that telomeres and telomerase are significant factors in human aging. Geron's academic collaborators Elizabeth Blackburn and Carol Greider later shared the 2009 Nobel prize in Physiology or Medicine with Jack Szostak for their early discovery of how chromosomes are protected by telomeres and the enzyme telomerase.

In 1997 Villeponteau proposed the Heterochromatin Loss Model Of Aging, which proposed that the epigenetics of heterochromatin structure plays an important role in aging. Heterchromatin is a repressor of gene expression and its loss leads to inappropriate gene expression with senescence. The model suggests that heterochromatin provides a fundamental epigenetic mechanism that underlies most of the changes in gene expression in senescence. Recent research in Drosophila has supported this heterochromatin loss model and suggest that heterochromatin loss with age may be a unifying theory of aging

From 2002 to 2008, Villeponteau worked for the Reno, NV biotech company Sierra Sciences in several science advisory positions. Sierra Sciences is a biotech company founded by Bill Andrews that develops drugs for telomerase activation and has filed many telomerase-related patents.

In 2008 Villeponteau joined Genescient as Vice President of Research. Genescient (an Irvine biotech spinoff of the University of California/UCI that was cofounded by Gregory Benford) uses advanced genomics and machine learning technologies to develop drugs and nutraceuticals for age-related disease. At Genescient, Villeponteau worked with UCI professors Michael R. Rose, Larry Mueller, and Anthony Long to understand the genetic difference in long-lived Methuselah flies, which live 3 to 4 times longer than wild-type flies.

== Work with Stem Cells and Formation of Centagen ==
Geron Corporation was the first company to develop human embryonic stem cell lines in the mid-1990s. As the Champion of Telomerase Therapeutics at Geron, Villeponteau was interested in the status of telomerase in embryonic stem cells. As it turns out, embryonic stem cells have very high levels of telomerase. However, other aspects of embryonic stem cells were not ideal for human therapeutics (e.g. the formation of teratoma cancers), so many scientists and practitioners focused instead on adult stem cells, which do not typically generate tumors. In 2008, Villeponteau formulated a botanical mix that provided telomere support and boosted adult stem cell populations. Extensive work at Genescient showed definitively that the formulation can double maximum Drosophila life span under specific stress conditions

In 2009 Villeponteau cofounded Centagen, which is a biotech company dedicated to developing stem cell technologies that can rejuvenate human adult stem cells from blood, bone marrow, or adipose tissue. Stem cell numbers and/or function decline with age. Many stem cell scientists hypothesize that stem cells hold the key to regenerating youthful function.
