= Isagenix =

Multi-level marketing company

Isagenix International
- Type: Private
- Industry: Dietary supplements; multi-level marketing
- Founded: 2002
- Headquarters: Gilbert, AZ, US
- Key people: Jim Coover, Founder; Kathy Coover, Founder; John Anderson, Founder; Sharron Walsh, CEO
- Website: isagenix.com

Isagenix International LLC is a privately held network marketing company that sells dietary supplements and nutritional super food products. The company, based in Gilbert, Arizona, was founded in 2002 by John Anderson, Jim Coover, and Kathy Coover.

== History ==
Isagenix was founded by John Anderson and Jim and Kathy Coover in 2002. The company expanded into Australia and New Zealand in 2007. In September 2011, biologist William H. Andrews of Sierra Sciences was appointed, and the following year launched an “anti-aging” product containing several natural compounds that Sierra Sciences had reportedly verified to have "telomere-supporting" properties.

In January 2020, Isagenix announced its acquisition of International, a multi-level marketing company based in Lehi, Utah. In 2021, The company partnered with TerraCycle to recycle product packaging that cannot be processed through municipal programs. The company has been challenged for making product claims that are not supported by science.

== Products and business model ==
Isagenix sells dietary supplement products, as well as cosmetics through a multi-level marketing model. The Isagenix diet involves consuming Isagenix products, meals, and shakes for 30 days, along with other supplements.

The company also sells "Financial Wellness" product bundles to their multi-level marketing distributors. Distributors are required to actively recruit new members to earn money. The company's promotional materials highlight people earning more than $100k per month; however, most distributors earn less than 500 dollars per year.

A report by Australian consumer organization CHOICE, describes instances of unqualified associates providing medical advice about the products, a practice which the company says it does not authorize.

== Controversy ==
Physician Harriet A. Hall published a lengthy critique of Isagenix products in Skeptical Inquirer, in which she said that many of the claims made about the products are false, and that the amount of vitamin A in some of the products is dangerous and goes against the recommendations of The Medical Letter.
