= Mary Armanios =

American oncologist and geneticist

Mary Armanios is Professor of Oncology, Genetic Medicine, Pathology and Molecular Biology, and Genetics at Johns Hopkins University School of Medicine and the Director of the Telomere Center at Johns Hopkins University. Her research focuses on the role of telomeres in disease.

== Career ==
Armanios graduated from the Ohio State University with a doctorate in medicine in 1996. She then did a combined residency in internal medicine and pediatrics at Ohio State University, followed by two fellowships at Johns Hopkins. When she began studying idiopathic pulmonary fibrosis (IPF), Armanios was a research fellow in the laboratory of Carol Greider, who later won the 2009 Nobel Prize in physiology or medicine for her work on telomerase. Armanios published her research relating TERT mutations to the etiology of IPF in the Proceedings of the National Academy of Sciences and the New England Journal of Medicine.

Armanios opened her laboratory at Johns Hopkins in 2007. She now studies the role of telomerase and telomeres in lung disease and cancer. Her lab has identified the genetic basis, natural history and clinical implications of the telomere syndromes. She founded and oversees the Telomere Clinic which provides multi-disciplinary care to patients with telomere syndromes. Armanios is the Founder and Director of the Telomere Lab which serves as a reference for telomere length testing in the United States. Her group also maintains a registry of individuals with disorders affected by genetic mutations relating to telomerase.

In 2019, Armanios was recruited as the inaugural Associate Director for Cancer Research Training and Education at the Sidney Kimmel Comprehensive Cancer Center.

In 2013, she was elected to the American Society for Clinical Investigation. She is also an elected member of the Interurban Clinical Club and the Association of American Physicians. She was elected as a fellow of the American Association for the Advancement of Science in 2019.

From 2017-2022, she served as a member of the editorial board of the Journal of Clinical Investigation.
