= Small nucleolar RNA SNORA2 =

Member of the H/ACA class of small nucleolar RNA

Small nucleolar RNA SNORA2/SNORA34 family
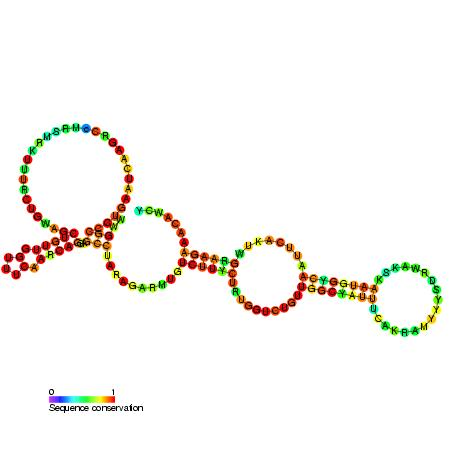
- Predicted secondary structure and sequence conservation of SNORA2

Identifiers
- Symbol: SNORA2
- Alt. Symbols: snoACA2
- Rfam: RF00410

Other data
- RNA type: Gene; snRNA; snoRNA; HACA-box
- Domain: Eukaryota
- GO: GO:0006396 GO:0005730
- SO: SO:0000594
- PDB structures: PDBe

In molecular biology, SNORA2 (also known as ACA2) is a non-coding RNA (ncRNA) which modifies other small nuclear RNAs (snRNAs). It is a member of the H/ACA class of small nucleolar RNA that guide the sites of modification of uridines to pseudouridines.

ACA2 was originally cloned from HeLa cells by association with GAR1 protein. It has the predicted hairpin-hinge-hairpin-tail structure and has the conserved H/ACA-box motifs. Originally two sequence variants of ACA2 were identified (called ACA2a and ACA2b). Both variants share approximately 66% sequence identity to another snoRNA characterised in the same study called ACA34 (also known as SNORA34). In the human genome all three snoRNAs (ACA2a, ACA2b and ACA34) are found to be located in the introns of the same gene. This gene encodes a predicted protein referred to as FLJ20436.

Both variants of ACA2 have the same two predicted target sites (U4263 and U4282) in 28S ribosomal RNA (rRNA). ACA34 is also predicted to target one of these sites (U4282) in addition to U4269 of 28S rRNA. The sequence similarity, genomic location and the predicted target sites of these three snoRNAs suggest they have been generated by subsequent gene duplications during evolution.
