= Ateganosine =

Clinical data
- Other names: 2'-Deoxythioguanosine

Identifiers
- IUPAC name: 2-amino-9-[(2R,4S,5R)-4-hydroxy-5-(hydroxymethyl)oxolan-2-yl]-3H-purine-6-thione
- CAS Number: 789-61-7
- PubChem CID: 3000603
- DrugBank: DB18117
- ChemSpider: 2272164
- UNII: KR0RFB46DF
- KEGG: D13071
- ChEMBL: ChEMBL3250476
- CompTox Dashboard (EPA): DTXSID4021345

Chemical and physical data
- Formula: C_{10}H_{13}N_{5}O_{3}S
- Molar mass: 283.31 g·mol^{−1}
- 3D model (JSmol): Interactive image
- SMILES: C1[C@@H]([C@H](O[C@H]1N2C=NC3=C2NC(=NC3=S)N)CO)O
- InChI: InChI=InChI=1S/C10H13N5O3S/c11-10-13-8-7(9(19)14-10)12-3-15(8)6-1-4(17)5(2-16)18-6/h3-6,16-17H,1-2H2,(H3,11,13,14,19)/t4-,5+,6+/m0/s1; Key:SCVJRXQHFJXZFZ-KVQBGUIXSA-N

Ateganosine is a telomerase inhibitor and apoptosis inducer currently under investigation for the treatment of various cancers, including non-small cell lung cancer (NSCLC).
