= National Academy of Inventors =

American organization

- Founded: 2010
- Website: academyofinventors.org

The National Academy of Inventors (NAI) is a US non-profit organization dedicated to encouraging inventors in academia, following the model of the National Academies of the United States. It was founded at the University of South Florida in 2010.

Starting in 2012, the NAI has inducted more than 2,000 Fellows into the organization as of November 2026. Fellows must be named as an inventor on at least one US patent and are selected by the NAI Fellows Committee.

The NAI also includes colleges and universities as institutional members, beginning with 9 such institutions in 2012; it now has over 200, including 30 outside the United States..

Since 2013, the National Academy of Inventors and the Intellectual Property Owners Association have released an annual report listing the top 100 universities by the number of US patents. The University of California has topped the list each year.

The NAI has held a yearly national conference since 2011.

In 2017, US representative Dennis A. Ross introduced the bill HR 976, which would provide the NAI a federal charter like those held by other US National Academies.
