= RTEL1 =

Human protein-coding gene

Identifiers
- Aliases: RTEL1, C20orf41, DKCA4, DKCB5, NHL, RTEL, PFBMFT3, regulator of telomere elongation helicase 1
- External IDs: OMIM: 608833; MGI: 2139369; GeneCards: RTEL1

Gene location (Human)
Chr.	Chromosome 20 (human)
Band	20q13.33	Start	63,657,810 bp
Band	20q13.33	End	63,696,253 bp

Gene location (Mouse)
Chr.	Chromosome 2 (mouse)
Band	2|2 H4	Start	180,961,532 bp
Band	2|2 H4	End	180,998,409 bp
RNA expression pattern
Bgee	Human / Mouse (ortholog); Top expressed in: sural nerve; right hemisphere of cerebellum; pituitary gland; gastric mucosa; anterior pituitary; body of uterus; Descending thoracic aorta; ascending aorta; right lobe of thyroid gland; muscle layer of sigmoid colon / Top expressed in: spermatocyte; genital tubercle; hand; tail of embryo; blastocyst; ventricular zone; morula; neural layer of retina; epiblast; spermatid; More reference expression data
BioGPS	n/a
Gene ontology
Molecular function	nucleotide binding; protein binding; ATP binding; helicase activity; hydrolase activity; hydrolase activity, acting on acid anhydrides, in phosphorus-containing anhydrides; DNA binding; iron-sulfur cluster binding; nucleic acid binding; metal ion binding; 4 iron, 4 sulfur cluster binding; DNA helicase activity; DNA polymerase binding
Cellular component	nucleoplasm; nucleus; telomere
Biological process	DNA duplex unwinding; positive regulation of telomeric loop disassembly; DNA recombination; nucleobase-containing compound metabolic process; positive regulation of telomere capping; negative regulation of telomere maintenance in response to DNA damage; DNA replication; positive regulation of telomere maintenance; mitotic telomere maintenance via semi-conservative replication; cellular response to DNA damage stimulus; telomere maintenance in response to DNA damage; replication fork processing; positive regulation of telomere maintenance via telomere lengthening; telomere maintenance; DNA repair; regulation of double-strand break repair via homologous recombination; strand displacement; negative regulation of DNA recombination; telomeric loop disassembly; negative regulation of t-circle formation
Sources:Amigo / QuickGO
Orthologs
Databases	NCBI: entry; OMA: entry
Species	Human	Mouse
Entrez	51750	269400
Ensembl	ENSG00000258366	ENSMUSG00000038685
UniProt	Q9NZ71	Q0VGM9
RefSeq (mRNA)	NM_032957; NM_001283009; NM_001283010; NM_016434; NM_015647	NM_001001882; NM_001166665; NM_001166666; NM_001166667; NM_001166668 NM_001363071
RefSeq (protein)	NP_001269938; NP_001269939; NP_057518; NP_116575	NP_001001882; NP_001160137; NP_001160138; NP_001160139; NP_001160140 NP_001350000
Location (UCSC)	Chr 20: 63.66 – 63.7 Mb	Chr 2: 180.96 – 181 Mb
PubMed search
- Wikidata
View/Edit Human	View/Edit Mouse

Regulator of telomere elongation helicase 1 is a protein that in humans is encoded by the RTEL1 gene.

== Gene ==
Read-through transcription of the RTEL1 gene into the neighboring downstream TNFRSF6B gene, which encodes tumor necrosis factor receptor superfamily, member 6b, generates a non-coding transcript. Alternative splicing results in multiple transcript variants encoding different isoforms.

== Function ==
This gene encodes a DNA helicase which functions in the stability, protection and elongation of telomeres and interacts with proteins in the shelterin complex known to protect telomeres during DNA replication.

== Clinical significance ==
Mutations in this gene have been associated with dyskeratosis congenita and Hoyeraal–Hreidarsson syndrome.
