= NHP2 =

Protein-coding gene in the species Homo sapiens

Identifiers
- Aliases: NHP2, DKCB2, NHP2P, NOLA2, NHP2 ribonucleoprotein
- External IDs: OMIM: 606470; MGI: 1098547; GeneCards: NHP2

Gene location (Human)
Chr.	Chromosome 5 (human)
Band	5q35.3	Start	178,149,463 bp
Band	5q35.3	End	178,153,894 bp

Gene location (Mouse)
Chr.	Chromosome 11 (mouse)
Band	11 B1.3|11 31.14 cM	Start	51,510,562 bp
Band	11 B1.3|11 31.14 cM	End	51,514,541 bp
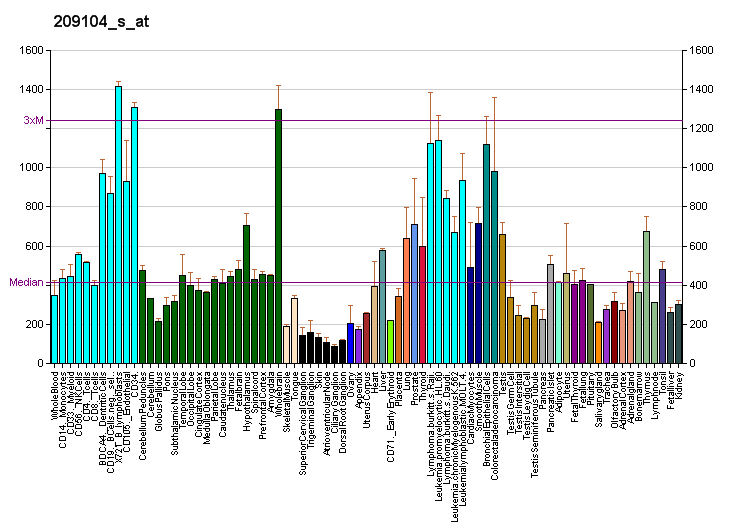

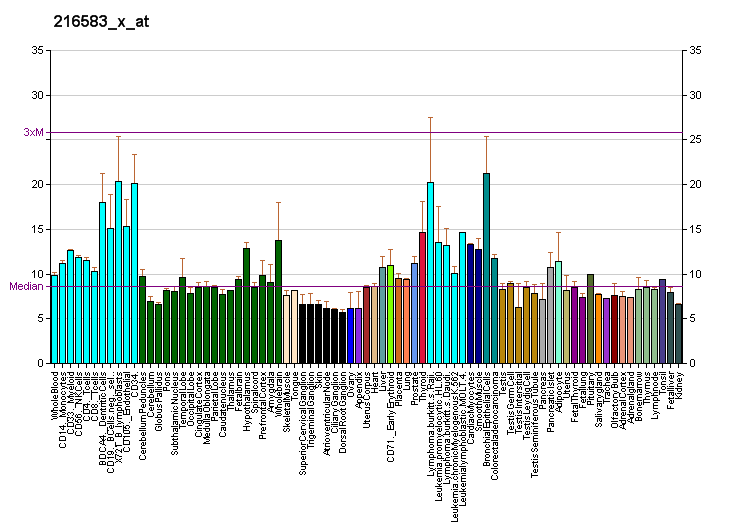
RNA expression pattern
Bgee	Human / Mouse (ortholog); Top expressed in: gums; gingival epithelium; oral cavity; prefrontal cortex; nucleus accumbens; caudate nucleus; putamen; skin of leg; ganglionic eminence; skin of abdomen / Top expressed in: primitive streak; hair follicle; morula; morula; endothelial cell of lymphatic vessel; yolk sac; embryo; epiblast; embryo; somite; More reference expression data
BioGPS	More reference expression data
Gene ontology
Molecular function	box H/ACA snoRNA binding; protein binding; telomerase RNA binding; snoRNA binding; RNA binding
Cellular component	sno(s)RNA-containing ribonucleoprotein complex; Cajal body; box H/ACA telomerase RNP complex; box H/ACA scaRNP complex; nucleolus; telomerase holoenzyme complex; box H/ACA snoRNP complex; nucleus; cytosolic large ribosomal subunit; nucleoplasm
Biological process	telomere maintenance via telomerase; ribosome biogenesis; positive regulation of telomerase RNA localization to Cajal body; rRNA processing; cleavage involved in rRNA processing; snRNA pseudouridine synthesis; maturation of LSU-rRNA; protein biosynthesis; rRNA pseudouridine synthesis
Sources:Amigo / QuickGO
Orthologs
Databases	NCBI: entry; OMA: entry
Species	Human	Mouse
Entrez	55651	52530
Ensembl	ENSG00000145912	ENSMUSG00000001056
UniProt	Q9NX24	Q9CRB2
RefSeq (mRNA)	NM_017838; NM_001034833; NM_001396110	NM_026631; NM_001364736
RefSeq (protein)	NP_001030005; NP_060308	NP_080907; NP_001351665
Location (UCSC)	Chr 5: 178.15 – 178.15 Mb	Chr 11: 51.51 – 51.51 Mb
PubMed search
- Wikidata
View/Edit Human	View/Edit Mouse

H/ACA ribonucleoprotein complex subunit 2 is a protein that in humans is encoded by the NHP2 gene.

== Identifiers ==
This gene is a member of the H/ACA snoRNPs (small nucleolar ribonucleoproteins) gene family. snoRNPs are involved in various aspects of rRNA processing and modification and have been classified into two families: C/D and H/ACA.

The H/ACA snoRNPs also include the DKC1, NOLA1 and NOLA3 proteins. These four H/ACA snoRNP proteins localize to the dense fibrillar components of nucleoli and coiled (Cajal) bodies in the nucleus. Both 18S rRNA production and rRNA pseudouridylation are impaired if any of the four proteins is depleted. The four H/ACA snoRNP proteins are also components of the telomerase complex. This gene encodes a protein related to Saccharomyces cerevisiae Nhp2p. Two transcript variants encoding different isoforms have been found for this gene.
