= DCLRE1B =

Protein-coding gene in humans

Identifiers
- Aliases: DCLRE1B, APOLLO, SNM1B, SNMIB, DNA cross-link repair 1B
- External IDs: OMIM: 609683; MGI: 2156057; GeneCards: DCLRE1B
Available structures
PDB	Ortholog search: PDBe RCSB
PDB	List of PDB id codes 3BUA, 5AHO
Enzyme activity
EC #	BRENDA	ExPASy	KEGG	MetaCyc
3.5.2.6	↗	↗	↗	↗

Gene location (Human)
Chr.	Chromosome 1 (human)
Band	1p13.2	Start	113,905,213 bp
Band	1p13.2	End	113,914,086 bp

Gene location (Mouse)
Chr.	Chromosome 3 (mouse)
Band	3|3 F2.2	Start	103,707,921 bp
Band	3|3 F2.2	End	103,716,760 bp
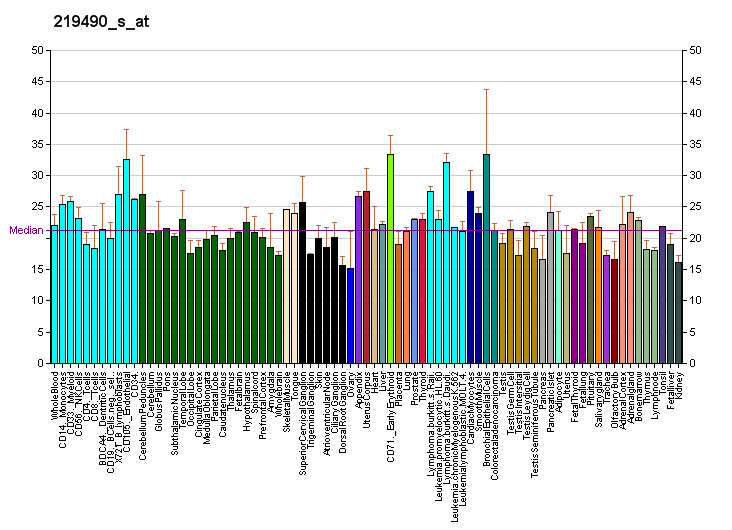
RNA expression pattern
Bgee	Human / Mouse (ortholog); Top expressed in: secondary oocyte; gonad; ganglionic eminence; ventricular zone; monocyte; skin of hip; testicle; granulocyte; bone marrow; trabecular bone / Top expressed in: granulocyte; blood; otic vesicle; cumulus cell; yolk sac; endocardial cushion; external carotid artery; abdominal wall; ventricular zone; tail of embryo; More reference expression data
BioGPS	More reference expression data
Gene ontology
Molecular function	5'-3' exonuclease activity; 5'-3' exodeoxyribonuclease activity; damaged DNA binding; protein binding; nuclease activity; exonuclease activity; hydrolase activity; protein homodimerization activity; protein-containing complex binding
Cellular component	cytoplasm; centrosome; chromosome; microtubule organizing center; telomere; cytoskeleton; nucleus; nucleoplasm; nuclear body
Biological process	cell cycle checkpoint signaling; protection from non-homologous end joining at telomere; telomeric 3' overhang formation; cellular response to DNA damage stimulus; double-strand break repair via nonhomologous end joining; telomere maintenance; telomeric loop formation; DNA repair; nucleic acid phosphodiester bond hydrolysis; telomere maintenance via telomere lengthening; telomere capping; interstrand cross-link repair; mitotic cell cycle checkpoint signaling
Sources:Amigo / QuickGO
Orthologs
Databases	NCBI: entry; OMA: entry
Species	Human	Mouse
Entrez	64858	140917
Ensembl	ENSG00000118655	ENSMUSG00000027845
UniProt	Q9H816	Q8C7W7
RefSeq (mRNA)	NM_022836; NM_001319946; NM_001319947; NM_001363690; NM_001363691	NM_001025312; NM_133865
RefSeq (protein)	NP_001306875; NP_001306876; NP_073747; NP_001350619; NP_001350620	NP_001020483; NP_598626
Location (UCSC)	Chr 1: 113.91 – 113.91 Mb	Chr 3: 103.71 – 103.72 Mb
PubMed search
- Wikidata
View/Edit Human	View/Edit Mouse

DNA cross-link repair 1B protein is a protein that in humans is encoded by the DCLRE1B gene.

DNA interstrand cross-links prevent strand separation, thereby physically blocking transcription, replication, and segregation of DNA. DCLRE1B is one of several evolutionarily conserved genes involved in repair of interstrand cross-links (Dronkert et al., 2000).[supplied by OMIM]

== Function ==
The DCLRE1B/SNM1B/Apollo protein is a repair exonuclease that digests double-stranded and single-stranded DNA with a 5’ to 3’ directionality.

Using an SNM1B/Apollo knockout mouse model, evidence was obtained that SNM1B/Apollo protein is required to protect telomeres against illegitimate non-homologous end joining that can result in genomic instability and consequently in multi-organ developmental failure.

In a human patient with Hoyeraal–Hreidarsson syndrome, a dominant negative mutation in the SNM1B/Apollo gene was discovered. This mutation hampered the proper replication of telomeres, leading to major telomeric dysfunction and cellular senescence. SNM1B/Apollo protein appears to be a crucial factor in telomere maintenance, independent of its function in repairing DNA inter-strand crosslinks.
