= Hoyeraal–Hreidarsson syndrome =

- Other names: Progressive pancytopenia-immunodeficiency-cerebellar hypoplasia syndrome
- This condition is inherited in an X-linked recessive manner.
- Specialty: Medical genetics
- Causes: Mutation in genes related to telomere maintenance

Hoyeraal–Hreidasson syndrome is a very rare multisystem X-linked recessive disorder characterized by excessively short telomeres and is considered a severe form of dyskeratosis congenita. Being an X-linked disorder, Hoyeraal–Hreidasson syndrome primarily affects males. Patients typically present in early childhood with cerebellar hypoplasia, immunodeficiency, progressive bone marrow failure, and intrauterine growth restriction. The primary cause of death in Hoyeraal–Hreidasson syndrome is bone marrow failure, but mortality from cancer and pulmonary fibrosis is also significant.

== Presentation ==
The currently recognized features are cerebellar hypoplasia, immunodeficiency, progressive bone marrow failure, and intrauterine growth restriction. Patients also commonly exhibit symptoms such as microcephaly, aplastic anemia, and intellectual disability.

=== Overlap with dyskeratosis congenita ===
Patients with Hoyeraal–Hreidasson syndrome frequently present with the mucocutaneous triad of nail dysplasia, lacy skin pigmentation, and oral leukoplakia.

== Pathogenesis ==
Although the pathogenesis remains unknown, it is strongly suspected that the clinical sequelae of Hoyeraal–Hreidasson syndrome arise from the accelerated telomere shortening. It has been associated with mutations in DKC1, TERT, RTEL1, TINF2, ACD, and PARN.

== Diagnosis ==
- Neuroimaging – cerebellar hypoplasia/atrophy, small brainstem, thin corpus callosum and cerebral calcifications
- Molecular genetic testing – for confirmation

== Treatment ==
Current treatment is supportive:

- The aplastic anemia and immunodeficiency can be treated by bone marrow transplantation.
- Supportive treatment for gastrointestinal complications and infections.
- Genetic counselling.

== See also ==
- Dyskeratosis congenita
