= Small nucleolar RNA SNORA17 =

Member of the H/ACA class of small nucleolar RNA

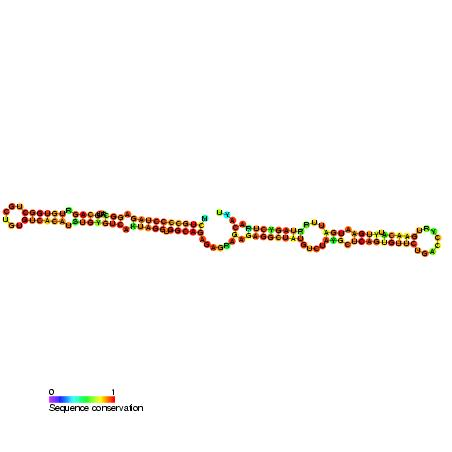
- Predicted secondary structure and sequence conservation of SNORA17

Identifiers
- Symbol: SNORA17
- Alt. Symbols: snoACA17
- Rfam: RF00560

Other data
- RNA type: Gene; snRNA; snoRNA; HACA-box
- Domain: Eukaryota
- GO: GO:0006396 GO:0005730
- SO: SO:0000594
- PDB structures: PDBe

In molecular biology, SNORA17 (also known as ACA17) is a member of the H/ACA class of small nucleolar RNA that guide the sites of modification of uridines to pseudouridines. Specifically, it is predicted to guide pseudouridylation of the 28S rRNA at positions U4659 and U4598. It shares the same host gene together with ACA43.

There are many closely related sequences that do not appear to have conserved H and ACA boxes, and may be pseudogenes.
