= Telomerase RNA component =

NcRNA found in eukaryotes

TERC
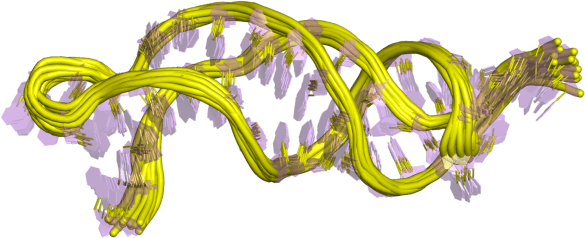
- TERC cristallised (PDB 1YMO)

Identifiers
- Aliases: TERC, DKCA1, PFBMFT2, SCARNA19, TR, TRC3, hTR, Telomerase RNA component, TER
- External IDs: OMIM: 602322; GeneCards: TERC

Gene location (Human)
| Chr. | Chromosome 3 (human) |
| Band | 3q26.2 | Start | 169,764,610 bp |
| Band | 3q26.2 | End | 169,765,047 bp |
RNA expression pattern
| Bgee | Human / Mouse (ortholog); Top expressed in: bone marrow cell; epithelium of colon; testicle; skeletal muscle tissue; sural nerve; Achilles tendon; tonsil; lung; kidney; blood / n/a; More reference expression data |
| BioGPS | n/a |
Orthologs
| Databases | NCBI: entry; OMA: entry |
| Species | Human | Mouse |
| Entrez | 7012 | n/a |
| Ensembl | ENSG00000277925 | n/a |
| UniProt | n a | n/a |
| RefSeq (mRNA) | n/a | n/a |
| RefSeq (protein) | n/a | n/a |
| Location (UCSC) | Chr 3: 169.76 – 169.77 Mb | n/a |
| PubMed search | | n/a |
- Wikidata
| View/Edit Human |

Vertebrate telomerase RNA

Identifiers
- Symbol: Telomerase-vert
- Rfam: RF00024

Other data
- RNA type: Gene
- Domain(s): Eukaryote; Virus
- PDB structures: PDBe

Ciliate telomerase RNA

Identifiers
- Symbol: Telomerase-cil
- Rfam: RF00025

Other data
- RNA type: Gene
- Domain: Eukaryote
- PDB structures: PDBe

Saccharomyces cerevisiae telomerase RNA

Identifiers
- Symbol: Sacc_telomerase
- Rfam: RF01050

Other data
- RNA type: Gene
- Domain: Eukaryote
- PDB structures: PDBe

Telomerase RNA component (TERC), also abbreviated TER or TR, is a non-coding RNA found in eukaryotes that is a component of the telomerase enzyme, which extends telomeres at the ends of linear chromosomes. TERC folds into a complex secondary structure which binds to and interacts with TERT, the protein component of telomerase, and serves as the RNA template for the reverse transcription reaction catalyzed by TERT. Telomerase RNAs differ greatly in length, sequence and structure between vertebrates, ciliates and yeasts, but they share a 5' pseudoknot structure close to the template sequence; vertebrate telomerase RNAs also share a 3' H/ACA snoRNA-like domain.

== Structure ==
TERC is a species of long non-coding RNA (lncRNA) which varies in length from approximately 150 nucleotides in ciliates to 400–600 nucleotides in vertebrates and 1,300 nucleotides in yeast. Mature human TERC (hTR) is 451 nucleotides in length. TERC has extensive secondary structural features which are generally used to define four principal conserved domains. The core domain, the largest domain at the 5' end of TERC, contains the critical CUAAC template sequence, which is used as a template by the TERT protein for the synthesis by reverse transcription of the DNA oligonucleotides that comprise the repeats added to the ends of telomeres. The secondary structure of this domain consists of a large loop containing the template sequence, a P1 loop-closing helix, and a P2/P3 pseudoknot. The core domain and CR4/CR5 conserved domain associate with TERT and are the only domains of TERC necessary for the catalytic activity of telomerase in vitro. The 3' end of TERC consists of a conserved H/ACA domain, a 2-hairpin structure connected by a single-stranded hinge and bordered on the 3' end by a single-stranded ACA sequence. The H/ACA domain binds the dyskerin, GAR1, NOP10, and NHP2 proteins to form an H/ACA ribonucleoprotein complex. The conserved CR7 domain is also localized at the 3' end of TERC, and contains a 3-nucleotide CAB (Cajal body localisation) box which binds the TCAB1 protein.

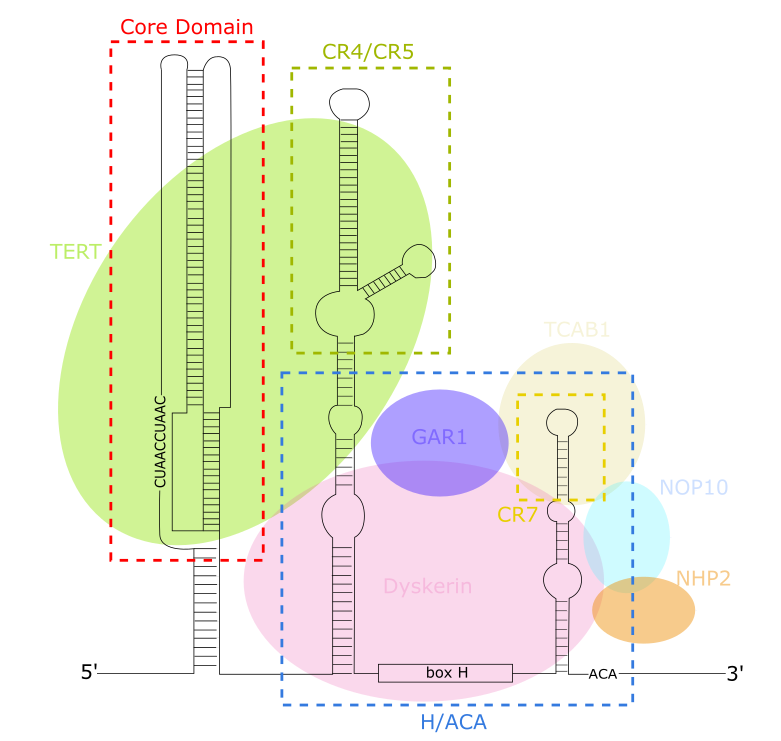
Illustration: hTR and associated proteins of the telomerase holoenzyme complex

== Function ==
Telomerase is a ribonucleoprotein with polymerase activity that maintains telomere ends by the addition of short tandem DNA repeats such as TTAGGG (the precise repeat motif varies across eukaryotes; see the table in the telomere article for a complete list). The enzyme is a complex of both protein and RNA components which work together to perform this function. The protein component, known as TERT, bears the primary reverse transcriptase activity, and the RNA component, known as TERC, serves as the template for the reverse transcription reaction. In vertebrates, for example, the sequence CCCUAA, found near position 50 of the mature TERC molecule, serves as the template sequence. Telomerase expression plays a role in cellular senescence, as it is normally repressed in postnatal somatic cells, resulting in progressive shortening of telomeres. Deregulation of telomerase expression in somatic cells is broadly implicated in oncogenesis because expression of telomerase can allow cancer cells to continuously lengthen their telomeres and thereby avoid senescence and programmed cell death. Studies in mice suggest that telomerase also participates in chromosomal repair, since de novo synthesis of telomere repeats may occur at double-stranded breaks. Homologs of TERC can also be found in the Gallid herpes viruses.

The core domain of TERC contains the RNA template from which TERT synthesizes TTAGGG telomeric repeats. Unlike in other RNPs, in telomerase, the protein TERT is catalytic while the lncRNA TERC is structural, rather than acting as a ribozyme. The core regions of TERC and TERT are sufficient to reconstitute catalytic telomerase activity in vitro, but the other regions are necessary in vivo. The H/ACA domain of TERC recruits the dyskerin complex (composed of DKC1, GAR1, NOP10, and NHP2), which stabilises TERC, increasing telomerase complex formation and overall catalytic activity. The CR7 domain binds TCAB1, which localizes telomerase to Cajal bodies, further increasing telomerase catalytic activity. TERC appears to be expressed ubiquitously, even in cells lacking telomerase activity and TERT expression. As a result, various TERT-independent functional roles of TERC have been proposed. Fourteen different genes containing a TERC binding motif are directly transcriptionally regulated by TERC through the formation of RNA-DNA triplex hybrids. TERC-mediated upregulation of Lin37, Trpg1l, tyrobp, and Usp16 stimulates the NF-κB pathway, resulting in increased expression and secretion of inflammatory cytokines.

== Biosynthesis ==
Unlike most lncRNAs which are assembled from introns by the spliceosome, hTR is directly transcribed from a dedicated promoter site located at genomic locus 3q26.2 by RNA polymerase II. Mature hTR is 451nt in length, but approximately 1/3 of cellular hTR transcripts at steady state have ~10nt genomically encoded 3' tails. The majority of those extended hTR species have additional oligo-A 3' extension. Processing of immature 3'-tailed hTR to mature 451nt hTR can be accomplished by direct 3'-5' exoribonucleolytic degradation or by an indirect pathway of oligoadenylation by PAPD5, removal of 3' oligo-A tail by the 3'-5' RNA exonuclease PARN, and subsequent 3'-5' exoribonucleolytic degradation. Extended hTR transcripts are also degraded by the RNA exosome.

The 5' ends of hTR transcripts are also additionally processed. TGS-1 hypermethylation the 5'-methylguanosine cap to an N2,2,7 trimethylguanosine (TMG) cap, which inhibits hTR maturation. Binding of the Dyskerin complex to transcribed H/ACA domains of hTR during transcription promotes termination of transcription. Control of the relative rates of these various competing pathways that activate or inhibit hTR maturation is a crucial element of regulation of overall telomerase activity.

== Clinical Significance ==
Loss of function mutations in the TERC genomic locus have been associated with a variety of degenerative diseases. Mutations in TERC have been associated with dyskeratosis congenita, idiopathic pulmonary fibrosis, aplastic anemia, and myelodysplasia. Overexpression and improper regulation of TERC have been associated with a variety of cancers. Upregulation of hTR is widely observed in patients with precancerous cervical phenotype as a result of HPV infection. Overexpression of TERC enhances MDV-mediated oncogenesis, and is observed in gastric carcinoma. Overexpression of TERC is also observed in inflammatory conditions such as Type II diabetes and multiple sclerosis, due to TERC-mediated activation of the NF-κB inflammatory pathway.

TERC has been implicated as protective in osteoporosis, with its increased expression arresting the rate of osteogenesis. Due to its overexpression in a range of cancer phenotypes, TERC has been investigated as a potential cancer biomarker. It was found to be an effective biomarker of lung squamous cell carcinoma (LUSC).
