= BioViva =

American biotechnology company

- Founded: 2015; 11 years ago
- Headquarters: Bainbridge Island, Washington, United States

BioViva is an American biotechnology gene therapy company, based in Bainbridge Island, Washington, researching treatments to stop or reverse the aging process in humans.

== History ==
BioViva was founded in 2015. The CEO, Elizabeth Parrish, started the company by becoming the first person in human history to take gene therapies associated with lengthening lifespans in model organism, she appeared at WIRED Health 2017 in London to discuss BioViva's testing of gene therapies targeting hallmarks of the ageing process. She stated, "The company was built essentially to prove these therapies work or not." Since then the company has gone into research and development and patented AAV based gene therapies and launched a new gene therapy platform with CMV as the vector. Parrish stated there was no other way to protect people's rights to new medicine in a talk in India at the Synapse Conference.

== Responses to Parrish using herself as first experimental subject ==
Parrish's decision to be 'patient zero' and test the company's technology on herself in a personalized N=1 study was a response to her son's diagnosis of Type 1 Diabetes. After finding no curative course Parrish looked into genetics. She claims that every gene BioViva targets will also treat a childhood disease. Dr. Lawrence Altman, author of Who Goes First? The Story of Self-Experimentation in Medicine has said, "N's of 1 have had their value through history, and will. But you're not going to license a drug based on an N-of-1." Her treatment, labelled as self-experimentation, was highly controversial. Though controversial, Dr Barry Marshall went on to win a Nobel prize for such an effort in the treatment of stomach ulcers. As the requirements to progress to human trials had not started, the US Food and Drug Administration did not authorize Parrish's experiments. Parrish traveled to Colombia for the treatments.

In 2016 some initially criticized BioViva's release of data claiming an extension of Parrish's leukocyte telomeres following her therapy, stating that the aforementioned extension is within the error change for telomere measurements. Dr. Bradley Johnson, Associate Professor of Pathology and Lab Medicine at the University of Pennsylvania said, "Telomere length measurements typically have low precision, with variation in measurements of around 10 percent, which is in the range of the reported telomere lengthening apparently experienced by Elizabeth Parrish." In 2022 BioViva released a peer reviewed paper that showed lengthening of telomeres over years.

The Hallmarks of Aging papers have created a platform in which to launch BioViva's gene therapies as their targets are these hallmarks. Telomeres were once thought oncogenic or cancer causing, but both María Blasco and BioViva added to evidence that it does not increase cancer risk in model organisms. The telomeres' function is to maintain chromosomal integrity and provide a substrate for DNA replication (thereby allowing for cellular multiplication), however, telomere shortening causes shortening of cellular lifetime which helps to avoid cancerous mutations in cells. Duncan Baird, a professor of Cancer and Genetics at Cardiff University's School of Medicine, states, "Meddling with a fundamentally important tumor-suppressive mechanism that has evolved in long-lived species like ours doesn't strike me as a particularly good idea."

George M. Martin, Professor of Pathology at the University of Washington, had agreed to be an adviser to the company, but resigned upon hearing about Parrish's self-experiments. But other advisors for BioViva have stayed, including Prof George Church of Harvard who has continued to advocate for the company and has shown BioViva's most recent data in several virtual talks as of 2024.

In 2015, Antonio Regalado, a reporter for the MIT Technology Review states, "The experiment seems likely to be remembered as either a new low in medical quackery or, perhaps, the unlikely start of an era in which naive people receive genetic modifications not just to treat disease, but to reverse aging." Regalado seems to have changed his mind and reversed his criticism; he has since written several articles in support of the science. Since then several of the biggest companies and a few billionaires have started on the same pursuit including Jeff Bezos multi billion dollar endeavor called Altos and Google's anti-aging company called Calico.

== Research ==
BioViva's research interests are based on preclinical research of both the enzyme telomerase and inhibition of myostatin, Klotho, FGF21, and PGC-1a, all of which Parrish claims to have taken. BioViva since has expanded its interest to platform technology to deliver any of the multitude of gene that extend lifespans in model organism.

BioViva's research using its proprietary CMV gene therapy vector they were able to increase in life extension of 42% for a telomerase inducing gene therapy and 32% for a follistatin inducing gene therapy. The gene therapy was also re-dosable. Telomerase gene therapy utilizing an adeno-associated virus at the Spanish National Cancer Research Centre (CNIO), has demonstrated several beneficial effects and an increase in median lifespan of up to 24% in mice. Discussing her team's research, María Blasco stated in discussion with The Scientist, "We demonstrated that AAV9-Tert gene therapy was sufficient to delay age-related pathologies and extend both median and maximum longevity in mice. Many pathologies were delayed, including cancer. Translating these results to human diseases (telomere syndromes or certain age-related diseases without effective treatments) may be of interest in the context of clinical trials approved by the corresponding regulatory agencies. However, some experts draw attention that the results of studies in mice cannot always be directly transferred to humans.

In 2021, BioViva again came under media interest in their involvement of assessing data of a human investigator lead study for dementia. This nonprofit funded trial was the first in human use for gene therapy for dementia with suspected Alzheimer's Disease. Defending the decision, Parrish claimed that it is essential for data to be collected on offshore trials for the betterment of patients, BioViva was given the patent for assessing this data. Parrish says the patent is pending.
