= Dyskerin =

Protein

DKC1

Identifiers
- Aliases: DKC1, CBF5, DKC, DKCX, NAP57, NOLA4, XAP101, Dyskerin, dyskerin pseudouridine synthase 1
- External IDs: OMIM: 300126; MGI: 1861727; HomoloGene: 1045; GeneCards: DKC1; OMA:DKC1 - orthologs

Gene location (Human)
| Chr. | X chromosome (human) |
| Band | Xq28 | Start | 154,762,742 bp |
| Band | Xq28 | End | 154,777,689 bp |

Gene location (Mouse)
| Chr. | X chromosome (mouse) |
| Band | X|X A7.3 | Start | 74,139,460 bp |
| Band | X|X A7.3 | End | 74,153,383 bp |
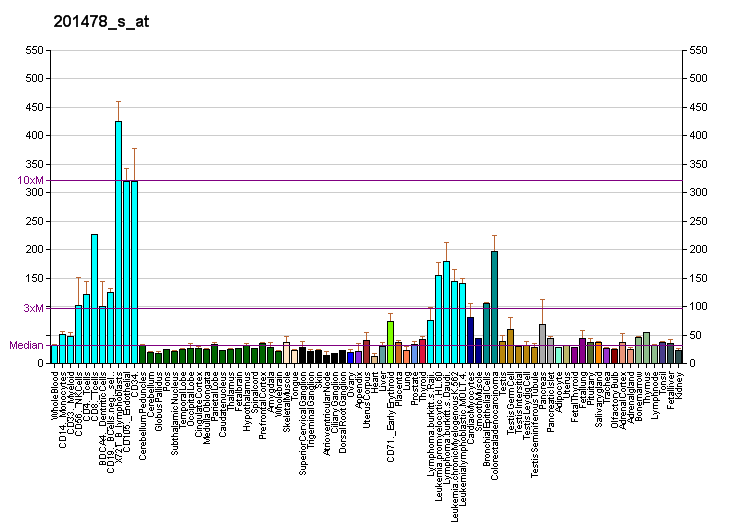

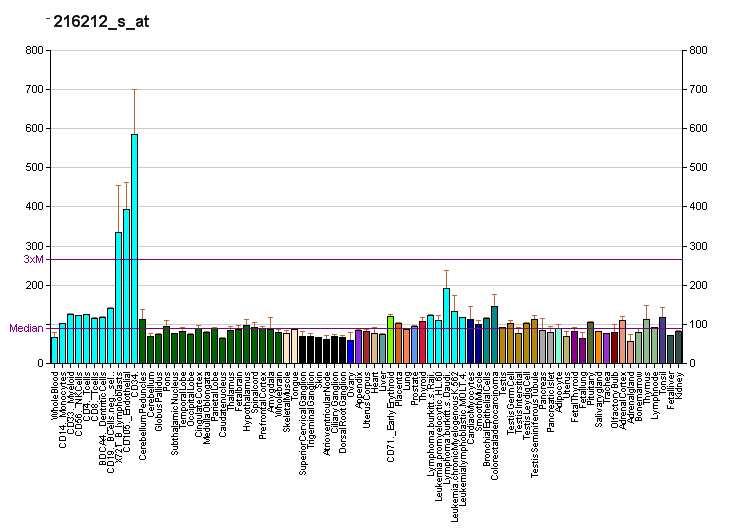

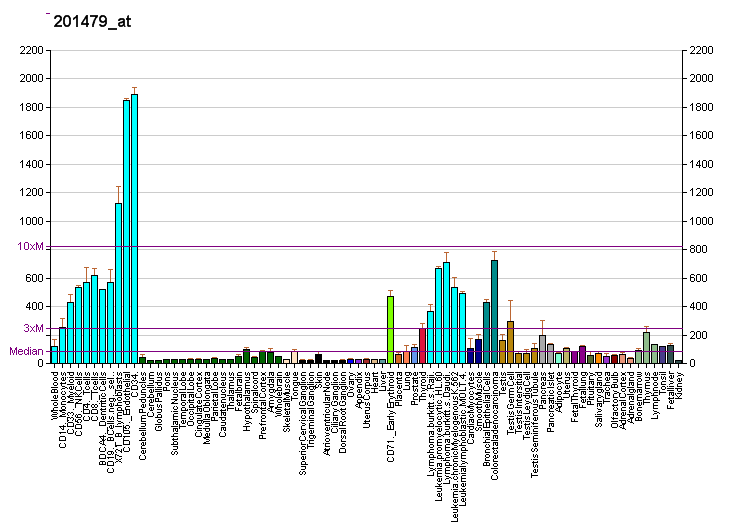
RNA expression pattern
| Bgee | Human / Mouse (ortholog); Top expressed in: secondary oocyte; sural nerve; gingival epithelium; hair follicle; tibia; tendon of biceps brachii; pancreatic ductal cell; Achilles tendon; epithelium of nasopharynx; cartilage tissue / Top expressed in: hand; tail of embryo; primitive streak; otic vesicle; epiblast; zygote; genital tubercle; secondary oocyte; embryo; abdominal wall; More reference expression data |
| BioGPS | More reference expression data |
Gene ontology
| Molecular function | telomerase activity; pseudouridine synthase activity; isomerase activity; box H/ACA snoRNA binding; protein binding; telomerase RNA binding; RNA binding |
| Cellular component | cytoplasm; Cajal body; box H/ACA telomerase RNP complex; box H/ACA scaRNP complex; telomerase holoenzyme complex; box H/ACA snoRNP complex; nucleus; fibrillar center; nucleoplasm; nucleolus |
| Biological process | pseudouridine synthesis; RNA processing; ribosome biogenesis; positive regulation of establishment of protein localization to telomere; telomerase RNA stabilization; box H/ACA RNA metabolic process; positive regulation of telomere maintenance via telomerase; snRNA pseudouridine synthesis; positive regulation of telomerase activity; positive regulation of telomerase RNA localization to Cajal body; rRNA processing; RNA modification; cell population proliferation; mRNA pseudouridine synthesis; box H/ACA RNA 3'-end processing; rRNA pseudouridine synthesis; telomere maintenance via telomerase; regulation of telomerase RNA localization to Cajal body |
Sources:Amigo / QuickGO
Orthologs
| Species | Human | Mouse |
| Entrez | 1736 | 245474 |
| Ensembl | ENSG00000130826 | ENSMUSG00000031403 |
| UniProt | O60832 | Q9ESX5 |
| RefSeq (mRNA) | NM_001142463; NM_001288747; NM_001363 | NM_001030307; NM_001359411; NM_001359412; NM_001359413 |
| RefSeq (protein) | NP_001135935; NP_001275676; NP_001354 | NP_001025478; NP_001346340; NP_001346341; NP_001346342 |
| Location (UCSC) | Chr X: 154.76 – 154.78 Mb | Chr X: 74.14 – 74.15 Mb |
| PubMed search |
- Wikidata
| View/Edit Human | View/Edit Mouse |

H/ACA ribonucleoprotein complex subunit 4 is a protein that in humans is encoded by the DKC1 gene. The encoded protein, known as dyskerin, is a highly conserved nucleolar enzyme that plays key roles in rRNA modification, telomerase function, and ribosome biogenesis.

== Structure ==
Dyskerin is an L-shaped protein consisting of approximately 514 amino acid residues, with a molecular weight of about 58 kilo-daltons. It belongs to the TruB family of pseudouridine synthase enzymes and forms the catalytic core of the H/ACA box snoRNP (small nucleolar ribonucleoprotein) complex. The DKC1 gene is located on the X chromosome, in a tail-to-tail orientation with the gene encoding palmitoylated erythrocyte membrane protein 1 (MPP1), and is transcribed in a telomere-to-centromere direction.

== Function ==
The DKC1 gene encodes a core component of the H/ACA snoRNP complex, which also includes the NOLA1, NOLA2, and NOLA3 proteins. These proteins localize to the dense fibrillar components of nucleoli and to coiled (Cajal) bodies in the nucleus. The H/ACA snoRNPs catalyze pseudouridylation of rRNA and are essential for proper ribosome biogenesis. Depletion of any of the four core proteins impairs 18S rRNA production and pseudouridylation.

Beyond rRNA modification, dyskerin contributes to several other fundamental processes. It stabilizes the telomerase RNA component (TERC), thereby maintaining telomerase activity and ensuring telomere elongation and genomic stability. Dyskerin also participates in the assembly and maturation of ribosomal subunits by promoting correct folding and processing of pre-rRNA intermediates. In addition, it has been implicated in the regulation of pre-mRNA splicing, potentially through interactions with small Cajal body-specific RNAs (scaRNAs) that guide pseudouridylation of spliceosomal RNAs.

The human protein is homologous to Saccharomyces cerevisiae Cbf5p and Drosophila melanogaster Nop60B proteins, indicating strong evolutionary conservation.

== Clinical significance ==
Mutations in DKC1 cause X-linked dyskeratosis congenita, a rare inherited disorder characterized by defective telomere maintenance, premature aging, bone marrow failure, and increased cancer susceptibility. Both nucleotide substitutions and trinucleotide repeat polymorphisms have been identified in this gene. The pathogenic variants typically impair dyskerin function, disrupting rRNA modification and telomerase RNA stability, leading to the disease phenotype.

Mutations in DKC1 are also associated with Hoyeraal-Hreidarsson syndrome.
