= TerraCycle (bicycle) =

American bicycle company

- Industry: Bicycle (recumbent)
- Founded: 1996; 30 years ago in Portland, Oregon USA
- Founder: Pat Franz
- Headquarters: Portland, Oregon, USA
- Products: Recumbent bicycle parts
- Website: t-cycle.com

TerraCycle, Inc. is a designer and manufacturer of recumbent bicycle parts based in Portland, Oregon in the United States. TerraCycle is known for its idlers and Cargo Monster load-carrying extensions.

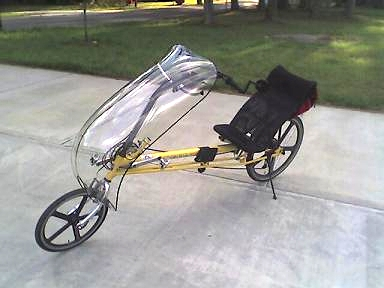
An example of a recumbent bicycle, fitted with a fairing.

== History ==
=== Background ===
In 1996, Pat Franz began making custom-fitted recumbent bicycles in a small office in Portland, Oregon. Recumbent cycling is a small market, so in order to make the bicycles, many of the parts had to be hand-crafted. Before long, other recumbent bicycle manufacturers noted TerraCycle's parts and began asking to have parts made for their own recumbent cycles. TerraCycle shifted its efforts from building whole recumbent bicycles to manufacturing recumbent cycling parts and has since gained international recognition in the recumbent cycling community. Today, TerraCycle parts can be found in stores in North America, Europe, Australia, Hong Kong, Japan, Korea and Taiwan and around the world online.

In late 2011, an upcycling company also named TerraCycle purchased the rights to www.terracycle.com, formerly held by the recumbent cycle part manufacturer. The new home of TerraCycle recumbent cycling https://t-cycle.com/.

=== Acquisitions ===
In December 2007, TerraCycle acquired FastBack Systems, a recumbent cycling hydration system and frame pack manufacturer out of Fort Collins, Colorado. Mike Vogl, the founder of FastBack, said in a press release: "We’ve grown quickly, and the demands of the business require increasing time and resources." TerraCycle has continued producing the lines of packs and bags, expanded the line to include other products and begun selling the FastBack line in Europe.

In December 2009, TerraCycle acquired WindWrap, a maker of fairings for recumbent cycles based in Eureka, California. The WindWrap line of fairings has been expanded and improved upon, and is now available in Europe.

In December 2011, Terracycle acquired Velogenesis, and began selling the seat strut clamps developed by Velogenesis founder, Ray Brick.

== Influence ==
=== Innovations in recumbent technology ===
TerraCycle's first bike, the TerraZa was known for its ground-breaking customizability. The TerraZa won the acclaim of Recumbent Cyclist News for being revolutionary: "This is the way we like to see recumbents built, the way more should be built and the way many high-end bikes will have to be built in the future."

The folding stem developed at TerraCycle has changed the way that other companies approach their products. Bacchetta Recumbent Bikes has adopted TerraCycle's GlideFlex folding stem as standard equipment.

The Cargo Monster, designed by TerraCycle in 2009, is a load-carrying extension that transforms the carrying ability of almost any recumbent cycle.

In 2011, TerraCycle's Sport Idlers won Accessory of the Year on BentRider Online.

=== Involvement in recumbent cycling culture ===
In 2005, TerraCycle sponsored the Race Across Oregon, when Robert Johnson of TerraCycle participated on the team RAO Speedwagon. The team used only recumbent cycles in what is ordinarily an upright bicycle competition. RAO Speedwagon finished first place in what was a big win for the recumbent cycling community, both in terms of promoting recumbent cycles and demonstrating their efficacy.

Over the years, TerraCycle has supplied idlers to various teams participating in the American Society of Mechanical Engineers Human Powered Vehicle Challenge. In 2005, the Oregon State University Human Powered Vehicle Team placed 5th overall with the help of TerraCycle parts.

Various events in the recumbent cycling community, like the evening event following the Oregon Human Powered Vehicle Challenge, are hosted at TerraCycle's workshop.
