= Intellectual Property Owners Association =

The Intellectual Property Owners Association (IPO) is a trade association that is composed of owners of intellectual property, represented mostly by in-house corporate counsel and private practice attorneys practicing in the field, and other parties interested in intellectual property law. According to the organization's website, the IPO is composed of over 125 companies spanning over 30 countries. Members are involved in the association either through their companies or as IPO inventor, author, executive, law firm or attorney members. IPO’s corporate members file about 30 percent of the patent applications filed in the USPTO each year by U.S. nationals.

The Association advocates for reforms of patent, trademark and other intellectual property laws (in front of Congress and the courts) that it believes will advantage its members and the users of intellectual property systems, and it is often consulted by governments to provide an opinion on proposed changes in law as bellwether for how the relevant communities will be impacted by the proposed change.

In addition, the Association provides continuing legal education (CLE) for attorneys in the IP field in a variety of conferences and seminars throughout the year.

As of 2025, Krish Gupta of Dell Technologies is the president of the organization.

== See also ==
- Intellectual property organization
