= Telomerase =

Telomere-restoring protein active in the most rapidly dividing cells

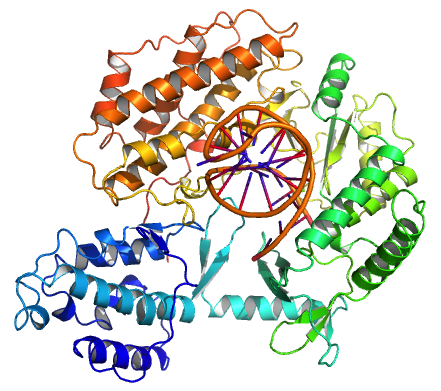
Telomerase catalytic subunit TERT of Tribolium castaneum (Red flour beetle), bound to putative RNA template and telomeric DNA (PDB 3KYL)

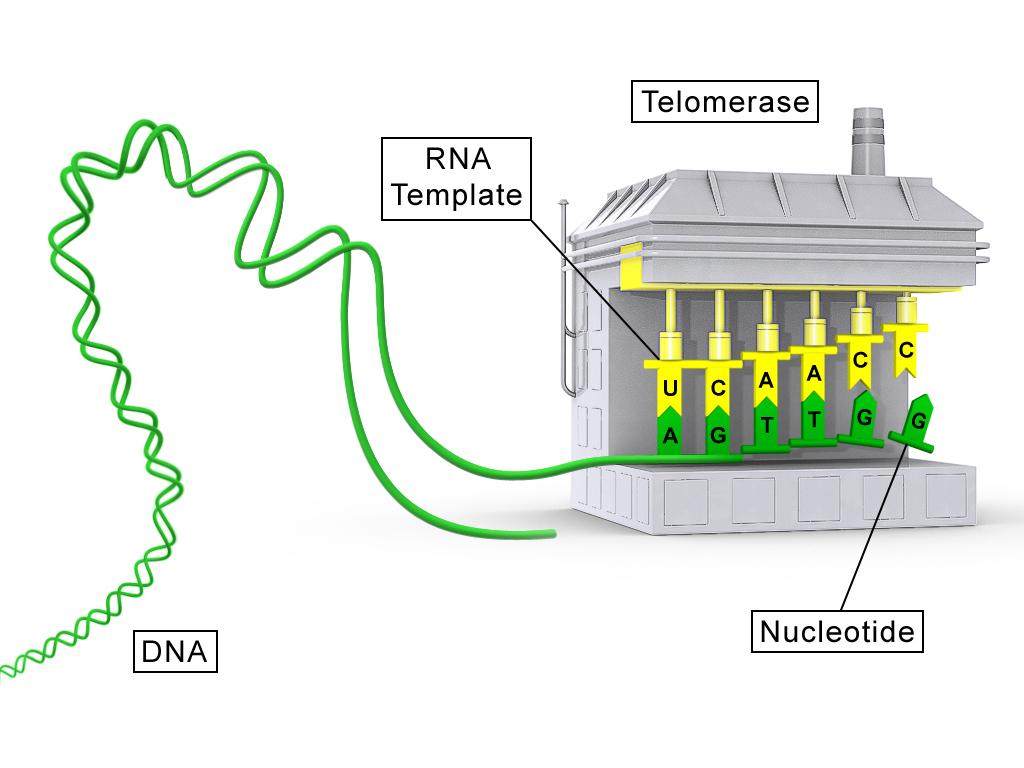
A conceptual diagram showing the protein component of telomerase (TERT) in grey and the RNA component (TR) in yellow

Telomerase, also called terminal transferase, is a ribonucleoprotein that adds a species-dependent telomere repeat sequence to the 3' end of telomeres. A telomere is a region of repetitive sequences at each end of the chromosomes of most eukaryotes. Telomeres protect the end of the chromosome from DNA damage or from fusion with neighbouring chromosomes. The fruit fly Drosophila melanogaster lacks telomerase, but instead uses retrotransposons to maintain telomeres.

Telomerase is a reverse transcriptase enzyme that carries its own RNA molecule (e.g., with the sequence 3′-CCCAAUCCC-5′ in Trypanosoma brucei) which is used as a template when it elongates telomeres. Telomerase is active in gametes and most cancer cells, but is normally absent in most somatic cells.

== History ==
The existence of a compensatory mechanism for telomere shortening was first found by Soviet biologist Alexey Olovnikov in 1973, who also suggested the telomere hypothesis of aging and the telomere's connections to cancer and perhaps some neurodegenerative diseases.

Telomerase in the ciliate Tetrahymena was discovered by Carol W. Greider and Elizabeth Blackburn in 1984. Together with Jack W. Szostak, Greider and Blackburn were awarded the 2009 Nobel Prize in Physiology or Medicine for their discovery. Later the cryo-EM structure of telomerase was first reported in T. thermophila, to be followed a few years later by the cryo-EM structure of telomerase in humans.

The role of telomeres and telomerase in cell aging and cancer was established by scientists at biotechnology company Geron with the cloning of the RNA and catalytic components of human telomerase and the development of a polymerase chain reaction (PCR) based assay for telomerase activity called the TRAP assay, which surveys telomerase activity in multiple types of cancer.

The negative stain electron microscopy (EM) structures of human and Tetrahymena telomerases were characterized in 2013. Two years later, the first cryo-electron microscopy (cryo-EM) structure of telomerase holoenzyme (Tetrahymena) was determined. In 2018, the structure of human telomerase was determined through cryo-EM by UC Berkeley scientists.

== Structure ==
=== The catalytic protein ===
The main catalytic protein in telomerase is telomerase reverse transcriptase, 2627 amino acids long in humans. The protein consists of four conserved domains (RNA-Binding Domain (TRBD), fingers, palm and thumb), organized into a "right hand" ring configuration that shares common features with retroviral reverse transcriptases, viral RNA replicases and bacteriophage B-family DNA polymerases.

TERT proteins from many eukaryotes have been sequenced.

=== The telomerase complex ===
The full human telomerase complex (the holoenzyme) consists of: one copy each of telomerase RNA (TR or TERC, 452 nucleotides), TERT, and TCAB1, plus two copies of the H/ACA ribonucleoprotein subcomplex. The H/ACA subcomplex consists of two copies each of dyskerin (DKC1), NHP2, NOP10 and GAR1. Each copy of the H/ACA subcomplex binds to a hairpin structure on the telomerase RNA, a feature specific to vertebrates. There is also a histone H2A-H2B dimer wrapping around the telomeric DNA as it operates and its presence is essential for the functioning of the telomerase complex. The presence of TPP1 and POT1 is not detected in the cryo-EM study, but based on previous studies they should be attached to TERT's TEN domain in a way analogous to p50 and Teb1 of Tetrahymena. Previous experiments on catalytically active complex extracted from immortal cells indicated two molecules each of human TERT, telomerase RNA, and dyskerin (DKC1).

For comparison, the Tetrahymena telomerase complex consists of: one copy each of TR (TER), TERT, p65 in the core; one copy of p50 (homolog of human TPP1) as the connection to the rest of the structure; one copy each of Teb1 (paralogous to human RPA70), Teb2, and Teb3 (altogether a RPA-like complex); and one copy each of p75, p45, p19 (a CST complex).

== Mechanism ==
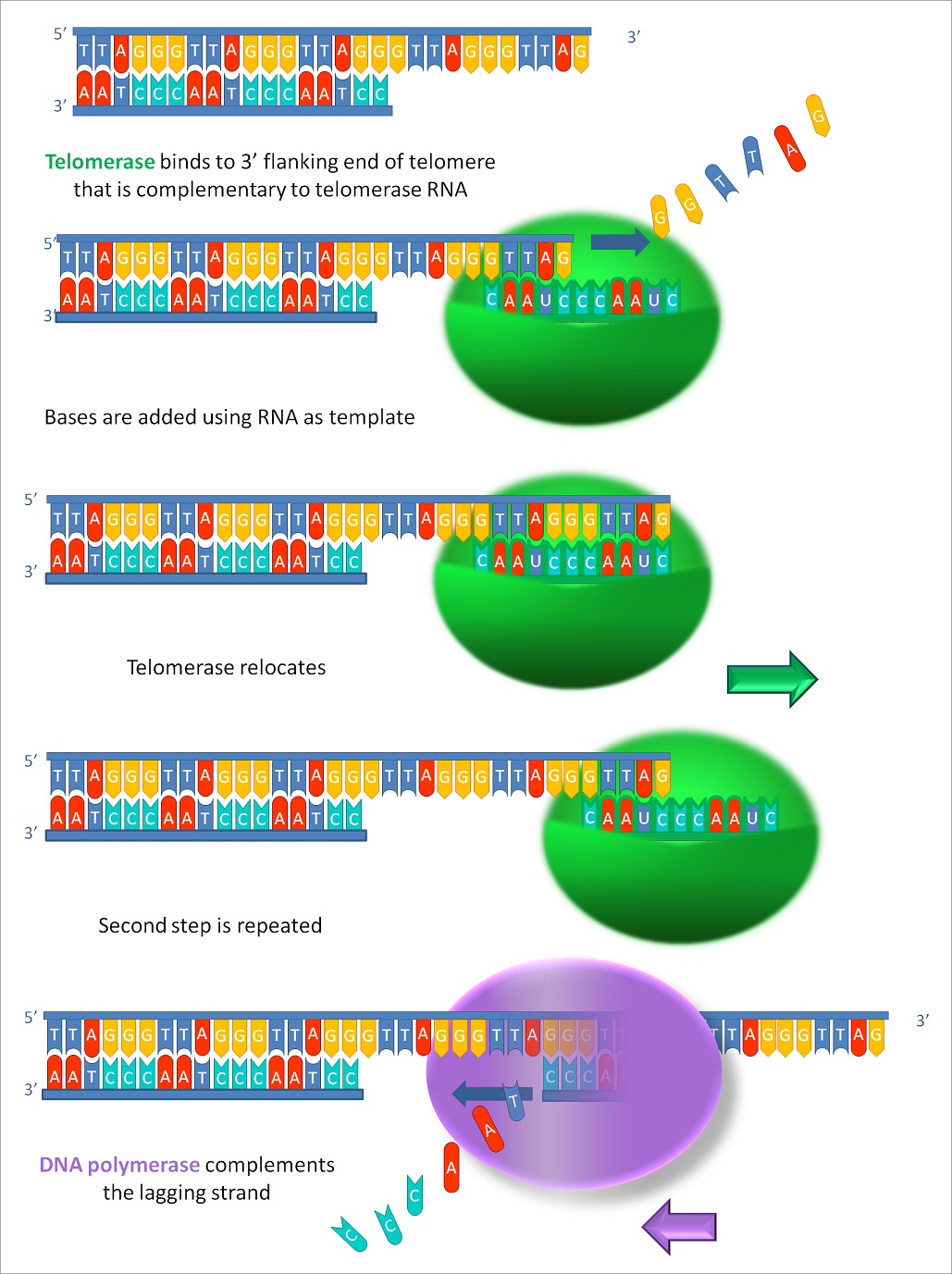
An image illustrating how telomerase elongates telomere ends progressively

The shelterin protein TPP1 is both necessary and sufficient to recruit the telomerase enzyme to telomeres, and is the only shelterin protein in direct contact with telomerase.

By using TERC, TERT can add a six-nucleotide repeating sequence, 5'-TTAGGG (in vertebrates; the sequence differs in other organisms) to the 3' strand of chromosomes. These TTAGGG repeats (with their various protein binding partners) are called telomeres. The template region of TERC is 3'-CAAUCCCAAUC-5'.

Telomerase can bind the first few nucleotides of the template to the last telomere sequence on the chromosome, add a new telomere repeat (5'-GGTTAG-3') sequence, let go, realign the new 3'-end of telomere to the template, and repeat the process. Telomerase reverses telomere shortening.

== Clinical implications ==
=== Aging ===
Telomerase restores short bits of DNA known as telomeres, which are otherwise shortened after repeated division of a cell via mitosis.

In normal circumstances, where telomerase is absent, if a cell divides recursively, at some point the progeny reach their Hayflick limit, which is believed to be between 50 and 70 cell divisions. At the limit the cells become senescent and cell division stops. Telomerase allows each offspring to replace the lost bit of DNA, allowing the cell line to divide without ever reaching the limit. This same unbounded growth is a feature of cancerous growth.

Embryonic stem cells express telomerase, which allows them to divide repeatedly and form the individual. In adults, telomerase is highly expressed only in cells that need to divide regularly, especially in male sperm cells, but also in epidermal cells, in activated T cell and B cell lymphocytes, as well as in certain adult stem cells, but in the great majority of cases somatic cells do not express telomerase.

A comparative biology study of mammalian telomeres indicated that telomere length of some mammalian species correlates inversely, rather than directly, with lifespan, and concluded that the contribution of telomere length to lifespan is unresolved. Telomere shortening does not occur with age in some postmitotic tissues, such as in the rat brain. In humans, skeletal muscle telomere lengths remain stable from ages 23–74. In baboon skeletal muscle, which consists of fully differentiated postmitotic cells, less than 3% of myonuclei contain damaged telomeres and this percentage does not increase with age. Thus, telomere shortening does not appear to be a major factor in the aging of the differentiated cells of brain or skeletal muscle. In human liver, cholangiocytes and hepatocytes show no age-related telomere shortening. Another study found little evidence that, in humans, telomere length is a significant biomarker of normal aging with respect to important cognitive and physical abilities.

Some experiments have raised questions on whether telomerase can be used as an anti-aging therapy, namely, the fact that mice with elevated levels of telomerase have higher cancer incidence and hence do not live longer. On the other hand, one study showed that activating telomerase in cancer-resistant mice by overexpressing its catalytic subunit extended lifespan. A study found that long-lived subjects inherited a hyperactive version of telomerase.

A telomerase activator TA-65 is commercially available and is claimed to delay aging and to provide relief from certain disease conditions. This formulation contains a molecule called cycloastragenol derived from a legume Astragalus membranaceus. Several other compounds have been found to increase telomerase activity: Centella asiatica extract 8.8-fold, oleanolic acid 5.9-fold, astragalus extract 4.3-fold, TA-65 2.2-fold, and maslinic acid 2-fold.

==== Premature aging ====
Premature aging syndromes including Werner syndrome, Progeria, Ataxia telangiectasia, Ataxia-telangiectasia like disorder, Bloom syndrome, Fanconi anemia and Nijmegen breakage syndrome are associated with short telomeres. However, the genes that have mutated in these diseases all have roles in the repair of DNA damage and the increased DNA damage may, itself, be a factor in the premature aging (see DNA damage theory of aging). An additional role in maintaining telomere length is an active area of investigation.

=== Cancer ===
In vitro, when cells approach the Hayflick limit, the time to senescence can be extended by inactivating the tumor suppressor proteins p53 and Retinoblastoma protein (pRb). Cells that have been so-altered eventually undergo an event termed a "crisis" when the majority of the cells in the culture die. Sometimes, a cell does not stop dividing once it reaches a crisis. In a typical situation, the telomeres are shortened and chromosomal integrity declines with every subsequent cell division. Exposed chromosome ends are interpreted as double-stranded breaks (DSB) in DNA; such damage is usually repaired by reattaching the broken ends together. When the cell does this due to telomere-shortening, the ends of different chromosomes can be attached to each other. This solves the problem of lacking telomeres, but during cell division anaphase, the fused chromosomes are randomly ripped apart, causing many mutations and chromosomal abnormalities. As this process continues, the cell's genome becomes unstable. Eventually, either fatal damage is done to the cell's chromosomes (killing it via apoptosis), or an additional mutation that activates telomerase occurs.

With telomerase activation some types of cells and their offspring become immortal (bypass the Hayflick limit), thus avoiding cell death as long as the conditions for their duplication are met. Many cancer cells are considered 'immortal' because telomerase activity allows them to live much longer than any other somatic cell, which, combined with uncontrollable cell proliferation is why they can form tumors. A good example of immortal cancer cells is HeLa cells, which have been used in laboratories as a model cell line since 1951.

While this method of modelling human cancer in cell culture is effective and has been used for many years by scientists, it is also very imprecise. The exact changes that allow for the formation of the tumorigenic clones in the above-described experiment are not clear. Scientists addressed this question by the serial introduction of multiple mutations present in a variety of human cancers. This has led to the identification of mutation combinations that form tumorigenic cells in a variety of cell types. While the combination varies by cell type, the following alterations are required in all cases: TERT activation, loss of p53 pathway function, loss of pRb pathway function, activation of the Ras or myc proto-oncogenes, and aberration of the Protein phosphatase 2 (PP2A). That is to say, the cell has an activated telomerase, eliminating the process of death by chromosome instability or loss, absence of apoptosis-induction pathways, and continued mitosis activation.

This model of cancer in cell culture accurately describes the role of telomerase in actual human tumors. Telomerase activation has been observed in ~90% of all human tumors, suggesting that the immortality conferred by telomerase plays a key role in cancer development. Of the tumors without TERT activation, most employ a separate pathway to maintain telomere length termed Alternative Lengthening of Telomeres (ALT). The presence of this alternative pathway was first described in an SV40 virus-transformed human cell line, and based on the dynamics of the changes in telomere length, was proposed to result through recombination. However, the exact mechanism remains unclear.

Elizabeth Blackburn et al. identified the upregulation of 70 genes known or suspected in cancer growth and spread through the body, and the activation of glycolysis, which enables cancer cells to rapidly use sugar to facilitate their programmed growth rate (roughly the growth rate of a fetus).

Approaches to controlling telomerase and telomeres for cancer therapy include gene therapy, immunotherapy, small-molecule and signal pathway inhibitors.

==== Drugs ====
The ability to maintain functional telomeres may be one mechanism that allows cancer cells to grow in vitro for decades. Telomerase activity is necessary to preserve many cancer types and is inactive in somatic cells, creating the possibility that telomerase inhibition could selectively repress cancer cell growth with minimal side effects. If a drug can inhibit telomerase in cancer cells, the telomeres of successive generations will progressively shorten, limiting tumor growth.

Telomerase is a good biomarker for cancer detection because about 85% of human cancer cells express high levels of it. Telomerase activity can be identified by its catalytic protein domain (hTERT). hTERT is believed to be the rate-limiting step in telomerase activity, and as a consequence, increased hTERT expression is associated with elevated telomerase activity in many cancer types. Various cancer cells and fibroblasts transformed with hTERT cDNA have high telomerase activity, while somatic cells do not. Cells testing positive for hTERT have positive nuclear signals. Epithelial stem cell tissue and its early daughter cells are the only noncancerous cells in which hTERT can be detected. Since hTERT expression is dependent only on the number of tumor cells within a sample, the amount of hTERT indicates the severity of cancer.

The expression of hTERT can also be used to distinguish benign tumors from malignant tumors. Malignant tumors have higher hTERT expression than benign tumors. Although developing, telomerase inhibition within malignant cancer cells can theoretically be used as a potential treatment. Real-time reverse transcription polymerase chain reaction (RT-PCR) quantifying hTERT expression in various tumor samples verified this varying expression.

Telomeres in non-cancerous human cells are generally longer than in cancer cells, and telomerase-inhibiting therapy aims to selectively suppress telomerase activity in cancer cells while preserving normal telomerase activity in non-tumor cells. Telomere-targeted treatments include oligonucleotides, nucleosides, small molecule inhibitors, and more. Various natural compounds have been identified as having telomerase inhibitory properties, such as oleic acid, a fatty acid found in vegetable and animal oils.

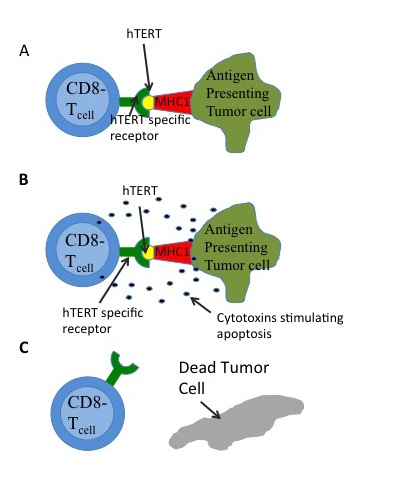
Figure 4:A) Tumor cells expressing hTERT will actively degrade some of the protein and process for presenting. The major histocompatibility complex 1(MHC1), can then present the hTERT epitote. CD8- T cells that have antigen-specific T cell receptors against hTERT will then bind to the presented epitote. B) As a result of the antigenic binding, the T cells will release cytotoxins, which can be absorbed by the affected cell. C) These cytotoxins induce multiple proteases and result in apoptosis (or cell death).

The lack of telomerase does not affect cell growth until the telomeres are short enough to cause cells to "die or undergo growth arrest". However, inhibiting telomerase alone is not enough to destroy large tumors. It must be combined with surgery, radiation, chemotherapy or immunotherapy.

Cells may reduce their telomere length by only 50–252 base pairs per cell division, which can lead to a long lag phase.

==== Immunotherapy ====
Immunotherapy successfully treats some kinds of cancer, such as melanoma. This treatment involves manipulating a human's immune system to destroy cancerous cells. Humans have two major antigen identifying lymphocytes: CD8+ cytotoxic T-lymphocytes (CTL) and CD4+ helper T-lymphocytes that can destroy cells. Antigen receptors on CTL can bind to a 9–10 amino acid chain that is presented by the major histocompatibility complex (MHC) as in Figure 4. HTERT is a potential target antigen. Immunotargeting should result in relatively few side effects since hTERT expression is associated only with telomerase and is not essential in almost all somatic cells. GV1001 uses this pathway. Experimental drug and vaccine therapies targeting active telomerase have been tested in mouse models, and clinical trials have begun. One drug, imetelstat, is being clinically researched as a means of interfering with telomerase in cancer cells. Most of the harmful cancer-related effects of telomerase are dependent on an intact RNA template. Cancer stem cells that use an alternative method of telomere maintenance are still killed when telomerase's RNA template is blocked or damaged.

==== Telomerase Vaccines ====
Two telomerase vaccines have been developed: GRNVAC1 and GV1001. GRNVAC1 isolates dendritic cells and the RNA that codes for the telomerase protein and puts them back into the patient to make cytotoxic T cells that kill the telomerase-active cells. GV1001 is a peptide from the active site of hTERT and is recognized by the immune system that reacts by killing the telomerase-active cells.

==== Targeted apoptosis ====
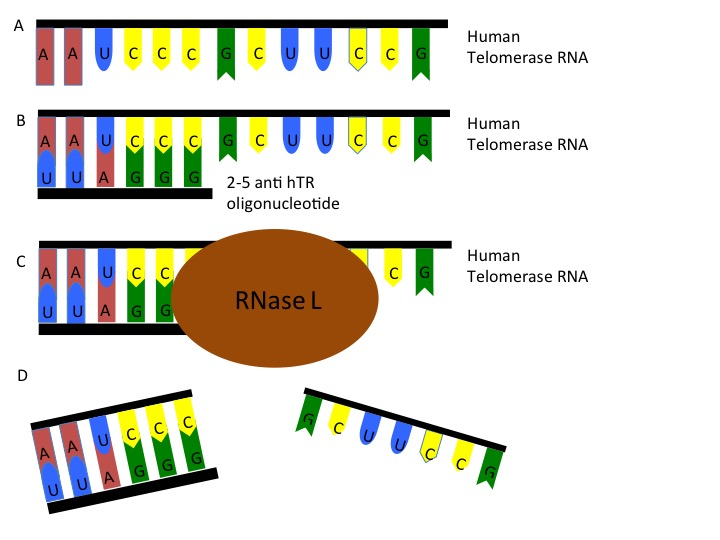
Figure 5: A) Human telomerase RNA (hTR) is present in the cell and can be targeted. B) 2-5 anti-hTR oligonucleotides is a specialized antisense oligo that can bind to the telomerase RNA. C) Once bound, the 2-5 anti-hTR oligonucleotide recruits RNase L to the sequence. Once recruited, the RNase L creates a single cleavage in the RNA (D) and causes dissociation of the RNA sequence.

Another independent approach is to use oligoadenylated anti-telomerase antisense oligonucleotides and ribozymes to target telomerase RNA, leading to the dissociation of the RNA and to apoptosis (Figure 5). The fast induction of apoptosis through antisense binding may be a good alternative to the slower telomere shortening.

==== Small interfering RNA (siRNA) ====
siRNAs are small RNA molecules that induce the sequence-specific degradation of other RNAs. siRNA treatment can function similar to traditional gene therapy by destroying the mRNA products of particular genes, and therefore preventing the expression of those genes. A 2012 study found that targeting TERC with an siRNA reduced telomerase activity by more than 50% and resulted in decreased viability of immortal cancer cells. Treatment with both the siRNA and radiation caused a greater reduction in tumor size in mice than treatment with radiation alone, suggesting that targeting telomerase could be a way to increase the efficacy of radiation in treating radiation-resistant tumors.

=== Heart disease, diabetes and quality of life ===
Blackburn also discovered that mothers caring for very sick children have shorter telomeres when they report that their emotional stress is at a maximum and that telomerase was active at the site of blockages in coronary artery tissue, possibly accelerating heart attacks.

In 2009, it was shown that the amount of telomerase activity significantly increased following psychological stress. Across the sample of patients telomerase activity in peripheral blood mononuclear cells increased by 18% one hour after the end of the stress.

A study in 2010 found that there was "significantly greater" telomerase activity in participants than controls after a three-month meditation retreat.

Telomerase deficiency has been linked to diabetes mellitus and impaired insulin secretion in mice, due to loss of pancreatic insulin-producing cells.

=== Rare human diseases ===
Mutations in TERT have been implicated in predisposing patients to aplastic anemia, a disorder in which the bone marrow fails to produce blood cells, in 2005.

Cri du chat syndrome (CdCS) is a complex disorder involving the loss of the distal portion of the short arm of chromosome 5. TERT is located in the deleted region, and loss of one copy of TERT has been suggested as a cause or contributing factor of this disease.

Dyskeratosis congenita (DC) is a disease of the bone marrow that can be caused by some mutations in the telomerase subunits. In the DC cases, about 35% cases are X-linked-recessive on the DKC1 locus and 5% cases are autosomal dominant on the TERT and TERC loci.

Patients with DC have severe bone marrow failure manifesting as abnormal skin pigmentation, leucoplakia (a white thickening of the oral mucosa) and nail dystrophy, as well as a variety of other symptoms. Individuals with either TERC or DKC1 mutations have shorter telomeres and defective telomerase activity in vitro versus other individuals of the same age.

In one family autosomal dominant DC was linked to a heterozygous TERT mutation. These patients also exhibited an increased rate of telomere-shortening, and genetic anticipation (i.e., the DC phenotype worsened with each generation).

== See also ==
- DNA repair
- Imetelstat
- Telomere
- Epitalon
