= Somatic (biology) =

Biological term for all non-reproductive bodily cells

In cellular biology, the term somatic is derived from the French somatique which comes from the Ancient Greek σωματικός (sōmatikós, 'bodily') and σῶμα (sôma, 'body'). It is often used to refer to the cells of the body, in contrast to the reproductive (germline) cells, which usually give rise to the egg or sperm (or other gametes in other organisms). These somatic cells are diploid, containing two copies of each chromosome, whereas germ cells are haploid, as they only contain one copy of each chromosome (in preparation for fertilisation). Although under normal circumstances all somatic cells in an organism contain identical DNA, they develop a variety of tissue-specific characteristics. This process is called differentiation, through epigenetic and regulatory alterations. The grouping of similar cells and tissues creates the foundation for organs.

Somatic mutations are changes to the genetics of a multicellular organism that are not passed on to its offspring through the germline. Most cancers are due to somatic mutations.

Somatic is also defined as relating to the wall of the body cavity, particularly as distinguished from the head, limbs, or viscera. It is also used in the term somatic nervous system, which is the portion of the vertebrate nervous system that regulates voluntary movements of the body.

== Mutation frequency ==
The frequency of mutations in mouse somatic tissue (brain, liver, Sertoli cells) was compared to the mutation frequency in male germline cells at sequential stages of spermatogenesis. The spontaneous mutation frequency was found to be significantly higher (5 to 10-fold) in the somatic cell types than in the male germline cells. In female mice, somatic cells were also found to have a higher mutation frequency than germline cells. It was suggested that elevated levels of DNA repair enzymes play a prominent role in the lower mutation frequency of male and female germline cells, and that enhanced genetic integrity is a fundamental characteristic of germline cells. DNA repair processes can remove DNA damages that would, otherwise, upon DNA replication, cause mutation.

== See also ==
- Soma (biology), the bulbous end of a neuron, containing the cell nucleus
