= Nucleolar protein, member A1 =

Protein-coding gene in humans

GAR1

Identifiers
- Aliases: GAR1, NOLA1, Nucleolar protein, member A1, GAR1 ribonucleoprotein
- External IDs: OMIM: 606468; MGI: 1930948; GeneCards: GAR1

Gene location (Human)
Chr.	Chromosome 4 (human)
Band	4q25	Start	109,815,510 bp
Band	4q25	End	109,824,740 bp

Gene location (Mouse)
Chr.	Chromosome 3 (mouse)
Band	3|3 G3	Start	129,618,561 bp
Band	3|3 G3	End	129,625,045 bp
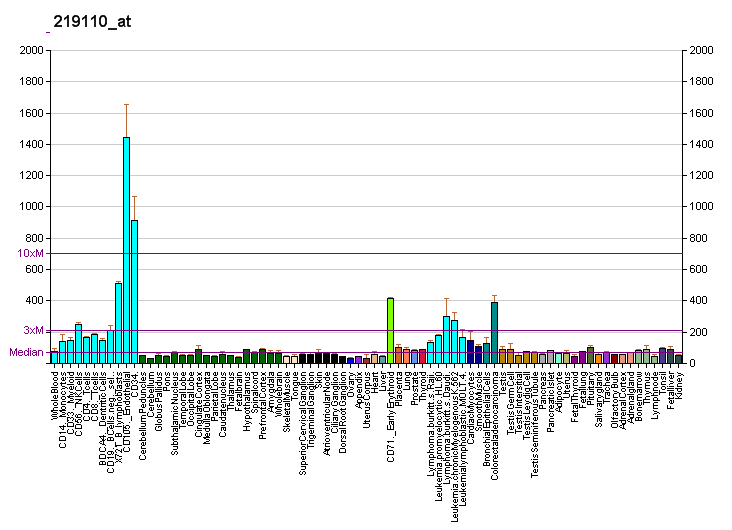
RNA expression pattern
Bgee	Human / Mouse (ortholog); Top expressed in: tendon of biceps brachii; parotid gland; amniotic fluid; internal globus pallidus; germinal epithelium; epithelium of nasopharynx; endometrium; hair follicle; gingival epithelium; oral cavity / Top expressed in: Ileal epithelium; otic placode; primitive streak; otic vesicle; yolk sac; saccule; epiblast; zygote; tail of embryo; hair follicle; More reference expression data
BioGPS	More reference expression data
Gene ontology
Molecular function	protein binding; telomerase RNA binding; box H/ACA snoRNA binding; RNA binding
Cellular component	box H/ACA snoRNP complex; Cajal body; box H/ACA telomerase RNP complex; box H/ACA scaRNP complex; nucleus; telomerase holoenzyme complex; nucleoplasm; fibrillar center; nucleolus
Biological process	rRNA processing; pseudouridine synthesis; telomere maintenance via telomerase; ribosome biogenesis; rRNA pseudouridine synthesis; snoRNA guided rRNA pseudouridine synthesis
Sources:Amigo / QuickGO
Orthologs
Databases	NCBI: entry; OMA: entry
Species	Human	Mouse
Entrez	54433	68147
Ensembl	ENSG00000109534	ENSMUSG00000028010
UniProt	Q9NY12	Q9CY66
RefSeq (mRNA)	NM_032993; NM_018983	NM_026578
RefSeq (protein)	NP_061856; NP_127460	NP_080854
Location (UCSC)	Chr 4: 109.82 – 109.82 Mb	Chr 3: 129.62 – 129.63 Mb
PubMed search
- Wikidata
View/Edit Human	View/Edit Mouse

Nucleolar protein, member A1, also called H/ACA ribonucleoprotein complex subunit 1, is a protein that in humans is encoded by the GAR1 gene (previously NOLA1).

== Function ==
This gene is a member of the H/ACA snoRNPs (small nucleolar ribonucleoproteins) gene family. snoRNPs are involved in various aspects of rRNA processing and modification and have been classified into two families: C/D and H/ACA. The H/ACA snoRNPs also include the DKC1, NOLA2 and NOLA3 proteins. These four H/ACA snoRNP proteins localize to the dense fibrillar components of nucleoli and to coiled (Cajal) bodies in the nucleus. Both 18S rRNA production and rRNA pseudouridylation are impaired if any one of the four proteins is depleted. These four H/ACA snoRNP proteins are also components of the telomerase complex. The encoded protein of this gene contains two glycine- and arginine-rich domains and is related to Saccharomyces cerevisiae Gar1p. Two splice variants have been found for this gene.

== Interactions ==
Nucleolar protein, member A1 has been shown to interact with SMN1.
