= Astellas Institute for Regenerative Medicine =

Subsidiary of Astellas Pharma

- Type: Subsidiary
- Industry: Biotechnology
- Founded: 1994
- Headquarters: Marlborough, MA
- Products: Stem cell therapies for macular degeneration (human safety trial started in 2010), retinis pigmentosa, glaucoma and corneal blindness
- Website: Official website

Astellas Institute for Regenerative Medicine is a subsidiary of Astellas Pharma located in Marlborough, Massachusetts, US, developing stem cell therapies with a focus on diseases that cause blindness. It was formed in 1994 as a company named Advanced Cell Technology, Incorporated (ACT), which was renamed to Ocata Therapeutics in November 2014. In February 2016 Ocata was acquired by Astellas for US$379 million.

== History ==
Advanced Cell Technology was formed in 1994 and was led from 2005 to late 2010 by William M. Caldwell IV, Chairman and Chief Executive Officer. Upon Mr. Caldwell's death on December 13, 2010, Gary Rabin, a member of ACT's board of directors with experience in investment and capital raising, assumed the role of chairman and CEO.

In 2007 the company's Chief Scientific Officer (CSO), Michael D. West, PhD, also founder of Geron left Ocata to join a regenerative medicine firm, BioTime as CEO. In 2008, for $250,000 plus royalties up to a total of $1 million, the company licensed its "ACTCellerate" technology to BioTime. Robert Lanza was appointed CSO.

On November 22, 2010, the company announced that it had received approval from the U.S. Food and Drug Administration (FDA) to initiate the first human clinical trial using embryonic stem cells to treat retinal diseases. A preliminary report of the trial published in 2012, and a follow-up article was published in February 2015.

In July 2014, Ocata announced that Paul K. Wotton, previously of Antares Pharma Inc (ATRS:NASDAQ CM), became president and chief executive officer.

On August 27, 2014, Ocata announced a 1-100 reverse stock split of its common stock. Ocata was listed on NASDAQ in February 2015.

== Research ==
=== Macular degeneration ===
On November 30, 2010, Ocata filed an Investigational New Drug application with the U.S. FDA for the first clinical trial using embryonic stem cells to regenerate retinal pigment epithelium to treat Dry Age-Related Macular Degeneration (Dry AMD). Dry AMD is the most common form of macular degeneration and represents a market size of $25–30 Billion in the U.S. and Europe.

=== Stargardt's disease ===
In November 2010 the FDA allowed Ocata to begin a Phase I/II human clinical trial to use its retinal pigment epithelium cell therapy to treat Stargardt disease, a form of inherited juvenile macular degeneration.

== See also ==
- Key stem cell research events
- Somatic cell nuclear transfer
- Stem cells without embryonic destruction
