= Niles, Michigan =

- City
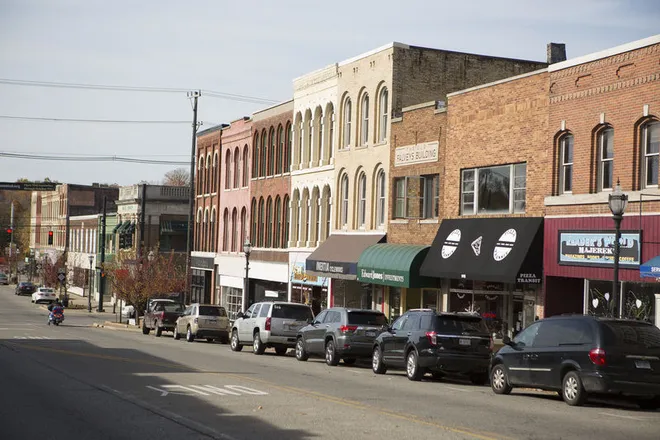
- A view of downtown Niles

- Seal
- Nickname: The City of Four Flags
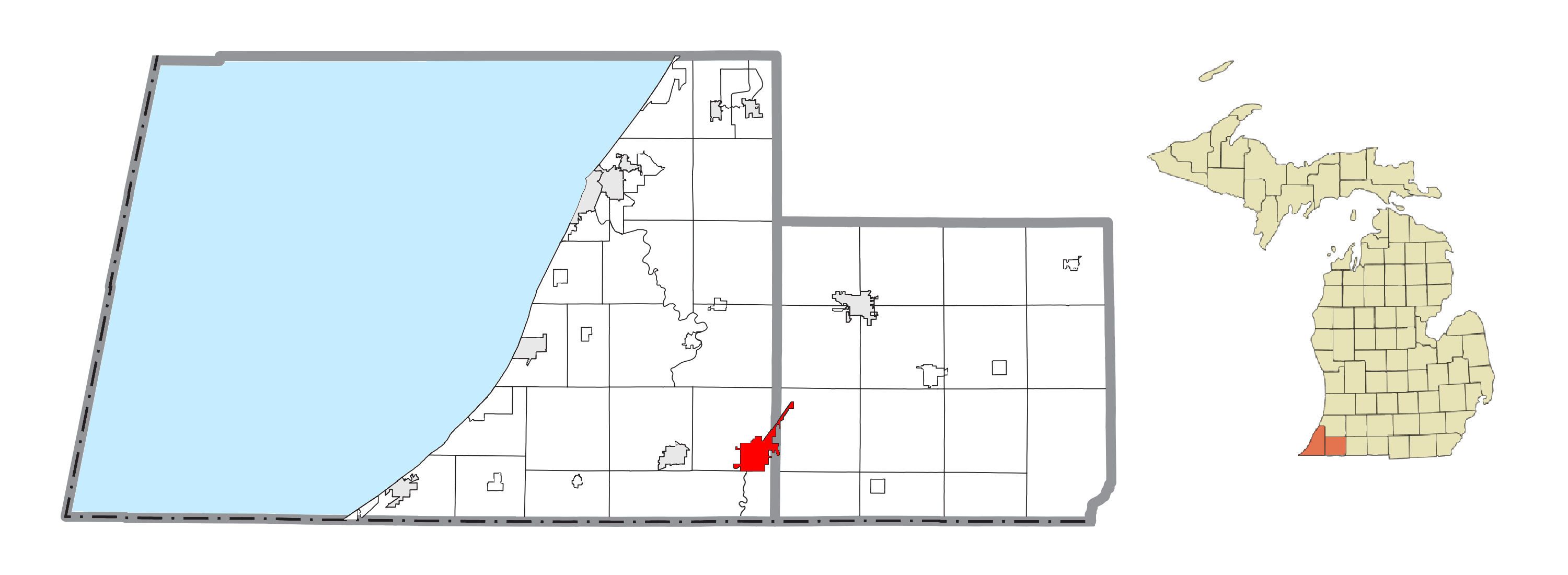
- Location within Berrien County (left) and Cass County (right)

- Location within the state of Michigan#Location within the United States Niles (the United States)
- Coordinates: 41°49′48″N 86°15′15″W
- Country: United States
- State: Michigan
- Counties: Berrien and Cass
- Settled: 1691 (Fort St. Joseph)
- Incorporated: 1835 (village); 1859 (city)

Government
  - Type: Mayor–council
  - Mayor: Nick Shelton
  - Administrator: Ric Huff

Area
  - Total: 5.95 sq mi (15.42 km^{2})
  - Land: 5.80 sq mi (15.01 km^{2})
  - Water: 0.16 sq mi (0.41 km^{2})
- Elevation: 686 ft (209 m)

Population (2020)
  - Total: 11,988
  - Density: 2,068.9/sq mi (798.79/km^{2})
- Time zone: UTC-5 (Eastern (EST))
  - Summer (DST): UTC-4 (EDT)
- ZIP code(s): 49120, 49121
- Area code: 269
- FIPS code: 26-57760
- GNIS feature ID: 0633412
- Website: www.nilesmi.org

Niles is a city in Berrien and Cass counties in the U.S. state of Michigan, near the Indiana state line city of South Bend. The population was 11,988 according to the 2020 census. It is the larger, by population, of the two principal cities in the Niles-Benton Harbor metropolitan area, an area with 153,797 people.

== History ==
Niles lies on the banks of the St. Joseph River, at the site of the French Fort St. Joseph, which was built in 1697 to protect the Jesuit Mission established in 1691. After 1761, it was held by the British and was captured on May 25, 1763, by Native Americans during Pontiac's Rebellion. The British retook the fort but it was not re-garrisoned and served as a trading post. During the American Revolutionary War, the fort was held for a short time by a Spanish force. The occupation of the fort by the four nations of France, Britain, Spain, and the United States has earned Niles the nickname City of Four Flags.

The town was named after Hezekiah Niles, editor of the Niles Register, a Baltimore newspaper. The town of Niles as it exists today was settled in 1827. Between 1820 and 1865, Niles was an integral part of the Underground Railroad, helping slaves escape from as far south as New Orleans through the Heartland, and eventually into Canada.

== Geography ==
The city is situated on the St. Joseph River and is mostly surrounded by Niles Township. Glacial deposits of large boulders and smooth stones mingle with heavy sedimentary deposits, producing rolling hills and steep river banks. The soil is rich and fertile. Crinoid and related fossils are easily found south of the city.

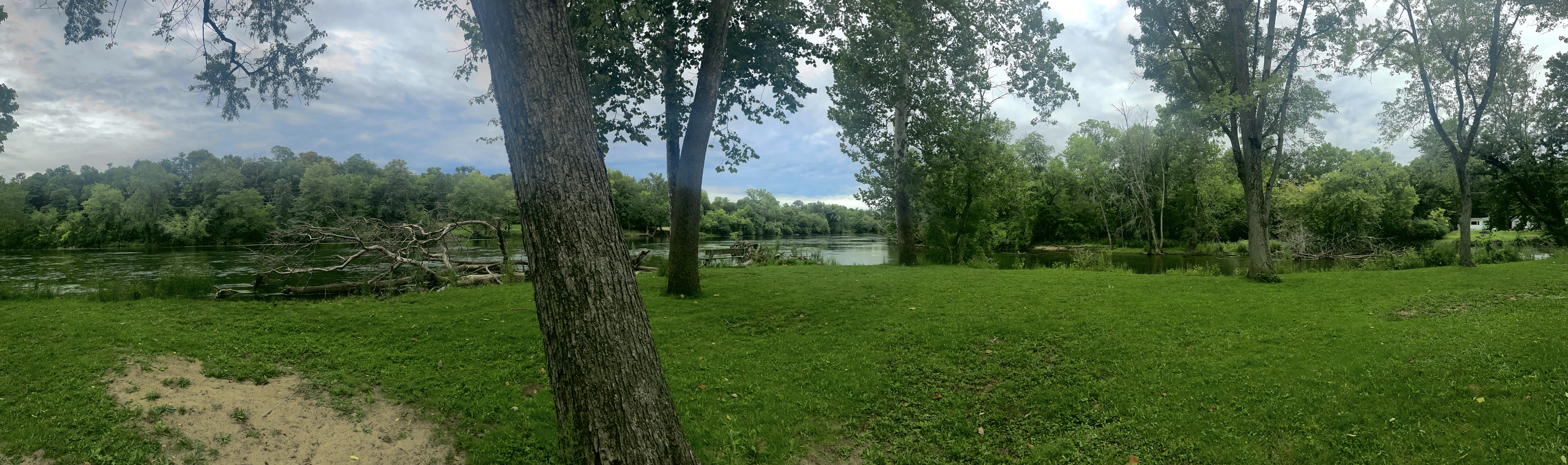
The riparian environment present on Island Park is reflective of this area around the river valley.

According to the United States Census Bureau, the city has a total area of 5.95 square miles (15.41 km^{2}), of which 5.79 square miles (15.00 km^{2}) is land and 0.16 square miles (0.41 km^{2}) is water.

=== Climate ===
Climate data for Niles. Michigan
Month	Jan	Feb	Mar	Apr	May	Jun	Jul	Aug	Sep	Oct	Nov	Dec	Year
Record high °F (°C)	49 (9)	43 (6)	76 (24)	83 (28)	89 (32)	88 (31)	92 (33)	92 (33)	90 (32)	86 (30)	71 (22)	56 (13)	92 (33)
Mean daily maximum °F (°C)	29.3 (−1.5)	32.2 (0.1)	52.1 (11.2)	65.5 (18.6)	71.1 (21.7)	78.9 (26.1)	85.2 (29.6)	80.5 (26.9)	73.7 (23.2)	60.6 (15.9)	52.1 (11.2)	32.2 (0.1)	59.4 (15.2)
Mean daily minimum °F (°C)	19.0 (−7.2)	21.9 (−5.6)	31.8 (−0.1)	42.8 (6.0)	52.0 (11.1)	60.9 (16.1)	65.3 (18.5)	62.4 (16.9)	54.0 (12.2)	41.9 (5.5)	34.2 (1.2)	21.5 (−5.8)	42.3 (5.7)
Record low °F (°C)	1 (−17)	6 (−14)	18 (−8)	31 (−1)	31 (−1)	48 (9)	48 (9)	44 (7)	40 (4)	30 (−1)	20 (−7)	5 (−15)	−21 (−29)
Average precipitation inches (mm)	2.34 (59)	1.97 (50)	2.76 (70)	3.53 (90)	3.98 (101)	3.90 (99)	3.45 (88)	3.84 (98)	3.92 (100)	3.46 (88)	3.45 (88)	3.19 (81)	39.79 (1,011)
Average snowfall inches (cm)	17.8 (45)	11.4 (29)	6.8 (17)	1.6 (4.1)	0 (0)	0 (0)	0 (0)	0 (0)	0 (0)	0.4 (1.0)	6.8 (17)	17.2 (44)	62.0 (157)
Average precipitation days (≥ 0.01 in)	16.2	11.6	12.4	13.2	11.4	10.3	9.8	10.1	10.6	11.3	13.7	15.8	146.5
Average snowy days (≥ 0.1 in)	13.1	8.1	4.8	1.5	0	0	0	0	0	0.3	4.7	10.6	43.2
Source 1: Midwestern Regional Climate Center (normals 1971−2000)
Source 2: Weatherbase

== Demographics ==
Historical population
Census	Pop.	Note	%±
1870	4,630		—
1880	4,197		−9.4%
1890	4,197		0.0%
1900	4,287		2.1%
1910	5,156		20.3%
1920	7,311		41.8%
1930	11,326		54.9%
1940	11,328		0.0%
1950	13,145		16.0%
1960	13,842		5.3%
1970	12,988		−6.2%
1980	13,115		1.0%
1990	12,458		−5.0%
2000	12,204		−2.0%
2010	11,600		−4.9%
2020	11,988		3.3%
U.S. Decennial Census

=== 2020 census ===
As of the 2020 census, Niles had a population of 11,988. The median age was 37.9 years. 23.9% of residents were under the age of 18 and 17.1% of residents were 65 years of age or older. For every 100 females there were 91.0 males, and for every 100 females age 18 and over there were 88.6 males age 18 and over.

100.0% of residents lived in urban areas, while 0.0% lived in rural areas.

There were 5,015 households in Niles, of which 28.4% had children under the age of 18 living in them. Of all households, 32.7% were married-couple households, 22.7% were households with a male householder and no spouse or partner present, and 34.7% were households with a female householder and no spouse or partner present. About 36.2% of all households were made up of individuals and 14.6% had someone living alone who was 65 years of age or older.

There were 5,518 housing units, of which 9.1% were vacant. The homeowner vacancy rate was 2.5% and the rental vacancy rate was 6.7%.

Racial composition as of the 2020 census
Race	Number	Percent
White	8,945	74.6%
Black or African American	1,301	10.9%
American Indian and Alaska Native	112	0.9%
Asian	115	1.0%
Native Hawaiian and Other Pacific Islander	8	0.1%
Some other race	400	3.3%
Two or more races	1,107	9.2%
Hispanic or Latino (of any race)	868	7.2%

=== 2010 census ===
As of the census of 2010, there were 11,600 people, 4,806 households, and 2,836 families residing in the city. The population density was 2,003.5 inhabitants per square mile (773.6/km^{2}). There were 5,428 housing units at an average density of 937.5 per square mile (362.0/km^{2}). The racial makeup of the city was 80.3% White, 12.4% African American, 0.6% Native American, 0.6% Asian, 0.1% Pacific Islander, 1.5% from other races, and 4.5% from two or more races. Hispanic or Latino of any race were 5.7% of the population.

There were 4,806 households, of which 32.2% had children under the age of 18 living with them, 35.8% were married couples living together, 17.7% had a female householder with no husband present, 5.5% had a male householder with no wife present, and 41.0% were non-families. 34.8% of all households were made up of individuals, and 12.4% had someone living alone who was 65 years of age or older. The average household size was 2.37 and the average family size was 3.05.

The median age in the city was 36.1 years. 25.6% of residents were under the age of 18; 9.1% were between the ages of 18 and 24; 26.6% were from 25 to 44; 24.4% were from 45 to 64; and 14.4% were 65 years of age or older. The gender makeup of the city was 47.1% male and 52.9% female.

=== 2000 census ===
As of the census of 2000, there were 12,204 people, 5,096 households, and 3,052 families residing in the city. The population density was 2,109.5 inhabitants per square mile (814.5/km^{2}). There were 5,531 housing units at an average density of 956.0 per square mile (369.1/km^{2}). The racial makeup of the city was 82.19% White, 12.36% African American, 0.66% Native American, 0.52% Asian, 0.08% Pacific Islander, 1.26% from other races, and 2.93% from two or more races. Hispanic or Latino of any race were 3.97% of the population.

There were 5,096 households, out of which 30.8% had children under the age of 18 living with them, 39.2% were married couples living together, 16.3% had a female householder with no husband present, and 40.1% were non-families. 34.3% of all households were made up of individuals, and 13.8% had someone living alone who was 65 years of age or older. The average household size was 2.35 and the average family size was 3.02.

In the city, the population was spread out, with 26.9% under the age of 18, 8.8% from 18 to 24, 28.1% from 25 to 44, 20.8% from 45 to 64, and 15.4% who were 65 years of age or older. The median age was 35 years. For every 100 females, there were 87.9 males. For every 100 females age 18 and over, there were 80.9 males.

The median income for a household in the city was $31,208, and the median income for a family was $38,870. Males had a median income of $31,395 versus $22,991 for females. The per capita income for the city was $16,584. About 9.9% of families and 13.6% of the population were below the poverty line, including 17.8% of those under age 18 and 7.2% of those age 65 or over.

== Attractions ==
The Fort St. Joseph Museum, the former carriage house of the Victorian Chapin Mansion.

Chapin Mansion, built by Henry A. Chapin and formerly serving as Niles City Hall, is located downtown.

The Riverfront Park in Niles stretches about a mile and a half of the St. Joseph River. The park and the immediate surrounding down town area is the main stage for many of the city's seasonal cultural events, including the Niles Riverfest, the Bluegrass Festival, the Hunter Ice Festival, and the Apple Festival Parade. The park also includes the Armed Forces Memorial, public stage, City's free skateboard park, playground, and sand volleyball courts.

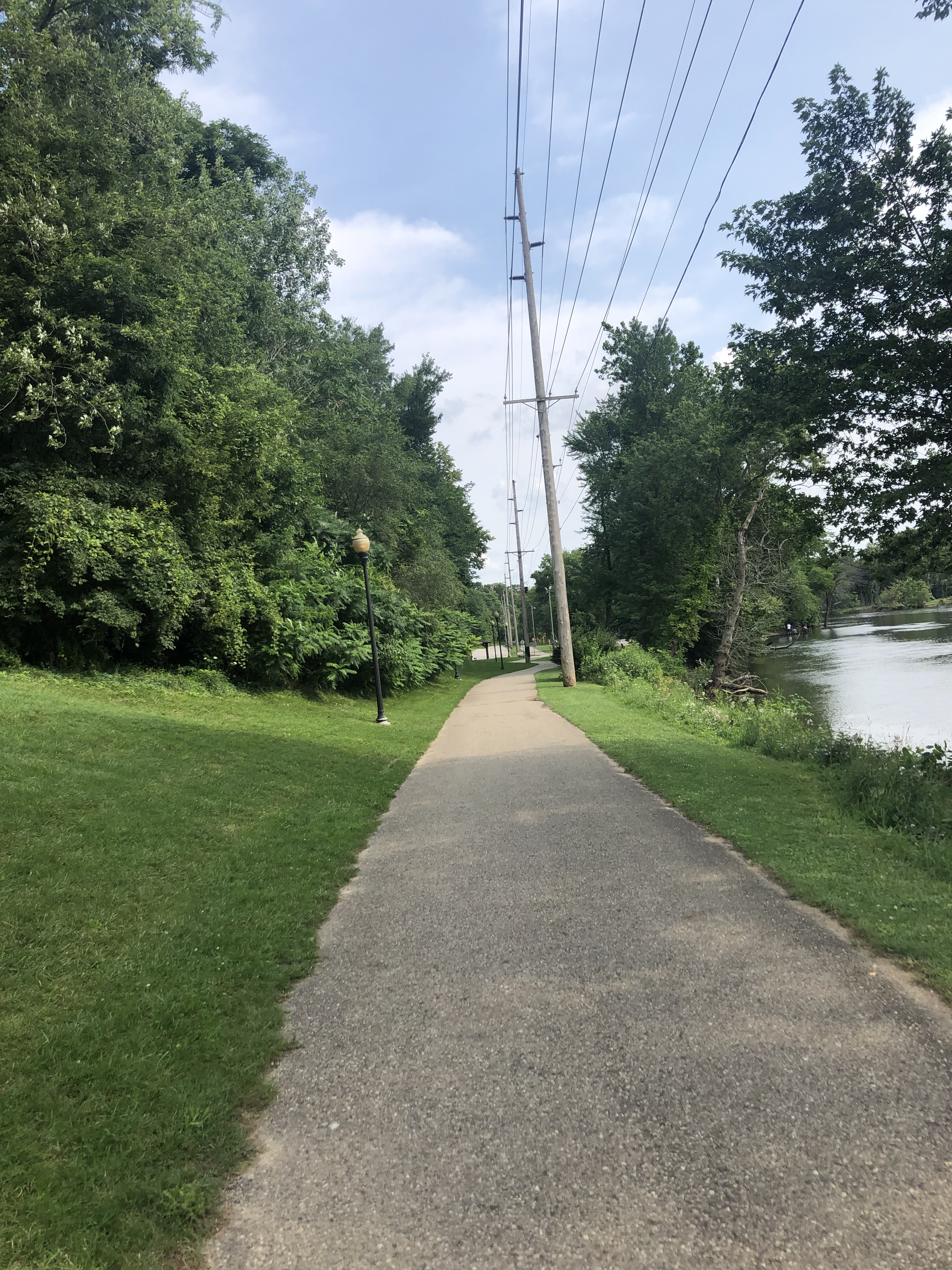
The Indiana-Michigan River Valley Trail, looking southbound, as it runs through Niles. The St. Joseph River can be seen on the right.

Niles includes two other smaller but notable parks. The Saint Joseph River Park, parts of which are now being excavated by archeologists, is south of the French Paper Mill Factory Dam. It includes part of the original Fort St. Joseph. Archaeologists from Western Michigan University have uncovered numerous artifacts at this location. In the summer they host an "Open House" that allows patrons to visit the dig site, see displays of some of the artifacts, and also see demonstrations of historical reenactments. Niles also has a small park, Island Park, that is on an island in the middle of the St. Joseph River. The park has been known to become completely submerged during high flood waters.

In 2003, the City of Niles was awarded a MEDC Community Development Block Grant which, together with private and city funds, allowed for the removal of aluminum fronts from two blocks on Main St. Basic facade restoration along with streetscape improvements were also made, including brick sidewalks and numerous brick flower beds. Jerry Tyler Airport is located at the eastern edge of the city; it is the location of the city's annual Fourth of July celebration.

Near Niles to the northwest is Fernwood Botanical Garden and Nature Preserve. Barron Lake and its adjacent community is to the east. The University of Notre Dame is six miles to the south in South Bend, Indiana.

Niles is located on the northern end of the Indiana-Michigan River Valley Trail, a system of interconnected multi-use trails connecting the cities of Mishawaka, Indiana, South Bend, and Niles. The trail runs through the aforementioned Riverfront Park.

== Infrastructure ==
=== Rail ===
The two passenger rail lines currently serving Niles are Amtrak's Blue Water and Wolverine services. The Blue Water line runs between Chicago and Port Huron, by way of East Lansing and Flint. The Wolverine line runs between Chicago and Pontiac, by way of Jackson, Ann Arbor and Detroit. Freight service provided by the Norfolk Southern Railway. However, it was once served by several other lines. The Amtrak line was the Michigan Central Railroad's main line, opened through Niles in 1848 and 1849. The St. Joseph Valley Railroad opened in 1870 as the Michigan Central's South Bend Branch, and the Michigan Air Line Railroad, leased to the Michigan Central, opened a line heading east from Niles in 1871, known as the Air Line Branch. The final line through Niles was the southeast–northwest Benton Harbor Branch of the Cleveland, Cincinnati, Chicago and St. Louis Railway (also known as the Big Four), originally opened by the Elkhart, Niles and Lake Michigan Railroad in 1881. All of these lines were part of the New York Central Railroad system. The Air Line Branch was abandoned at Niles in 1937, and the Benton Harbor Branch (Big Four) was removed north of Niles in 1980. The South Bend Branch was removed later that decade.

The Amtrak station is located along the main line east of the former Benton Harbor Branch crossing and west of the former junctions with the South Bend and Air Line Branches. Amtrak uses the old Michigan Central station; the current structure was built in 1892 and is listed on the National Register of Historic Places. Scenes in films such as Continental Divide, Midnight Run and Only the Lonely were shot here. Baggage cannot be checked at this location; however, up to two suitcases in addition to any "personal items" such as briefcases, purses, laptop bags, and infant equipment are allowed on board as carry-ons.

=== Major highways ===
- US 12 passes just to the south
- US 31 passes to the west
- M-51
- M-60
- Bus. M-60
- M-139
- M-140

=== Transit ===
Niles is served by Niles Dial-A-Ride Transportation System (DART). The service has been running since 1974. It is run by Niles City Council and operated under contract by McDonald Transit. The agency is based in the same building as the city's Amtrak station. In addition to Dial-a-Ride service, it offers fixed route service via Route 2. The route runs through Niles throughout the weekdays. As of January 1, 2011, it also stops at South Bend, Indiana once every two hours. The route connects to South Bend TRANSPO Route 5 at Auten Road/Route 933 intersection.

== Education ==
The Niles Community Schools consist of four elementary buildings: Northside (grades pre-K and K), Howard-Ellis (grades K-5), Ballard (grades K-5), and Eastside Connections School (grades K-8). The Niles District also has two middle schools: Ring Lardner (grades 6–8) and Eastside Connections School (grades 6–8). Niles High School (grades 9–12) and Niles New Tech Entrepreneurial Academy (grade 9) share students. In addition, the school district has Cedar Lane (alternative education), Southside (special education), and Westside (adult education and administration). The Brandywine School District serves Niles Township and portions of Bertrand, and Milton Townships. Its name is derived from the Brandywine Creek which is a tributary to the St. Joseph River. The schools consist of Merritt Elementary (grades pre-k - 2), Brandywine Elementary (grades 3–6), and Brandywine Middle/High School (grades 7–12). The school district also hosts the Brandywine Innovation Academy, an alternative education center.

== Media ==
The newspaper for the town is the Niles Daily Star. Niles is served by South Bend, Indiana, television and radio.

== Notable people ==
- Joanna Beasley (born 1986) — musician
- Fred Bonine (1863–1941) — eye doctor
- Jake Cinninger (born 1975) — musician, Umphrey's McGee
- Greydon Clark (born 1943) — film director
- John Francis Dodge (1864–1920) — automobile industry pioneer
- Horace Elgin Dodge (1868–1920) — automobile industry pioneer
- Edward L. Hamilton (1857–1923) — U.S. Representative from 1897 until 1921, chair of the United States House Committee on Territories from 1903 until 1911
- Thomas Fitzgerald (1796–1855) — U.S. Senator and probate judge
- Lottie Wilson Jackson (1854–1914) — painter and advocate for women's suffrage and desegregation
- Tommy James (born 1947) — musician, Tommy James and the Shondells
- Ring Lardner (1885–1933) — satirist, short story writer and sports columnist
- Lillian Luckey (1919–2021) — All-American Girls Professional Baseball League player
- Michael Mabry (born 1955) — graphic designer and illustrator
- Josh Priebe (born 2001) — Miami Dolphins Offensive Lineman
- Dave Schmidt (born 1957) — Major League Baseball pitcher
- Diane Seuss (born 1956) — poet, winner of the Pulitzer Prize
- Aaron Montgomery Ward (1844–1913) — founder, Montgomery Ward
- Michael D. West (born 1953) — founder of Geron, CEO of BioTime
- Nancy DeMoss Wolgemuth (born 1858) — American Bible teacher and Radio host
