= Michael D. West =

American biogerontologist

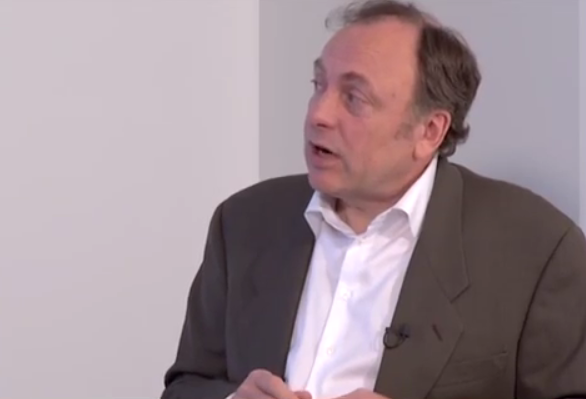
- West in 2013
- Born: April 28, 1953 (age 73); Niles, Michigan, USA
- Citizenship: United States
- Education: Rensselaer Polytechnic Institute (B.S.); Andrews University (M.S.); Baylor College of Medicine (Ph.D.)
- Known for: Founder and CEO of AgeX Therapeutics, former CEO and co-CEO of BioTime, Founder of Geron Corporation, former CEO of Advanced Cell Technology, research in biogerontology, stem cell science, cellular aging, and telomeres

Michael D. West (born 28 April 1953 in Niles, Michigan) is an American biogerontologist. His research focuses, on stem cells, cellular aging and telomerase. He is the CEO of AgeX Therapeutics.

== Early life and education ==
West was born in Niles, Michigan. He graduated from Niles Senior High School and received a BS in psychology from the Rensselaer Polytechnic Institute in 1976. He then received a PhD in cell biology in 1989 from the Baylor College of Medicine. He did postdoctoral research at the University of Texas Southwestern Medical Center at Dallas.

== Career ==
West was founder, director, and chief scientific officer of Geron, for which he secured venture capital investment from Kleiner Perkins Caufield & Byers, Venrock and Domain Associates. At Geron, West initiated and managed programs in telomere biology relating to aging, cancer and human embryonic stem cell technology.

West was chairman of the board, chief scientific officer and CEO of Advanced Cell Technology (ACT), another biotechnology company focused on stem cell research. ACT later changed its name to Ocata Therapeutics, and was acquired by Japanese pharmaceutical company Astellas Pharma in February 2016.

West was a CEO of BioTime, Inc. (NYSE: BTX), later renamed Lineage Cell Therapeutics (NYSE: LCTX). With them, he acquired the stem cell assets of Geron Corporation in a subsidiary of BioTime called Asterias Therapeutics (NYSE: AST), which was later merged with Lineage Cell Therapeutics. While at BioTime, he also founded and took public Oncocyte (NYSE: OCX), which was later renamed Insight Molecular Diagnostics, Inc. (NYSE: IMDX).

West was CEO and founder of AgeX Therapeutics, acquired by Serina Therapeutics in 2024.

West organized the first collaborative effort to isolate human pluripotent (embryonic) stem cells for the purpose of manufacturing products in regenerative medicine in collaboration with James Thomson at the University of Wisconsin at Madison, John Gearhart at Johns Hopkins School of Medicine, and Roger Pedersen at the University of California, San Francisco.

In their telomerase research, West and colleagues at Geron cloned the RNA component of telomerase and collaborated with Thomas Cech (winner of 1989 Nobel Prize in Chemistry), with whom they cloned the catalytic component of the enzyme telomerase, and sponsored collaborative research in the laboratory of Carol Greider, then at Cold Spring Harbor Laboratory. Geron published evidence of the role of telomerase in cancer and cell immortalization in collaboration with Woodring Wright and Jerry Shay at the University of Texas Southwestern Medical Center at Dallas.

For the company's Scientific and Clinical Advisory Board, he recruited Günter Blobel (winner of the 1999 Nobel Prize in Physiology), Leonard Hayflick, Carol Greider (winner of the 2009 Nobel Prize in Medicine), James Watson (winner of the 1962 Nobel Prize in medicine), and others.

West has been a keynote speaker at events including World Stem Cell and is associated with 146 patents in the United States, Australia, Japan, and elsewhere.

West is a member of the Alcor Life Extension Foundation's scientific advisory board. He is a signatory of the Scientists’ Open Letter on Cryonics.

== Bibliography ==
=== Books ===
West has authored and co-edited books on topics including animal cloning, aging, biogerontology, stem cells, stem cell biology, and regenerative medicine.

- 2002 Principles of Cloning ISBN 0-12-174597-X
- 2003 The Immortal Cell, by Michael D. West, Doubleday ISBN 978-0-385-50928-2
- 2004 Handbook of Stem Cells: Volume 1 Embryonic Stem Cells ISBN 0-12-436642-2
- 2004 Handbook of Stem Cells: Volume 2 Adult and Fetal Stem Cells ISBN 0-12-436644-9
- 2006 Essentials of Stem Cell Biology ISBN 0-12-088442-9
- 2010 The Future of Aging ISBN 9048139988
- 2010 The Future of Aging: Pathways to Human Life Extension ISBN 978-90-481-3998-9

== See also ==
- Tissue engineering
- Somatic cell nuclear transfer
