= Maia Biotechnology =

Biotechnology company in Chicago, Illinois

MAIA Biotechnology, Inc.
- Type: Public
- Traded as: NYSE: MAIA
- Industry: Biotechnology, medicine
- Key people: Vlad Vitoc (CEO, chairman), Sergei M. Gryaznov (Chief Scientific Officer)
- Website: maiabiotech.com

MAIA Biotechnology, Inc. is a public, immune-oncology company based in Chicago, IL focused on the development of telomere targeting agents for the treatment of telomerase-positive cancer cells.

== History ==
In August 2022, the company's initial funding round closed, raising $10M.

In March 2024, the company's equity fell below $500,000. In April 2024, the company announced the completion of a $1 million private placement.

== Clinical trials ==
=== THIO-101 ===
A phase II THIO-101 clinical trial of THIO sequenced with cemiplimab to treat advanced non-small cell lung cancer (NSCLC) continued in 2024. The trial is a multicentre, open-label, dose-finding trial designed to assess anti-tumour activity followed by PD-L1 inhibition. The study population was patients with advanced NSCLC who did not respond or developed resistance to first-line treatments using another checkpoint inhibitor. The trial's primary objectives are to assess tolerability, safety, and clinical efficacy using overall response rate (ORR) as the primary endpoint.

In 2025, the FDA "Rare Pediatric Disease Designation" for THIO in treating pediatric-type diffuse high-grade gliomas (PDHGG), making MAIA eligible for a priority review voucher upon future FDA approval.

=== Drug candidates ===
THIO (6-thio-2'-deoxyguanosine) is a drug that attempts to kill cells that express telomerase, which is found in 85% of human cancers.

== See also ==
- Geron Corporation
- Imetelstat
