= Patiently Waiting =

Patiently Waiting may refer to:

- Patiently Waiting, album by Joanna Beasley 2009
- Patiently Waiting, album by Social Code 2001
- "Patiently Waiting", song by singer Kathy Mattea, written by Gillian Welch, from Love Travels
- "Patiently Waiting", song by Mac Dre, Chop Da Hookman, Young Los & Mistah F.A.B. from Dre Area
- "Patiently Waiting", song by 50 Cent from Get Rich or Die Tryin'
