= Geron Corporation =

American biotechnology company

- Type: Public
- Traded as: Nasdaq: GERN; Russell 2000 Component
- Industry: Biotechnology
- Founded: 1990
- Headquarters: Foster City, California, U.S.
- Key people: Harout Semerjian (CEO); Michelle Roberston (CFO)
- Products: Cancer drugs (currently in human trials)
- Revenue: ▲USD1.39 million (2021)
- Net income: ▼USD116 million (2021)
- Total assets: ▼USD226 million (2021)
- Total equity: ▼USD126 million (2021)
- Number of employees: 82
- Website: www.geron.com

Geron Corporation is a biotechnology company located in Foster City, California which specializes in developing and commercializing therapeutic products for cancer that inhibit telomerase.

== Company information ==
Geron, based in Foster City, California, was founded by gerontologist Mary C. West and Michael D. West, now CEO of AgeX Therapeutics. They secured initial venture capital investments in the company from Kleiner Perkins Caufield & Byers and Venrock. The company was incorporated in 1990 and began doing business in 1992. John A. Scarlett was appointed CEO in 2011.

The company's Scientific and Clinical Advisory Board has included Nobel laureates James Watson, Gunter Blobel, and Carol Greider, and Leonard Hayflick, known for discovering that human cells divide for a limited number of times in vitro (called the Hayflick limit).

In 2017, Geron staff received the highest median pay in California, at $500,250.

== Drug candidates ==
=== Cancer therapies ===
Geron Corporation has sponsored human clinical trials of several potential anti-cancer products.

- Imetelstat (GRN163L) is a drug that targets telomerase. In studies conducted at Johns Hopkins University, GRN163L was active against both CD138+ and CD138neg cancer stem cells and eliminated the colony forming potential of both by five weeks. Similarly, GRN163L inhibited the in vitro clonogenic growth of CD138neg Multiple Myeloma Cancer Stem Cells isolated from the bone marrow aspirates of patients with multiple myeloma. On November 3, 2014, the FDA removed the full clinical hold on imetelstat and declared the company's clinical development plan as acceptable. In 2014, Geron licensed imetelstat to Janssen Biotech. In 2017, imetelstat was granted fast track status by the FDA for certain patients with myelodysplastic syndrome. In 2018, Janssen Biotech returned the rights to imetelstat to Geron. Imetelstat is currently in two Phase 3 trials: NCT02598661, a study of the drug's ability to reduce the transfusion requirements of patients with myelodysplastic syndrome (MDS), and NCT04576156, an investigation of the drug's effect on the overall survival of patients with myelofibrosis.
- A trial of GRNVAC1, a telomerase vaccine being used on patients with prostate cancer was carried out at Duke University. Geron's progress with telomerase vaccines attracted a modest monetary investment in 2005 from Merck.
- GRN1005, an LRP-directed conjugate of paclitaxel, was in phase II clinical trials for brain cancer but discontinued based on preliminary results in 2012.

=== Telomerase activation ===
In addition to testing drug candidates that exploit cancer cell's dependence on telomerase, Geron is researching the possible applications of activating the enzyme in normal cells to delay cellular senescence. The company is in the early stages of developing a telomerase based treatment for HIV called TAT0002, which is the saponin cycloastragenol in Chinese herb Astragalus propinquus. Geron has granted a license to Telomerase Activation Sciences to sell TA-65, the telomerase activator agent also derived from astragalus. In October 2010 Intertek/AAC Labs, an ISO 17025 internationally recognized lab, found the largest component of TA-65 to be cycloastragenol.

Geron originally investigated telomerase as a means of understanding and modifying human aging. However, Geron has ceased aging research of any kind.

=== Stem cell therapies ===
On January 23, 2009, Geron received FDA approval to begin Phase I testing of GRNOPC1 in humans. GRNOPC1 is an embryonic stem cell based drug that is designed to treat specific forms of spinal cord injury through remyelination of damaged axons. This trial does not involve direct use of stem cells however, as GRNOPC1 is composed of oligodendrocyte progenitor cells derived from embryonic stem cell lines. Studies have shown significant restoration of mobility in animals with spinal injuries that received cells.

Geron also has several other embryonic stem cell treatments that are still in the preclinical phase, including GRNCM1, a treatment for heart disease, and GRNIC1, a treatment for diabetes. In tests with diabetic mice, 80% of the mice given GRNIC1 were still alive in 50 days while the entire control group, which was given no treatment, perished.

Geron sold its human stem cell research assets to Asterias in 2013.

==== GRNOPC1 ====
As of October 2010 and November 2010, one of Geron's most highly publicized trial therapy products has been GRNOPC1, a stem cell therapy designed to heal severe spinal cord injuries. The cells in the GRNOPC1 therapy have been coaxed into becoming early myelinated glial cells, a type of cell that insulates nerve cells. For every GRNOPC1 cell that is injected in the patient, they become six to ten cells in a few months. In October 2011 updated results on four patients were released. The trial was discontinued in Nov 2011.

In early 2013 BioTime, whose CEO at the time was Geron founder Michael D. West, acquired 400 patents and other intellectual property related to embryonic stem cells from Geron and later went on to restart the trial.

== Patent issues ==
Geron Corporation initially held exclusive rights to three cell types derived from embryonic stem cells, as the result of paying for the research originally conducted by Dr. James Thomson at the University of Wisconsin–Madison. The patents on the other three cell types are owned by the Wisconsin Alumni Research Foundation (WARF). WARF and Geron did not charge academics to study human stem cells but did charge commercial users. In 2001 WARF came under public pressure to widen access to human stem-cell technology, and they launched legal action against Geron Corporation to recover some of the previously sold rights. The two sides agreed that Geron would keep the rights to only three cell types.

In October 2006, a legal challenge was mounted to overturn these patents by The Foundation for Taxpayer and Consumer Rights and the non-profit patent-watchdog Public Patent Foundation. They contended that two of the patents granted to WARF are invalid because they cover a technique published in 1992 for which a patent had already been granted to an Australian researcher. Another part of the challenge came from the molecular biologist Jeanne Loring who stated that University of Wisconsin–Madison stem cell pioneer James Thomson's techniques (currently patents held by WARF) are rendered obvious by a 1990 paper and two textbooks. The outcome of this legal challenge was particularly relevant to the Geron Corporation as it can only license patents that are upheld. The patents were ultimately upheld when the reexamination concluded in 2008.

As an interim measure, on January 23, 2007, WARF relaxed the stem cell patents, allowing industry-sponsored research at academic and non-profit institutions without a license. WARF will allow easier and simpler cost free cell transfers among researchers and would not require a license or agreement from California's taxpayer-funded stem cell research program.

== Politics ==
As a participant in the then-controversial stem cell and cloning area, Geron Corporation was asked to testify about its technology before the U.S. Congress. In 2001, when Congress was attempting to ban all forms of cloning, then Geron CEO Thomas Okarma spoke before Congress to preserve cloning for therapeutic purposes.

== See also ==
- Maia Biotechnology
