= Lottie Wilson Jackson =

African-American suffragist (c.1854–1914)

Charlotte "Lottie" Wilson Jackson
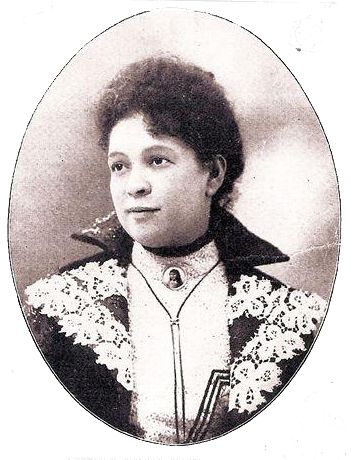
- Born: Charlotte Wilson c. 1854; Niles, Michigan, US
- Died: January 16, 1914 (aged 59–60); Niles, Michigan, US
- Other name: Lottie Wilson
- Education: School of the Art Institute of Chicago
- Known for: Painting

Charlotte Wilson Jackson (c. 1854 – January 16, 1914) was an American artist and activist from Michigan. She was the first African American to attend the School of the Art Institute of Chicago. In 1901, Wilson oversaw the exhibition of African-American artists at the Pan-American Exposition.

She signed her name as "Lottie Wilson" on her paintings and sculpture.

== Biography ==
Lottie Wilson was born in about 1854 in Niles, Michigan. As an adult, she was a resident of Bay City, Michigan, and had an art studio there that was open to the public. In 1901, Wilson moved to Washington, D.C. to open an art studio where she held art exhibits and taught classes until 1905. She was married three times; first at the age of 18 to James Huggart, then to John Jackson, and then in 1906 to Daniel Moss. She had three children with her first husband, none of them surviving childhood.

== Art and activism ==
Wilson was an oil painter, sculptor, and provider of gallery space. Her large oil painting "President Lincoln with a Former Slave", 1902, depicts Abraham Lincoln with women's rights activist Sojourner Truth. President Theodore Roosevelt accepted the painting into the White House's permanent art collection. Wilson was the first African-American artist whose work became a part of the White House collection. She painted a portrait of Booker T. Washington for the Tuskegee Institute and a portrait of Charles Sumner for the Provident Hospital in Chicago in 1892.

Wilson was a women's rights activist. She spoke about women's progress at churches and art studios throughout the late 1800s. She addressed the first annual convention of the League of Colored Women in Washington D.C. (1896) and the Michigan Equal Suffrage Association convention (1898). In 1899, Lottie served as the Bay City, Michigan representative at the National Women's Suffrage Association Convention in Dunkirk, New York. In 1897, she helped establish the Phillis Wheatley Home in Detroit, a chapter of the national African‐American women's club that provided lodging, educational and recreational programs, and a forum for discussing political issues. She was a member of the Afro-American Council (AAC), the National Association of Colored Women (NACW), and the National American Woman Suffrage Association (NAWSA).

Wilson was a race desegregation activist, specifically petitioning at a 1899 NAWSA meeting to desegregate train travel for black women. She argued: "Colored women ought not to be compelled to ride in smoking cars, and that suitable accommodations should be provided for them." Her resolution ultimately was tabled in response to objections from white southern suffragists.

Wilson died on January 16, 1914, in Niles.

Wilson was inducted into the Michigan Women's Hall of Fame in 2016.

== See also ==
- List of suffragists and suffragettes
