= Nathaniel C. Comfort =

American historian (born 1962)

Nathaniel Charles Comfort
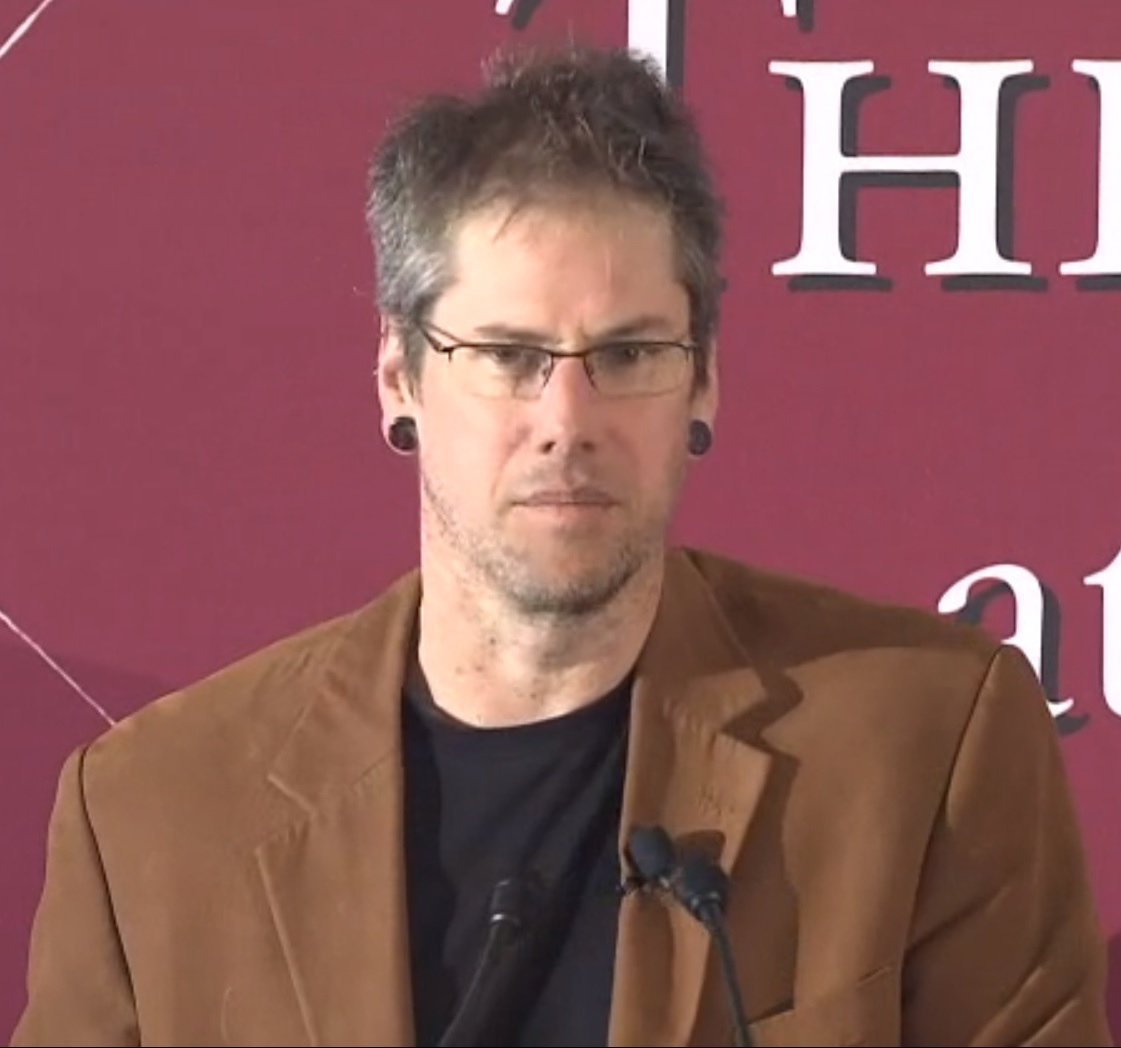
- Comfort in 2016
- Born: 1962 (age 63–64)
- Education: UC Berkeley (BA); Cornell University (MS); SUNY at Stony Brook (PhD)
- Occupations: Researcher, professor, writer

Nathaniel Charles Comfort (born 1962) is an American historian who specializes in the history of biology and medicine. He is a professor in the Department of the History of Medicine at Johns Hopkins University, which he joined in 2003. In 2015, he was appointed the third Baruch S. Blumberg NASA/Library of Congress Chair in Astrobiology at the Library of Congress John W. Kluge Center. He also serves on the advisory council of METI.

Comfort is best known for his 2001 biography of the geneticist Barbara McClintock, The Tangled Field, and for The Science of Human Perfection (2012), a history of human and medical genetics in the United States. He has written widely on genetics, eugenics and gene editing, and with Matthew Cobb published a 2023 reassessment in Nature of Rosalind Franklin's role in the discovery of the structure of DNA. He is writing a biography of the molecular biologist James Watson.

== Education ==
Comfort received a B.A. in marine biology from the University of California, Berkeley in 1985, and an M.S. in neurobiology and behavior from Cornell University in 1990. After working as a science writer at Cold Spring Harbor Laboratory, he completed his Ph.D. in history at Stony Brook University in 1997.

== Career ==
From 1997 to 2002, Comfort was an assistant and later associate professor of history at George Washington University, where he was also deputy director of the Center for History of Recent Science. He joined Johns Hopkins University in 2003 and became a full professor in 2014, holding a joint appointment in the Department of the History of Science and Technology. During 2024–25 he was a visiting professor at the University of California, Berkeley.

Comfort is a member of the History of Science Society and the International Society for the History, Philosophy, and Social Studies of Biology, and has served on the editorial board of History and Philosophy of the Life Sciences. His writing on genetics, eugenics and the history of medicine has appeared in publications including The New York Times, The Atlantic, Nautilus and The Nation. He was among the authors invited to contribute to Nature's 150th-anniversary issue in 2019.

== Research and writing ==
Comfort's first book, The Tangled Field: Barbara McClintock's Search for the Patterns of Genetic Control (2001), reassessed the scientific reception of McClintock's work on transposable genetic elements; reviewers praised its reinterpretation of the long-standing view that her findings had been neglected. His 2012 book The Science of Human Perfection examines the history of human and medical genetics in the United States and its links to the eugenics movement, a theme he has also developed in essays on modern gene editing.

In April 2023, marking the seventieth anniversary of the discovery of the double-helix structure of DNA, Comfort and the zoologist Matthew Cobb published a comment article in Nature reassessing Rosalind Franklin's contribution. Drawing on a 1953 letter and an unpublished draft news article, they argued that Franklin had been an equal member of the group that solved the structure, rather than a victim whose data was taken without her knowledge.

Comfort has spent more than a decade researching a biography of James Watson, under contract with Basic Books. Following Watson's death in November 2025, he was widely quoted in coverage of Watson's life and legacy.

== Personal life ==
Comfort married the molecular biologist Carol W. Greider in 1993; they have two children.

== Publications ==
- Comfort, Nathaniel C. (2001). The Tangled Field: Barbara McClintock's Search for the Patterns of Genetic Control. Cambridge, Mass.: Harvard University Press. ISBN 9780674004566.
- Comfort, Nathaniel (2007). Comfort, Nathaniel (ed.). The Panda's Black Box: Opening Up the Intelligent Design Controversy. Baltimore: Johns Hopkins University Press. ISBN 9780801885990.
- Comfort, Nathaniel (2012). The Science of Human Perfection: How Genes Became the Heart of American Medicine. New Haven: Yale University Press. ISBN 9780300169911.
