= Fred Bonine =

American sprinter and eye doctor (1863–1941)

- Born: October 21, 1863; Niles, Michigan, U.S.
- Died: August 22, 1941 (aged 77); Niles, Michigan, U.S.
- Education: University of Michigan
- Known for: Claiming to have held world's record in 110-yard dash from 1886 to 1921

Frederick N. Bonine (October 21, 1863 – August 22, 1941) was an American sprinter and eye doctor.

== Early years and athlete ==
Bonine was born in Niles, Michigan, in 1863. His father, Evan J. Bonine, a physician with a practice in Niles, had been a civil war surgeon; a diary in the Niles museum recounts his travel south by stagecoach and his history of performing many amputations. Fred attended the Niles public schools, then enrolled at the University of Michigan where he received his medical degree. He received advanced training in ear eye nose surgery in Frieberg, Germany.

An article about Bonine published in 1925 and distributed by the Associated Press (AP) claimed that he was a member of Michigan's football and track teams. It also claimed that in 1886, Bonine set a world's record with a time of 10.8 seconds in the 110-yard dash, which would have been an unofficial record for 35 years until it was broken in 1921 by Charley Paddock. Timekeeping was questioned by track followers at the time, and Bonine was handily beaten in a race with Harvard's Wendell Baker, who was also considered the record holder at 11.2 seconds until 1910. The aforementioned 1925 AP article also claimed that in 1886, Bonine was the captain of the Michigan track team that became the first athletic team from the west to compete in New York. A Philadelphia Times report on leading collegiate athletes between 1885 and 1895 reported Bonine held the fastest collegiate time for the 100-yard dash in 1885 with a time of 10.6 seconds.

== Medical practice ==
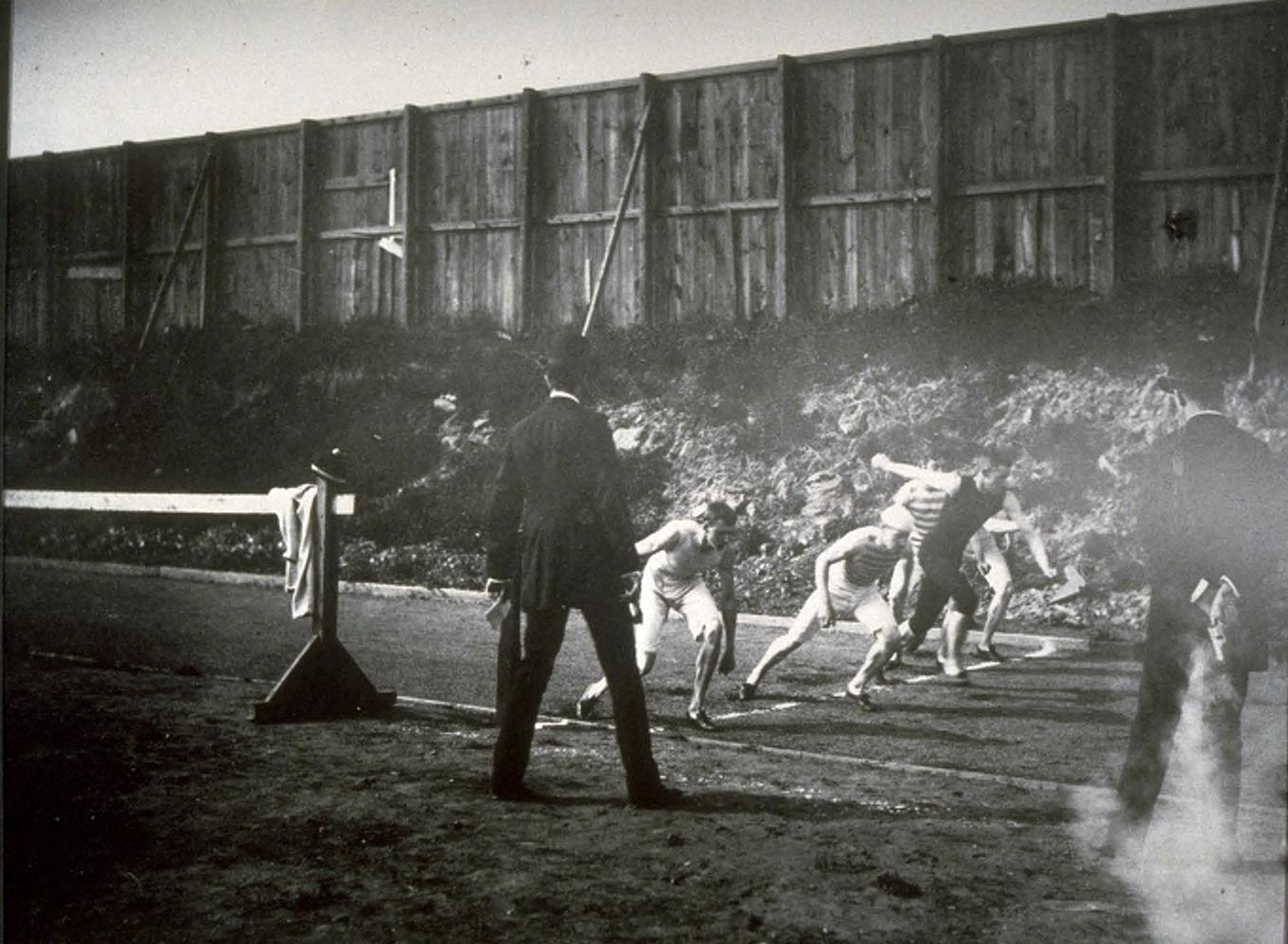
Bonine at 1885 Intercollegiate Championships.

Bonine later became an eye doctor. According to Bonine, each year, tens of thousands of patients from around the world reportedly sought treatment at Bonine's office above a corner drug store in Niles. Bonine's obituary reported that he reputedly treated as many as 517 patients in one day and saw 200 patients in a day. Hundreds were said to have lined up each day, none with appointments, to see him, with each being charged the same fee of two dollars for a first visit and one dollar for subsequent visits. A 1925 AP article claimed that special buses from Chicago to Niles ran twice a week to bring patients to see Bonine. Several restaurants, gift shops, and hotels in Niles reportedly "owed their existence to the patronage drawn to this small city by his fame." One newspaper wrote:

"So numerous were the patients who filled his office each day, that brutally long hours were required to care for them. He never spared himself, frequently remaining until 10 o'clock or even midnight to finish. An indefatigable worker, he had the assistance of only a small office force. One of his main therapies was a treatment nonsurgically for dissolving cataracts with a proprietary solution. It was said of him that he rivalled Napoleon Bonaparte and Thomas A. Edison for going without sleep. . . . A time-worn, old-fashioned suite of office in Niles was a crossroads for that vast army of unfortunates with afflicted eyesight who came from the four corners of the earth seeking the professional assistance of Dr. Fred N. Bonine."

According to an obituary, Bonine estimated that he had seen 1,500,000 patients in nearly 40 years of practice. This figure is completely impossible, though, suggesting a misquote, a math error, a wild exaggeration, or the like.

== Sports medicine and boxing commissioner ==
In 1912, he served as a medical advisor to the United States team at the 1912 Summer Olympics in Stockholm, Sweden. Bonine was also a member of the Michigan State Athletic Board of Control and the Michigan Boxing Commission. He became a close friend of heavyweight boxing champion Jack Dempsey after reportedly saving Dempsey's eyesight at the height of the boxer's career. In 1925, at Bonine's office in Dempsey and African-American champion Harry Wills signed papers agreeing to fight for the heavyweight championship of the world. The fight never took place.

== Community service and later years ==
Bonine also served nine years as the mayor of Niles. He was married to Viva Thomas and a member of the Trinity Episcopal Church in Niles. He was a 33rd degree Mason and was honored at a Masonic dinner in November 1934 on the occasion of his 50th year in the Masons.

Bonine became ill with pneumonia in the spring of 1938. He suffered a stroke in June 1938 from which he recovered in part, but he was unable to return to his medical practice. Bonine died at his home in Niles in August 1941 at age 77. Stores and factories in his home town closed for his funeral, which was held at the Trinity Episcopal Church.

== 2022 reassessment ==
In 2022, skepticism was raised about much of the information in the contemporary news accounts by Paul Campos, calling the claims of treating over a million patients and being an Olympic-class runner implausible and unlikely. Rather, according to Campos, it is more likely that in the course of promotion of the possible Dempsey-Wills boxing match, journalists talking to Bonine, one of the organizers, repeated or exaggerated wild claims. Campos based much of his claims on research of records at the Bentley Historical Library of the University of Michigan. Campos did not find Bonine listed in the all-time rosters of the Michigan Wolverines football team, suggesting that the claim of him being a member is doubtful. The University of Michigan did not even have a track-and-field team until 1898 at the earliest, casting doubt on the contemporary claims of him having captained such a team in the 1880s as well. The claimed time at the 110-yard dash was so fast that if taken seriously, Bonine was the fastest human in the world for decades, which Campos thought would have surely come up in the University of Michigan records if really true. Yet, the claimed 110-yard dash record was nowhere to be found there. Campos did find a record of Bonine completing the 100 yard dash in a time of 10.6 seconds at an IC4A event, making him the University of Michigan's first individual national champion in any sport; an impressive feat, but not the same as a world-class record setter. For Bonine's claims of being an ophthalmologist so popular special buses were chartered, Campos found them entirely implausible. To see as many patients as claimed would require spending less than five minutes per patient while working continuously with no vacations nor breaks and never seeing any repeat patients, and also implied that Bonine should have been very wealthy. More generally, transit at the dawn of the 20th century was sufficiently slow and expensive that the idea of hordes of people traveling for hours to come to Niles, Michigan, for a short check-up was not credible.
