= Joanna Beasley =

American singer

- Born: Joanna Gloria Martino; April 16, 1986 (age 40); Niles, Michigan
- Origin: Brentwood, Tennessee
- Genres: Worship, CCM, pop rock
- Occupations: Singer, songwriter
- Instruments: Vocals, singer-songwriter
- Years active: 2003–present
- Website: joannabeasley.com

Joanna Gloria Beasley (née, Martino; born April 16, 1986) is an American Christian pop musician and worship recording artist. She started her music career in 2003, by auditioning and getting a pass on American Idol during season two. She has released three studio albums: My World in 2005, Patiently Waiting in 2009, and Loud Love in 2013, and an extended play, Hallelujah Christmas, in 2013.

== Early life and background ==
Beasley was born Joanna Gloria Martino, on April 16, 1986, in Niles, Michigan, as the daughter of Emilio and Sherry Martino, who graduated from Edwardsburg High School. She auditioned and got a pass on season two of American Idol, in 2003, at the Detroit auditions.

== Music career ==
Her music recording career started in 2005, with the studio album, My World, that was released on August 23, 2005, independently. Her second studio album, Patiently Waiting, was independently released on November 7, 2009. She released Loud Love, on April 16, 2013, independently. The extended play, Hallelujah Christmas, was released independently on December 1, 2013.

== Personal life ==
She married Kerry Ray Beasley of Elkhart, Indiana, in a September 13, 2008 ceremony, at Silver Beach located in St. Joseph, Michigan. The couple now reside in Brentwood, Tennessee.

== Discography ==
Studio albums

- My World (August 23, 2005)
- Patiently Waiting (November 7, 2009)
- Loud Love (April 16, 2013)

EPs

- Hallelujah Christmas (December 1, 2013)
