= Paclitaxel trevatide =

Chemical compound

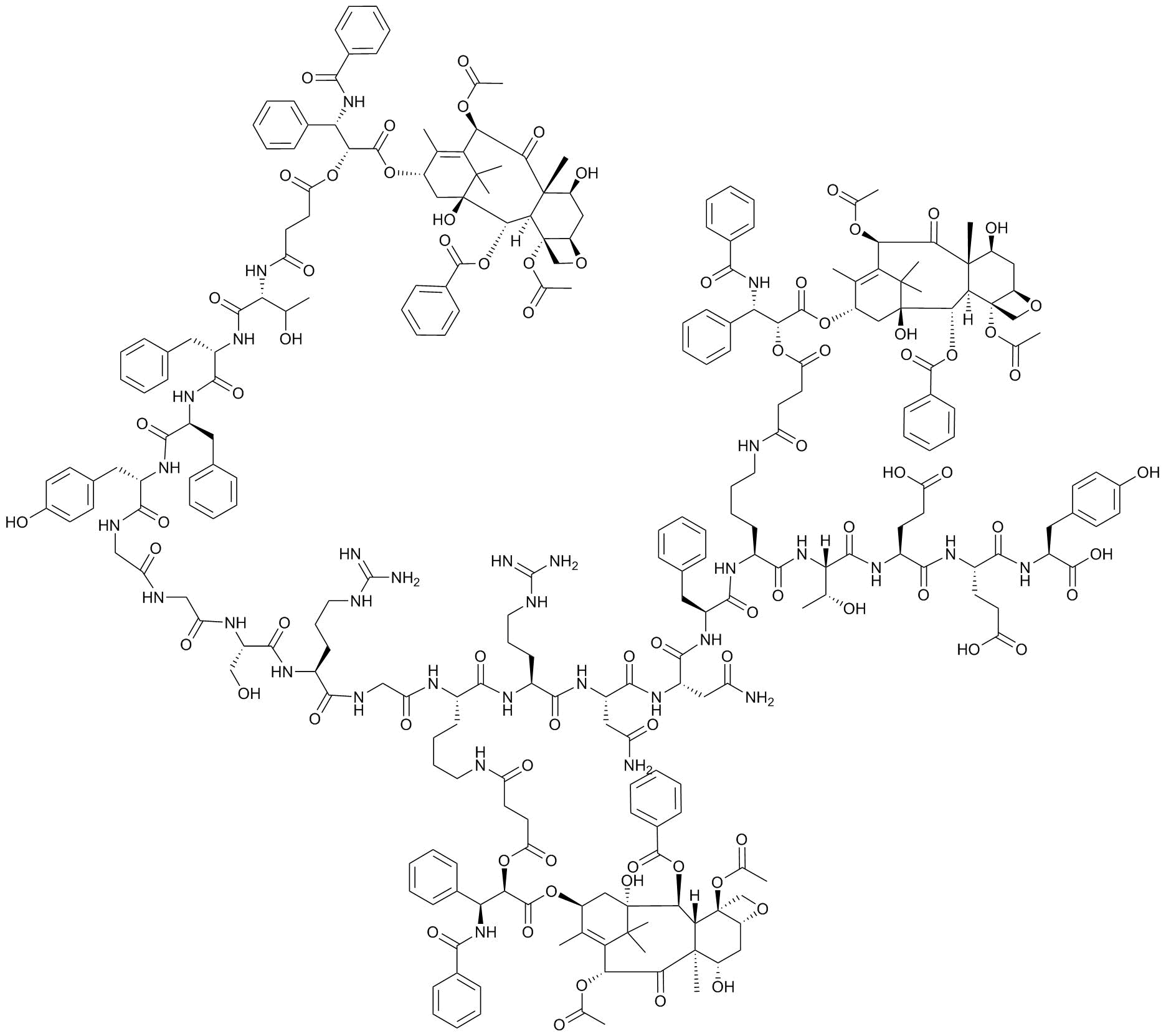

Clinical data
- Other names: NG1005; GRN1005

Legal status
- Legal status: Investigational

Identifiers
- CAS Number: 1075214-55-9
- DrugBank: DB06171
- ChemSpider: 35003422
- UNII: 8P77G99D3P

Chemical and physical data
- Formula: C_{257}H_{308}N_{32}O_{79}
- Molar mass: 5109.436 g·mol^{−1}
- 3D model (JSmol): Interactive image
- SMILES: CC1=C2[C@@H](C(=O)[C@]3([C@@H](C[C@H]4[C@@]([C@@H]3[C@H]([C@](C2(C)C)(C[C@H]1OC(=O)[C@H]([C@@H](c5ccccc5)NC(=O)c6ccccc6)OC(=O)CCC(=O)NCCCC[C@H](C(=O)N[C@H](CCCNC(=N)N)C(=O)N[C@H](CC(=O)N)C(=O)N[C@H](CC(=O)N)C(=O)N[C@H](Cc7ccccc7)C(=O)N[C@H](CCCCNC(=O)CCC(=O)O[C@@H]([C@@H](c8ccccc8)NC(=O)c9ccccc9)C(=O)O[C@@H]1C[C@@]2([C@@H]([C@@H]3[C@]([C@@H](C[C@H]5[C@@]3(CO5)OC(=O)C)O)(C(=O)[C@H](C(=C1C)C2(C)C)OC(=O)C)C)OC(=O)c1ccccc1)O)C(=O)N[C@H]([C@H](C)O)C(=O)N[C@H](CCC(=O)O)C(=O)N[C@H](CCC(=O)O)C(=O)N[C@H](Cc1ccc(cc1)O)C(=O)O)NC(=O)CNC(=O)[C@@H](CCCNC(=N)N)NC(=O)[C@@H](CO)NC(=O)CNC(=O)CNC(=O)[C@@H](Cc1ccc(cc1)O)NC(=O)[C@@H](Cc1ccccc1)NC(=O)[C@@H](Cc1ccccc1)NC(=O)[C@H]([C@@H](C)O)NC(=O)CCC(=O)O[C@H]([C@H](c1ccccc1)NC(=O)c1ccccc1)C(=O)O[C@H]1C[C@]2([C@H]([C@H]3[C@@]([C@H](C[C@@H]5[C@]3(CO5)OC(=O)C)O)(C(=O)[C@@H](C(=C1C)C2(C)C)OC(=O)C)C)OC(=O)c1ccccc1)O)O)OC(=O)c1ccccc1)(CO4)OC(=O)C)O)C)OC(=O)C
- InChI: InChI=1S/C257H308N32O79/c1-133-174(123-255(348)216(363-238(342)155-81-51-30-52-82-155)210-249(18,177(301)120-180-252(210,130-351-180)366-141(9)296)213(319)204(354-138(6)293)196(133)246(255,12)13)357-241(345)207(201(149-69-39-24-40-70-149)287-219(322)152-75-45-27-46-76-152)360-193(316)106-101-185(306)264-109-59-57-87-161(271-190(311)128-270-222(325)160(89-61-111-266-244(260)261)273-234(337)173(129-290)272-189(310)127-268-188(309)126-269-223(326)166(116-147-91-95-158(299)96-92-147)278-230(333)168(114-145-65-35-22-36-66-145)279-231(334)169(115-146-67-37-23-38-68-146)283-235(338)199(136(4)291)285-187(308)103-108-195(318)362-209(203(151-73-43-26-44-74-151)289-221(324)154-79-49-29-50-80-154)243(347)359-176-125-257(350)218(365-240(344)157-85-55-32-56-86-157)212-251(20,179(303)122-182-254(212,132-353-182)368-143(11)298)215(321)206(356-140(8)295)198(135(176)3)248(257,16)17)224(327)274-163(90-62-112-267-245(262)263)225(328)281-170(118-183(258)304)233(336)282-171(119-184(259)305)232(335)280-167(113-144-63-33-21-34-64-144)229(332)275-162(228(331)286-200(137(5)292)236(339)277-165(100-105-192(314)315)226(329)276-164(99-104-191(312)313)227(330)284-172(237(340)341)117-148-93-97-159(300)98-94-148)88-58-60-110-265-186(307)102-107-194(317)361-208(202(150-71-41-25-42-72-150)288-220(323)153-77-47-28-48-78-153)242(346)358-175-124-256(349)217(364-239(343)156-83-53-31-54-84-156)211-250(19,178(302)121-181-253(211,131-352-181)367-142(10)297)214(320)205(355-139(7)294)197(134(175)2)247(256,14)15/h21-56,63-86,91-98,136-137,160-182,199-212,216-218,290-292,299-303,348-350H,57-62,87-90,99-132H2,1-20H3,(H2,258,304)(H2,259,305)(H,264,306)(H,265,307)(H,268,309)(H,269,326)(H,270,325)(H,271,311)(H,272,310)(H,273,337)(H,274,327)(H,275,332)(H,276,329)(H,277,339)(H,278,333)(H,279,334)(H,280,335)(H,281,328)(H,282,336)(H,283,338)(H,284,330)(H,285,308)(H,286,331)(H,287,322)(H,288,323)(H,289,324)(H,312,313)(H,314,315)(H,340,341)(H4,260,261,266)(H4,262,263,267)/t136-,137+,160-,161-,162-,163-,164-,165-,166-,167-,168-,169-,170-,171-,172-,173-,174-,175-,176+,177-,178-,179+,180+,181+,182-,199+,200-,201-,202-,203+,204+,205+,206-,207+,208+,209-,210-,211-,212+,216-,217-,218+,249+,250+,251-,252-,253-,254+,255+,256+,257-/m1/s1; Key:GBVKRUOMSUTVPW-KARLVTCBSA-N

Paclitaxel trevatide (development codes NG1005 and GRN1005) is an experimental chemotherapy drug that is under development by Angiochem Inc, a Canadian biotech company. Phase II clinical trials have completed for several indications, and the company is preparing for phase III trials.

Paclitaxel trevatide is a paclitaxel-Angiopep-2 conjugate. Various Angiopep vectors have been composed and differ by their anti-cancer moieties. This has then been shown to be a prospective cancer therapy drug that can not only be conjugated to paclitaxel but also peptides, monoclonal antibodies, siRNA and many other biological materials. Paclitaxel trevatide has the potential to treat a variety of CNS diseases including glioma. Research has shown reduction in tumor growth in mice and rats with glioblastoma.

== Mechanism of action ==
This drug was specifically designed to treat brain tumors. Because of the blood brain barrier (BBB), many cancer therapy drugs are prevented from passing through the brain capillaries into the parenchyma. Paclitaxel is generally prevented from reaching its target in the cell due to the presence of the efflux pump P-glycoprotein (P-gp) at the barrier. This is known as a multidrug resistant-associated protein (MRP1) that causes resistance amongst many organic drugs that are not conjugated to acidic ligands. This receptor is an ATP-driven transporter that will pump drugs, drug metabolites, and endogenous metabolites out of the cell.

Paclitaxel trevatide contains paclitaxel, which stabilizes microtubule polymer formation. Microtubules are composed of polymers consisting of the protein tubulin. Therefore, paclitaxel binds at the site of β-tubulin and induces polymerization, thus protecting the microtubule from disassembling during mitosis. This blocks the progression of mitosis due to a prolonged activation of the microtubule in the mitotic checkpoint, resulting in cell apoptosis or reversion to the G0 phase. However, paclitaxel trevatide will effectively transport across the BBB with approximately a 100-fold higher transport rate compared to a free paclitaxel. Paclitaxel trevatide will cross the capillary medium via receptor mediated transcytosis of the low-density lipoprotein receptor-related protein 1 (LRP1) which is upregulated in some cancers. Ester hydrolyzing enzymes (esterases) then catalyze a highly stereospecific reaction that results in hydrolysis of the paclitaxel trevatide ester to carboxylic acids. This results in the intracellular release of paclitaxel and subsequent action on tubulin.

Concentration has been found to play a key role paclitaxel trevatide's administration. Studies show that a high concentration will suppress microtubule detachment which is necessary for mitosis to occur. The microenvironment of cells may also differ from that of rapidly proliferating cancer cells. This is generally more oxygen deficient and acidic. These conditions will then result in a selective pressure towards cancer cell proliferation. It has been shown that cancer cell lines exposed to this hypoxic or serum-deprived condition will upregulate LRP1 expression, thus leading to an increased uptake of paclitaxel trevatide. However, these receptors are also present in non-cancerous cells, thus presenting a challenge due to non-specific targeting. It is then believed that because these receptors are overexposed in tumors, that receptor binding may be in favor of the cancer cells.

== Clinical trials ==
In 2008, two phase I clinical trials of paclitaxel trevatide were started; one in patients with advanced cancer and brain metastases, and another in patients with recurrent malignant glioma. Favorable initial tolerability results in brain cancer were reported in March 2009. and more in October 2009 and updated in June 2010. In 2014, paclitaxel trevatide received orphan drug designation from FDA for the treatment of glioblastoma multiform As of January 2016, Angiochem has conducted phase II trials for the treatment of breast cancer with brain metastasis, glioblastoma, and high-grade glioma.

Results from the phase II trial in patients with breast cancer and leptomeningeal carcinomatosis, a fatal form of brain metastasis, were presented at ASCO in 2016.
