= Imetelstat =

Medication

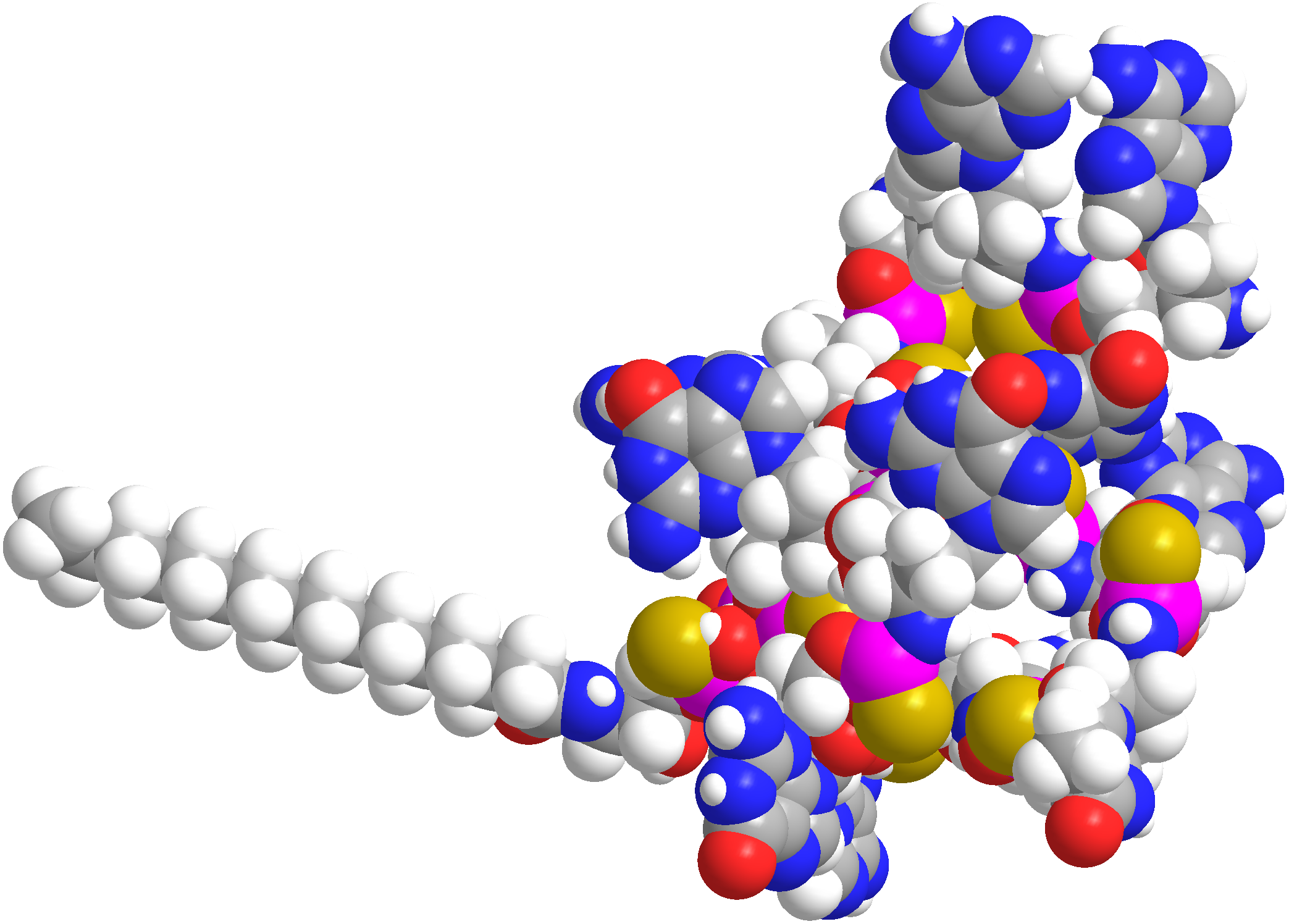

Clinical data
- Trade names: Rytelo
- Other names: GRN163L
- AHFS/Drugs.com: Monograph
- MedlinePlus: a624035
- License data: US DailyMed: Imetelstat
- Routes of administration: Intravenous
- ATC code: L01XX80 (WHO)

Legal status
- Legal status: US: ℞-only; EU: Rx-only

Identifiers
- IUPAC name: N-[2-[[(2S,3S,5R)-3-[[[(2S,3S,5R)-3-[[[(2S,3S,5R)-3-[[[(2S,3S,5R)-3-[[[(2S,3S,5R)-3-[[[(2S,3S,5R)-3-[[[(2S,3S,5R)-3-[[[(2S,3S,5R)-3-[[[(2S,3S,5R)-3-[[[(2S,3S,5R)-3-[[[(2S,3S,5R)-3-[[[(2S,3S,5R)-3-[[[(2S,3S,5R)-3-amino-5-(6-aminopurin-9-yl)tetrahydrofuran-2-yl]methoxy-hydroxy-phosphinothioyl]amino]-5-(6-aminopurin-9-yl)tetrahydrofuran-2-yl]methoxy-hydroxy-phosphinothioyl]amino]-5-(4-amino-2-oxo-pyrimidin-1-yl)tetrahydrofuran-2-yl]methoxy-hydroxy-phosphinothioyl]amino]-5-(6-aminopurin-9-yl)tetrahydrofuran-2-yl]methoxy-hydroxy-phosphinothioyl]amino]-5-(2-amino-6-oxo-1H-purin-9-yl)tetrahydrofuran-2-yl]methoxy-hydroxy-phosphinothioyl]amino]-5-(6-aminopurin-9-yl)tetrahydrofuran-2-yl]methoxy-hydroxy-phosphinothioyl]amino]-5-(5-methyl-2,4-dioxo-pyrimidin-1-yl)tetrahydrofuran-2-yl]methoxy-hydroxy-phosphinothioyl]amino]-5-(5-methyl-2,4-dioxo-pyrimidin-1-yl)tetrahydrofuran-2-yl]methoxy-hydroxy-phosphinothioyl]amino]-5-(2-amino-6-oxo-1H-purin-9-yl)tetrahydrofuran-2-yl]methoxy-hydroxy-phosphinothioyl]amino]-5-(2-amino-6-oxo-1H-purin-9-yl)tetrahydrofuran-2-yl]methoxy-hydroxy-phosphinothioyl]amino]-5-(2-amino-6-oxo-1H-purin-9-yl)tetrahydrofuran-2-yl]methoxy-hydroxy-phosphinothioyl]amino]-5-(6-aminopurin-9-yl)tetrahydrofuran-2-yl]methoxy-hydroxy-phosphinothioyl]amino]-5-(5-methyl-2,4-dioxo-pyrimidin-1-yl)tetrahydrofuran-2-yl]methoxy-hydroxy-phosphinothioyl]oxy-2-hydroxy-ethyl]heptadecanamide
- CAS Number: 868169-64-6; as salt: 1007380-31-5
- PubChem CID: 72941969; as salt: 72941968
- DrugBank: DB05036
- ChemSpider: 34983285; as salt: 34983286
- UNII: F60NE4XB53; as salt: 2AW48LAZ4I
- KEGG: D09629; as salt: D09630
- ChEMBL: ChEMBL2107856; as salt: ChEMBL2108702

Chemical and physical data
- Formula: C_{148}H_{211}N_{68}O_{53}P_{13}S_{13}
- Molar mass: 4610.18 g·mol^{−1}
- SMILES: CCCCCCCCCCCCCCCC(=O)NCC(O)COP(O)(=S)OC[C@H]1O[C@@H](n2cc(C)c(=O)[nH]c2=O)C[C@@H]1NP(O)(=S)OC[C@H]1O[C@@H](n2cnc3c(N)ncnc32)C[C@@H]1NP(O)(=S)OC[C@H]1O[C@@H](n2cnc3c(=O)[nH]c(N)nc32)C[C@@H]1NP(O)(=S)OC[C@H]1O[C@@H](n2cnc3c(=O)[nH]c(N)nc32)C[C@@H]1NP(O)(=S)OC[C@H]1O[C@@H](n2cnc3c(=O)[nH]c(N)nc32)C[C@@H]1NP(O)(=S)OC[C@H]1O[C@@H](n2cc(C)c(=O)[nH]c2=O)C[C@@H]1NP(O)(=S)OC[C@H]1O[C@@H](n2cc(C)c(=O)[nH]c2=O)C[C@@H]1NP(O)(=S)OC[C@H]1O[C@@H](n2cnc3c(N)ncnc32)C[C@@H]1NP(O)(=S)OC[C@H]1O[C@@H](n2cnc3c(=O)[nH]c(N)nc32)C[C@@H]1NP(O)(=S)OC[C@H]1O[C@@H](n2cnc3c(N)ncnc32)C[C@@H]1NP(O)(=S)OC[C@H]1O[C@@H](n2ccc(N)nc2=O)C[C@@H]1NP(O)(=S)OC[C@H]1O[C@@H](n2cnc3c(N)ncnc32)C[C@@H]1NP(=O)(S)OC[C@H]1O[C@@H](n2cnc3c(N)ncnc32)C[C@@H]1N
- InChI: InChI=1S/C148H211N68O53P13S13/c1-5-6-7-8-9-10-11-12-13-14-15-16-17-18-97(218)160-34-69(217)38-255-282(242,295)256-51-95-74(25-102(261-95)207-37-68(4)136(221)191-148(207)229)195-274(234,287)249-45-89-78(29-106(264-89)212-61-175-115-124(155)165-56-170-129(115)212)199-277(237,290)252-48-92-81(32-109(267-92)215-64-178-118-132(215)183-143(158)187-139(118)224)202-280(240,293)254-50-94-82(33-110(269-94)216-65-179-119-133(216)184-144(159)188-140(119)225)203-281(241,294)253-49-93-79(30-107(268-93)213-62-176-116-130(213)181-141(156)185-137(116)222)200-278(238,291)246-42-86-72(23-100(260-86)205-35-66(2)134(219)189-146(205)227)193-272(232,285)245-41-85-73(24-101(259-85)206-36-67(3)135(220)190-147(206)228)194-273(233,286)248-44-88-77(28-105(263-88)211-60-174-114-123(154)164-55-169-128(114)211)198-276(236,289)251-47-91-80(31-108(266-91)214-63-177-117-131(214)182-142(157)186-138(117)223)201-279(239,292)250-46-90-76(27-104(265-90)210-59-173-113-122(153)163-54-168-127(113)210)197-275(235,288)244-40-84-71(22-99(258-84)204-20-19-96(150)180-145(204)226)192-271(231,284)247-43-87-75(26-103(262-87)209-58-172-112-121(152)162-53-167-126(112)209)196-270(230,283)243-39-83-70(149)21-98(257-83)208-57-171-111-120(151)161-52-166-125(111)208/h19-20,35-37,52-65,69-95,98-110,217H,5-18,21-34,38-51,149H2,1-4H3,(H,160,218)(H,242,295)(H2,150,180,226)(H2,151,161,166)(H2,152,162,167)(H2,153,163,168)(H2,154,164,169)(H2,155,165,170)(H,189,219,227)(H,190,220,228)(H,191,221,229)(H2,192,231,284)(H2,193,232,285)(H2,194,233,286)(H2,195,234,287)(H2,196,230,283)(H2,197,235,288)(H2,198,236,289)(H2,199,237,290)(H2,200,238,291)(H2,201,239,292)(H2,202,240,293)(H2,203,241,294)(H3,156,181,185,222)(H3,157,182,186,223)(H3,158,183,187,224)(H3,159,184,188,225)/t69?,70-,71-,72-,73-,74-,75-,76-,77-,78-,79-,80-,81-,82-,83+,84+,85+,86+,87+,88+,89+,90+,91+,92+,93+,94+,95+,98+,99+,100+,101+,102+,103+,104+,105+,106+,107+,108+,109+,110+,270?,271?,272?,273?,274?,275?,276?,277?,278?,279?,280?,281?,282?/m0/s1; Key:LVZYXEALRXBLJZ-ISQYCPACSA-N; Key:IEVORMRANFJJFR-NMZIRJKDSA-A

Imetelstat, sold under the brand name Rytelo, is an anti-cancer medication used for the treatment of myelodysplastic syndromes with transfusion-dependent anemia. Imetelstat is an oligonucleotide telomerase inhibitor. By blocking telomerase activity, imetelstat causes telomere shortening, inhibits the proliferation of malignant stem and progenitor cells and induces cell death, ultimately leading to a reduction in malignant clones.

The most common adverse reactions include decreased platelets, decreased white blood cells, decreased neutrophils, increased aspartate aminotransferase, increased alkaline phosphatase, increased alanine aminotransferase, fatigue, prolonged partial thromboplastin time, arthralgia/myalgia, COVID-19 infections, and headache.

Imetelstat was approved for medical use in the United States in June 2024. The US Food and Drug Administration (FDA) considers it to be a first-in-class medication.

== Medical uses ==
Imetelstat is indicated for the treatment of adults with low- to intermediate-1 risk myelodysplastic syndromes with transfusion-dependent anemia requiring four or more red blood cell units over eight weeks who have not responded to or have lost response to or are ineligible for erythropoiesis-stimulating agents.

== History ==
Imetelstat is the first telomerase inhibitor to enter clinical trials.

Chemically, imetelstat is a synthetic conjugate consisting of three parts: GRN163, a thio phosphoramide oligonucleotide, and a palmitoyl lipid group. GRN163 is the pharmacological component with telomerase inhibition based on experiments with poly-G oligonucleotides first conducted at the University of Nebraska Medical Center under contract with Lynx Therapeutics. The palmitic acid moiety is conjugated via a phosphothioate linkage to the backbone of the antisense oligonucleotide. Telomere shortening and lower cell viability are observed after inhibition of telomerase activity in vitro. IC50 values ranged from 50 to 200nM for 10 different pancreatic cell lines.

The efficacy of imetelstat was evaluated in IMerge (NCT02598661), a randomized (2:1), double-blind, placebo-controlled multicenter trial in 178 participants with myelodysplastic syndromes. Participants received an intravenous infusion of imetelstat 7.1 mg/kg or placebo in 28-day treatment cycles until disease progression or unacceptable toxicity. Randomization was stratified by prior red blood cell transfusion burden and by International Prognostic Scoring System (IPSS) risk group. All participants received supportive care, which included red blood cell transfusions.

== Society and culture ==
=== Legal status ===
Imetelstat was approved for medical use in the United States in June 2024. The FDA granted the application for imetelstat orphan drug designation.

In December 2024, the Committee for Medicinal Products for Human Use of the European Medicines Agency adopted a positive opinion, recommending the granting of a marketing authorization for the medicinal product Rytelo, intended for the treatment of adults with transfusion-dependent anemia due to very low, low or intermediate risk myelodysplastic syndromes. The applicant for this medicinal product is Geron Netherlands B.V. Imetelstat was authorized for medical use in the European Union in March 2025.

=== Names ===
Imetelstat is the international nonproprietary name.
