= AgeX Therapeutics =

American biotechnology company

AgeX Therapeutics, Inc.
- Type: Public
- Traded as: AMEX: AGE
- Industry: Biotechnology, aging research
- Founded: 2017
- Founder: Michael D. West
- Headquarters: Alameda, California
- Key people: Michael D. West (CEO); Gregory Bailey (chairman)
- Website: www.agexinc.com

AgeX Therapeutics, Inc. (commonly abbreviated as AgeX Therapeutics or simply AgeX) is an American biotechnology company developing medical therapeutics related to human longevity.

== History ==
AgeX Therapeutics was founded in 2017 by Michael D. West, initially as a subsidiary of BioTime, Inc. with backing from British billionaire investor Jim Mellon and others.

The chairman is Gregory Bailey, who was an early backer and board member of Medivation until its acquisition by Pfizer in 2016 for $14 billion.

In January 2020, AgeX Therapeutics announced a research collaboration with a Japanese biopharma company utilizing AgeX's UniverCyte technology platform.
