= Lineage Cell Therapeutics =

Clinical-stage biotechnology company developing novel cell therapies

Lineage Cell Therapeutics, Inc.
- Type: Public
- Traded as: AMEX: LCTX
- Industry: Biotechnology, regenerative medicine
- Founded: 1990
- Headquarters: Carlsbad, California
- Key people: Brian Culley, CEO Jill Howe, CFO George A. Samuel III, General Counsel & Corporate Strategy
- Website: lineagecell.com

Lineage Cell Therapeutics, Inc. is a clinical-stage biotechnology company developing novel cell therapies for unmet medical needs. Lineage’s programs are based on its robust proprietary cell-based therapy platform and associated in-house development and manufacturing capabilities. With this platform, Lineage develops and manufactures specialized, terminally differentiated human cells from its pluripotent and progenitor cell starting materials. These differentiated cells are developed to either replace or support cells that are dysfunctional or absent due to degenerative disease or traumatic injury or administered as a means of helping the body mount an effective immune response to cancer.

Lineage’s clinical and preclinical programs are in markets with billion dollar opportunities and include five allogeneic (“off-the-shelf”) product candidates: (i) OpRegen®, a retinal pigment epithelium transplant therapy for the treatment of dry age-related macular degeneration, which is being developed under a worldwide collaboration with Genentech, a member of the Roche Group; (ii) OPC1, an oligodendrocyte progenitor cell therapy in Phase 1/2a development for the treatment of acute spinal cord injuries; (iii) VAC2, an allogeneic dendritic cell therapy produced from Lineage's VAC technology platform for immuno-oncology and infectious disease, currently in Phase 1 clinical development for the treatment of non-small cell lung cancer; (iv) ANP1, an auditory neuronal progenitor cell therapy for the potential treatment of auditory neuropathy; and (v) PNC1, a photoreceptor neural cell therapy for the potential treatment of vision loss due to photoreceptor dysfunction or damage.

== History ==
Lineage is a clinical-stage biotechnology company developing novel cell therapies for unmet medical needs. The company changed its name from BioTime Inc. to Lineage Cell Therapeutics less than one year following its appointment of a new CEO, Brian Culley, in August 2018 and completing a series of corporate transactions including the distribution of AgeX Therapeutics, the acquisition of Asterias Biotherapeutics and conducting management changes which altogether focused the company mission on developing novel therapies based on directed differentiation and transplant of specific cell types. Since then, Lineage’s focus has been to develop therapies for degenerative retinal diseases, neurological conditions associated with demyelination, and aiding the body in detecting and combating cancer. Specifically, Lineage is testing therapies to treat dry age-related macular degeneration, spinal cord injuries, non-small cell lung cancer, auditory neuropathy, and vision loss. Lineage’s programs are based on its proprietary cell-based therapy platform and associated development and manufacturing capabilities. From this platform Lineage develops and manufactures specialized, terminally differentiated human cells from its pluripotent and progenitor cell starting materials. These differentiated cells are transplanted into a patient either to replace or support cells that are dysfunctional or absent due to degenerative disease or traumatic injury or administered as a means of helping the body mount an effective immune response to cancer. In October 2022, Lineage announced the establishment of a new R&D facility in Carlsbad, California, as well as an expansion to the company’s existing GMP manufacturing facility in Israel. The new facility in Carlsbad will broaden Lineage’s R&D capabilities in the U.S. and support the development of current and future allogeneic cell transplant programs, while the expansion in Israel will increase the company’s infrastructure, including development and optimization of larger-scale clinical manufacturing processes.

Lineage has five allogeneic, or “off-the-shelf,” cell therapy programs in clinical development:

●OpRegen®, a single-injection retinal pigment epithelium cell replacement therapy currently in a Phase 1/2a multicenter clinical trial for the treatment of advanced dry age-related macular degeneration (“AMD”) with geographic atrophy (GA). There currently are no therapies approved by the U.S. Food and Drug Administration (“FDA”) for dry AMD, which accounts for approximately 85-90% of all AMD cases and is the leading cause of blindness in people over the age of 60. Interim data from 9 months of follow-up post-injection for Cohort 4 was reported in September 2021, highlights improved baseline visions and smaller areas of GA compared to prior cohorts. Overall, OpRegen has proven to be well tolerated to date with no serious adverse events not previously reported. Overall, 8/12 of Cohort 4 patients' treated eyes showed above baseline visual acuity at the last assessment, while 9/12 of the patients' untreated eyes were below baseline visual acuity at the same assessment interval. In May 2022, data was presented at the 2022 Association for Research in Vision and Ophthalmology Annual Meeting: OpRegen Phase 1/2a clinical results support the potential for OpRegen to slow, stop or reverse disease progression in geographic atrophy secondary to age-related macular degeneration. 12-month primary endpoint data suggested OpRegen was well tolerated with an acceptable safety profile. Preliminary evidence of visual function and outer retinal structure improvements observed in five Cohort 4 patients with GA and impaired vision. In December 2021, Lineage announced that the company entered a $670 million exclusive worldwide collaboration Genentech, a member of the Roche Group, for the development and commercialization of OpRegen.

●OPC1, an oligodendrocyte progenitor cell therapy currently in a Phase 1/2a multicenter clinical trial for acute spinal cord injuries (“SCI”). This clinical trial has been partially funded by the California Institute for Regenerative Medicine (CIRM).

●VAC2, a cancer immunotherapy of antigen-presenting dendritic cells currently in a Phase 1 clinical trial in non-small cell lung cancer. This clinical trial is being funded and conducted by Cancer Research UK, the world’s largest independent cancer research charity.

●ANP1, an auditory neuronal progenitor cell therapy for the potential treatment of auditory neuropathy. Process development and preclinical activities in support of planned preclinical testing for the program are ongoing.

●PNC1, a photoreceptor neural cell therapy for the potential treatment of vision loss due to photoreceptor dysfunction or damage. Process development and preclinical activities in support of ongoing and planned preclinical testing for the program are ongoing.

== Leadership history ==
Name	Title	Years active
Mike West, Ph.D.	CEO	2007-2015
Mike West, Ph.D.	Co-CEO	2015-2018
Adi Mohanty	Co-CEO	2015-2018
Brian Culley	CEO	2018–Present

== Subsidiaries ==
Lineage's subsidiaries include:

Subsidiary	Field of Business	Lineage Ownership	Country
Asterias BioTherapeutics, Inc.	Cell therapy clinical development programs in spinal cord injury and oncology	100%	USA
Cell Cure Neurosciences Ltd.	Products to treat age-related macular degeneration	99% (1)	Israel
ES Cell International Pte. Ltd.	Stem cell products for research, including clinical grade cell lines produced under cGMP	100%	Singapore
OrthoCyte Corporation	Developing bone grafting products for orthopedic diseases and injuries	99.8%	USA

(1) Includes shares owned by Lineage and ESI
