= Mette Warburg =

Mette Warburg (23 January, 1926 - 11 March, 2015) was a Danish eye specialist. Her specialist areas were pediatric ophthalmology and ophthalmic genetics.

== Biography ==
Warburg was born in Copenhagen. Her father Erik was a notable cardiologist and her mother's name was Louise Valentiner. During World War II, the family remained in Copenhagen and Warburg joined the resistance movement at the age of 15. Her tasks were to code and decide telegrams from London about weapons and parachute drops.

In 1944, she became a student at Ingrid Jespersens Gymnasieskole. She then studied medicine at the University of Copenhagen, graduating in 1952. Starting in 1961, she began to study a Danish family with a high number of cases of a hereditary degenerative disease, and eventually identified and described the disease. She named it Norrie disease after noted Danish ophthalmologist Gordon Norrie. Her dissertation describing the disease was awarded the Doyne Memorial Medal in Oxford in 1979.

In 1963, she was appointed associate professor of ophthalmology at Aarhus University. In 1974 she was appointed chief physician at the children’s hospital in Vangede, a position she held until 1996. She also worked extensively at the Institute for the Blind and the Danish Mental Health Service, where she studied visual defects and their connection to mental health.

In 1971 Warburg and her research partner Arthur Earl Walker published the symptoms of an eye disease which they named Walker–Warburg syndrome; the syndrome is a form of autosomal recessive congenital muscular dystrophy.

She received the Tagea Brandt Scholarship in 1980 and Synoptik Foundation's Honorary Award in 1996.

== Personal life ==
Warburg married physician Erik Christiansen in 1949 and had two children, one in 1952 and another in 1955.
