= Phthisis =

Phthisis may refer to:

== Medical terms ==
- Tuberculosis, an infectious disease, historically known as phthisis
- Phthisis bulbi, shrunken, nonfunctional eye
- Phthisis miliaris, miliary tuberculosis
