= Cystic eyeball =

- Specialty: Medical genetics

Congenital cystic eye (also known as CCE or cystic eyeball) is an extremely rare ocular malformation where the eye fails to develop correctly in utero and is replaced by benign, fluid-filled tissue. Its incidence is unknown, due to the very small number of cases reported. An audit by Duke-Elder of the medical literature from 1880 to 1963 discovered only 28 cases. The term was coined in 1937 by the renowned ophthalmologist Ida Mann.

== Cause ==
Embryologically, the defect is thought to occur around day 35 of gestation, when the vesicle fails to invaginate. Dysgenesis of the vesicle later in development may result in coloboma, a separate and less severe malformation of the ocular structures.

CCE is almost always unilateral, but at least 2 cases of bilateral involvement have been described. Patients may also present with skin appendages attached to the skin surrounding the eyes. Association with intracranial anomalies has been reported.

== Treatment ==
Treatment of CCE is usually by enucleation, followed by insertion of an ocular implant and prosthesis.
