= Gordon Norrie =

Danish surgeon and ophthalmologist

Gordon Norrie (May 6, 1855 in Helsingør – October 11, 1941 in Copenhagen) was a Danish surgeon and ophthalmologist of Scottish parentage who was born in Helsingør (Elsinore). He was married to Charlotte Norrie, née Harbou (1855–1940), who was a pioneer of modern nursing.

He studied medicine at the University of Copenhagen. Originally trained as a surgeon, his interest later turned to ophthalmology, where he specialized in treatment of the blind. From 1903 to 1938 he worked as an ophthalmologist at the ophthalmology clinic of the Royal Danish Institute for the Blind, later the Statens Øjenklinik (the National Eye Clinic).

He is associated with the eponymous "Norrie disease", a rare form of hereditary blindness that he described in 1927, and referred to as atrophia oculi congenita. This disorder is characterized by severe retinal malformations, cataracts, leukocoria and atrophy of the iris.

The Gordon Norrie Centre for Genetic Eye Diseases at the National Eye Clinic in Hellerup, Copenhagen was named in his honor. The National Eye Clinic is now part of the Kennedy Center in Glostrup, another Copenhagen suburb.
