= Persistent fetal vasculature =

- Other names: Persistent hyperplastic primary vitreous, congenital retinal detachment, non-syndromic congenital retinal non-attachment
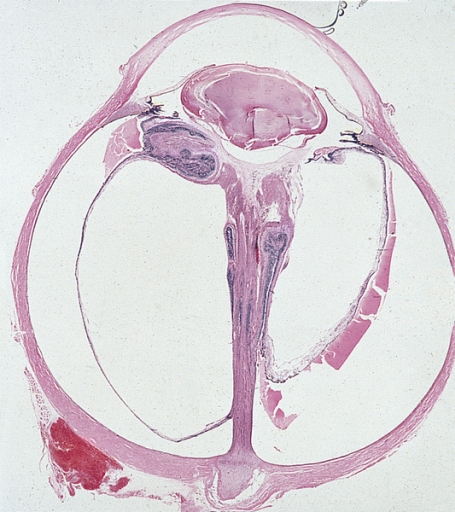
- Falciform fold of detached dysplastic retina encircles the persistent hyaloid artery that extends from the optic nerve head to the retrolental mass.
- Specialty: Ophthalmology
- Symptoms: Defects including glaucoma, cataract, falciform retinal folds, funnel- or stalk-shaped retinal detachment, spontaneous fundus hemorrhage, and a congenitally small eye.
- Complications: Retinal detachment, blindness, and glaucoma, among other chronic diseases.
- Usual onset: Neonatal, most often within 1–2 weeks of birth.
- Duration: Permanent.
- Types: Unilateral and bilateral presentations of anterior, posterior, and combination types are possible.
- Causes: Unknown; genetic factors prevalent in bilateral cases.
- Risk factors: Premature birth.
- Diagnostic method: Advanced medical imaging required, symptoms of concern include strabismus, nystagmus, and amblyopia.
- Prevention: None.
- Treatment: Surgical intervention to preserve affected eye(s). Extensive monitoring advised.
- Prognosis: Varies; even if treated early, visual outcomes are often poor, though will not generally deteriorate later in life.
- Frequency: Unknown.

Persistent fetal vasculature (PFV), also known as persistent fetal vasculature syndrome (PFVS), and until 1997 known primarily as persistent hyperplastic primary vitreous (PHPV), is a rare congenital anomaly which occurs when blood vessels called the hyaloid vasculature fail to regress as normally in-utero after the eye is fully developed. Defects which arise from this lack of vascular regression are diverse; as a result, the presentation, symptoms, and prognosis of affected patients vary widely, ranging from clinical insignificance to irreversible blindness. The underlying structural causes of PFV are considered to be relatively common, and the vast majority of cases do not warrant additional intervention. When symptoms do manifest, however, they are often significant, causing detrimental and irreversible visual impairment. Persistent fetal vasculature heightens the lifelong risk of glaucoma, cataracts, intraocular hemorrhages, and Retinal detachments, accounting for the visual loss of nearly 5% of the blind community in the developed world. In diagnosed cases of PFV, approximately 90% of patients with a unilateral disease have associated poor vision in the affected eye.

The presentation of persistent fetal vasculature is generally classified into three forms: purely anterior, purely posterior, or a mix of both. Combined expressions of both classifications are by far the most common presentation, accounting for up to 62% of all cases. Purely posterior presentations are often considered to be the most extreme variant and have the least successful surgical and visual outcomes. The majority of PFV cases are unilateral, affecting only one eye, though roughly 2.4% to 11% of cases are bilateral, impacting both eyes. Bilateral cases have generally poor visual outcomes and warrant heightened intervention regardless of presentation. They also may follow an autosomal recessive or autosomal dominant inheritance pattern, while no inheritance patterns have been conclusively identified for unilateral cases.

== Signs and symptoms ==
Persistent fetal vasculature manifests exclusively in newborn infants, generally within two weeks of birth, although it may not be diagnosed until much later. Symptomatically, the presentation of PFV is traditionally marked by "cat's eye" or leukocoria (the whitening of the pupil) and cataracts. This presentation, in particular the display of leukocoria in infants, almost perfectly mimics that of retinoblastoma, a rare and severe form of retinal cancer. These two disorders are the most frequent cause of infantile leukocoria. As a result, PFV is sometimes referred to as a “benign retinoblastoma”, due to improved relative visual outcomes. Symptoms which often draw caregivers to the presence of PFV include the presence of strabismus (crossed eyes), nystagmus (unusual or sporadic eye movements), or amblyopia (eyes which involuntarily drift from points of focus), though these symptoms are all indicative of visual disorders in general, and it is impossible to concretely identify PFV without advanced medical imaging.

The most common cause of leukocoria is the primary vitreous used in the formation of the eye during fetal development, which in PFV remains in part or in whole within the eye upon birth, and whose tissue is hazy and scarred. In unilateral cases, the abnormal eye will frequently be slightly smaller in size than the patient's unaffected eye, though this is not always the case, and the disparity gap is often reduced or erased prior to adulthood. Eye growth throughout adolescence is not generally altered by PFV, though associated conditions, in particular glaucoma, may impact this on a case-by-case basis.

Among cases clinically significant enough to warrant intervention, the most common chronic symptoms are blindness and visual impairment; without treatment, up to 70% of serious cases result in blindness. In virtually all cases, once damaged or lost, visual capacity cannot be restored. The precise extent and scope of this impairment is determined by diagnostic speed and the efficacy of surgical intervention, which may present different practical outcomes across otherwise identical patients, or even divergent outcomes in each eye, if the patient suffers from a bilateral expression of the disease. Retinal detachment, when met with surgical intervention, can often preserve peripheral sight in the affected eye. Additionally, the structural anomalies inherent to PFV do not grow with time, which may alter visual or cosmetic prospects in the long term, as the muscles surrounding the eye react and adjust to the impairment.

== Genetics ==
Although some gene involvement has been proposed, no gene has yet been reported that can account for a substantial number of the cases of PFV. The majority of cases of PFV occur sporadically; however, some other patterns of inheritance have also been reported, such as autosomal recessive form in cases with ATOH7 gene mutation on chromosome 10q2. A dominant pattern of inheritance in PFV was also described in an Egyptian family. NDP gene and COX15 gene mutations on chromosome 10 were also reported in bilateral PFV cases. Apart from the aforementioned genes, the ZNF408 gene, which was previously found in autosomal recessive retinitis pigmentosa and autosomal dominant familial exudative vitreoretinopathy (ADFEVR), was also described in PFV cases with microcornea, posterior megalolenticonus, persistent fetal vasculature, and coloboma syndrome (MPPC syndrome). FZD4 (Frizzled class receptor 4), which is a gene related to familial exudative vitreoretinopathy (FEVR), was also found to be related to some PFV cases. However, in bilateral cases of PFV with cardiovascular and central nervous system abnormalities, trisomy 13 (Patau syndrome) should be suspected and ruled out. Consultation with an ocular geneticist is recommended in cases of bilateral PFV to rule out other ocular or systemic associations, as well as for genetic counseling relative to future offspring in complex patients.

== Causes ==
A limited medical understanding of how fetal vasculature evolves in-utero has largely handicapped efforts to determine foundational causes of the anomalies inherent to persistent fetal vasculature. Advances in modern imaging and DNA analysis have begun to illustrate new aspects of this broad disorder, though there is no consensus on the causality of any one factor, and multiple factors, both environmental and genetic, are likely at play. Cases of Trisomy-13, Walker–Warburg syndrome, and Norrie diseases all frequently or exclusively include a PFV diagnosis. Differential diagnoses focus primarily on ruling out these disorders. Additionally, as is often the case with congenital anomalies, a plausible risk factor for PFV is premature birth, though this link has not been extensively researched beyond case studies.

== Diagnosis ==
Clear and quick diagnosis is a critical component for ensuring strong visual and cosmetic outcomes. While structural elements of PFV occur in as many as 3% of all births, anomalies severe enough to warrant medical attention are very rare. Though PFV presents almost exclusively in the weeks immediately following birth, obtaining a concrete diagnosis can take months. Multiple conditions are associated with PFV or encompass aspects of its clinical presentation. Overlap between these conditions, as well as the breadth of their symptoms, and the challenges of identifying impacted patients all complicate the diagnosis. These related conditions include:

- Tunica vasculosa lentis: a capillary network that branches from the hyaloid artery and covers the lens surface; If this capillary network persists, the lens does not form properly; it includes anterior and posterior divisions encircling the human lens; Anteriorly, the tunica vasculosa lentis has attachments that extend to the pupillary frill of the iris and onto the anterior lens surface; Posteriorly, the tunica vasculosa lentis anastomosis with the hyaloid system and is attached to the ciliary process.
- Hyaloid system: also called primary vitreous; composed of both the hyaloid vessel that extends from the optic nerve to the posterior lens, as well as the vasculature that fills the vitreous cavity and has many attachments to the retinal surface; normally regresses by 28 to 30 weeks gestational age. It includes the vaso hyaloidea proprea, the tunica vasculosa lentis, and the pupillary membrane.
- Anterior PFV syndrome: eyes with mostly tunica vasculosa changes
- Posterior PFV syndrome: eyes with mostly hyaloid artery changes
- Mittendorf dot: the termination of the normally regressed anterior portion of the hyaloid artery, found slightly to the nasal side of the intraocular space as the artery approaches the posterior pole of the lens; benign finding unless related to other intraocular persistent vasculature; the Brittle Star Configuration is seen when an enlarging Mittendorf Dot anastomoses with residual vessels of the posterior Tunica Vasculosa Lentis;
- Bergmeister papilla: a remnant of the posterior portion of the hyaloid artery’s fibrous sheath at the optic disc; not known to cause any visual disorders; visualized as a linear, gray structure anterior to the optic disc.

Due to PFV’s close resemblance with retinoblastoma in particular, conclusively identifying PFV through advanced medical imaging is timely and crucial for an accurate diagnosis. Retinoblastoma presents with visible calcification, the presence of calcification at minimum confirms malignancy beyond the effects of PFV. Both CT and MRI can also be used, although ultrasound is a perfectly viable option, and generally preferred by practitioners due to relative ease.

=== Differential diagnosis ===
A differential diagnostic guide to conclusively determine PFV over disorders and anomalies of similar presentations was compiled by Dr. Olga Cerón, et al. & International Ophthalmology Clinics, pp 53–62, Spring 2008:

The differential diagnosis of PHPV includes congenital cataract, retinopathy of prematurity, Norrie disease, familial exudative vitreoretinopathy and retinoblastoma. PHPV can be distinguished from an uncomplicated congenital cataract by the presence of a fibrovascular stalk and other features such as elongated ciliary processes and a shallow anterior chamber. PHPV can be differentiated from retinopathy of prematurity by its unilateral occurrence in full-term healthy infants. Norrie disease can be differentiated from PHPV by its X-linked inheritance, associated systemic manifestations, and bilaterally. Retinoblastoma is commonly distinguished from PHPV by the lack of microphthalmia and cataract.

== Treatment ==
A wide range of treatments and potential outcomes exist for PFV on account of the wide spectrum of its presentation. The primary goal is visual preservation and the protection of healthy eye tissue, with cosmetic concerns as a secondary, and often long term, consideration. When diagnosed early, surgical intervention is statistically correlated with a higher probability of viable visual preservation in the impacted eye. Anterior PFV is most often treated with observation, lensectomy and glaucoma management, whether medical or surgical. Posterior PFV is usually associated with a poor visual outcome regardless of intervention due to retinal and optic nerve abnormalities, though individualized surgical options are noting greater success since the 1990s. A bilateral disease is also typically associated with a poor outcome due to the high prevalence of posterior components. Despite this, surgery is increasingly preferred as a treatment to both presentations, as it mitigates a number of chronic risks, and may help maintain at least subpar visual capacity. In patients with a unilateral disease, “patching” is commonly prescribed as a post-operative recovery tool to maximize neurological plasticity in the ocular nerve. The healthy eye is covered with cloth or fabric, and the patient is forced to use the impacted eye for an acute duration to train visual awareness; care must be taken to avoid strain, however, which can cause discomfort or, in severe cases, atrophy. The medical benefits of patching remain debated.

Cosmetic concerns with PFV patients, similar to surgical outcomes, vary considerably, and are tailored to individual needs. Prosthetic eyes are often required in the most severe cases, though not always, and later-in-life surgery is available to correct and stabilize ocular drifting if desired. Surgical practices since the late 20th century have advanced considerably, increasingly allowing for the preferable preservation of functionally sightless eyes as a bulwark against chronic disease.

== Prognosis ==
As a result of an increased risk of glaucoma and a wide array of additional diseases, patients with severe PFV will require lifelong medical monitoring, and increased consultation with specialists and occlusive therapists to ensure developmental milestones are reached, and chronic abnormalities and illnesses can be caught early and mitigated. Generally, while vision cannot be restored, it can be stabilized through early intervention, and PFV alone does not directly cause any degenerative chronic disorders. After surgical intervention, physical therapy may be recommended to restore and enhance coordination and balance. While individual outcomes are as diverse as PFV itself, those affected by the disease often maintain outwardly normal lives, and on account of its early presentation, many fully adapt to impairment, having not known any other form of vision. Damage to depth perception and reaction speed may impair certain capabilities, though in unilateral expressions especially, PFV will not necessarily prevent patients from driving safely, engaging in athletics, and developing advanced fine motor skills. Bilateral cases experience less adaptable visual outcomes, and additional consultation may be necessary to determine if genetic components of the disease are inheritable.

== Epidemiology ==
The statistical prevalence of clinically significant PFV remains unknown, though it is believed to be quite rare. A recent pilot study in China placed the rate of persistent hyaloid artery, a structural anomaly related to PFV, as diagnosable one week after birth in 54 of 15,398 cases (a rate of 0.351%). No further consultation was conducted, however, and the long-term outcomes of those diagnosed are unknown.

== History ==
The anomalies common to PHV were first reported by Jules Germain Cloquet in 1818, and since then the disorder has been called by various names, including: persistent posterior fetal fibrovascular sheath of the lens, persistent tunica vasculosa lentis (TVL), persistent hyperplastic vitreous (PHPV), congenital retinal septum, and ablation falciform. Algernon B. Reese first described persistent hyperplastic primary vitreous (PHPV) in 1955 as a congenital malformation of the anterior portion of the primary vitreous. Due to both the hyaloid vessels and the tunica vascular lentis persisting in this condition, and the fact that “primary vitreous” refers only to the hyaloid vessels, Morton F. Goldberg introduced the term “Persistent fetal vasculature” as the condition’s new name in the 1997 Edward Jackson Memorial Lecture, stating that PHPV was a misnomer for only including those vessels that were posterior to the lens. This broader nomenclature and medical definition is generally accepted as dominant in modern scholarship.

== See also ==
- Persistent tunica vasculosa lentis
