= Red reflex =

Reflex in the eye used in health exams

The red reflex (also called the fundal reflex) refers to the reddish-orange reflection of light from the back of the eye, or fundus, observed when using an ophthalmoscope or retinoscope. The red reflex may be absent or poorly visible in people with dark eyes, and may appear yellow in Asians or green/blue in Africans.

The reflex relies on the transparency of optical media (tear film, cornea, aqueous humor, crystalline lens, vitreous humor) and reflects off the fundus back through media into the aperture of the ophthalmoscope. The red reflex is considered abnormal if there is any asymmetry between the eyes, dark spots, or white reflex (leukocoria).

Generally, it is a physical exam done on neonates and children by healthcare providers but occasionally occurs in flash photography seen when the pupil does not have enough time to constrict and reflects the fundus known as the red-eye effect.

This is a recommended screening by the American Academy of Pediatrics and American Academy of Family Physicians for neonates and children at every office visit. The objective is to detect ocular pathology that needs early intervention and ophthalmology referral to prevent visual abnormalities and more serious, but rarely, death.

It is difficult to assess the effectiveness of the technique due to the low incidence of some of the pathology the red reflex is used to detect. For example, retinoblastoma, a neuroblastic tumor that can cause a dampened or even white reflex, occurs in 1 in every 20,000 children. Regardless of the effectiveness, it is a fast, inexpensive, and noninvasive exam that could identify ocular pathology which with early identification can alter the course of the disease.

== Red reflex technique ==
There are two techniques used to assess the red reflex listed below. Both are noninvasive, inexpensive, and quick. Dilation of the eyes is unnecessary and not recommended due to the theoretical but rarely seen risks of sympathomimetics and antimuscarinic systemic effects – tachycardia (fast heart rate), hypertension (high blood pressure), and arrhythmia (abnormal heart rhythm).

=== Red reflex or individual reflex ===
The traditional red reflex refers to visualizing each eye individually. The American Academy of Pediatrics describes using a direct ophthalmoscope with a lens at 0, approximately 18 inches away in a dimly lit room on each eye.

=== Bruckner test ===
The Bruckner test differs in that one will visualize both eyes simultaneously. Unlike the red reflex, this can help determine if the patient has normal ocular alignment. In order to perform this test the patient and physician are normally approximately 2 to 3 feet away from each other.

It is also used to detect opacities in the visual axis, such as a cataract or corneal abnormality. The inequality of red reflection in both the eyes indicates unequal refraction, indicating a refractive error.

=== Limitations ===
- Pupil of a sleeping newborn may not dilate in a darkened room to allow for full assessment.
- The area of the retina reflected in the test is very small and rather than showing part of the retina it shows summation of the area.

== Differential diagnosis ==
The differential diagnosis for what could be causing an abnormal reflex ranges in severity from causes that will resolve on their own to pathology that can be life-threatening, which is why expert evaluation is essential. Below are a few of the most referenced pathologies.

=== Needs intervention ===
- Congenital cataract, refractive error, ocular alignment, retinal abnormalities.
- Strabismus, amblyopia or amblyogenic disorder.
- Retinoblastoma – a neuroblastic tumor, the most common primary intraocular malignancy, and the seventh most common malignancy – 1 in 20,000 children.
  - Of note other signs of retinoblastoma include strabismus, tearing red eye and iris discoloration.
- According to Bates' Guide to Physical Exams, retinal detachment would result in the absence of red reflex in the affected eye.

=== Benign ===
- Pupillary membrane which will resolve spontaneously.
- Mucus in the tear film which will be mobile and resolves with blinking.
- Can have different shades of reflex dependent on race and pigmentation of the fundus.

== Recommendations ==
Both the pediatric and family physician associations encourage newborn screening and continued assessment at all visits because some diseases only develop later in life. Two examples include: Familial exudative vitreoretinopathy and polar cataracts. This is considered an urgent referral that needs a "hot hand-off" or direct communication between the physician that found an abnormality and the ophthalmologist receiving the referral to discuss the patients history and current exam.

=== When to refer to children's ophthalmology ===
For any of the reasons below a newborn or child should be seen by a physician that specializes in eye disease (see ophthalmologist).

- Any abnormal exam.
- Patient history or personal history of:
  - High risk patients: premature birth, down syndrome, or cerebral palsy.
  - History or presence of leukocoria.
- Family history or any person blood related to the patient of:
  - Strabismus, amblyopia, retinoblastoma, childhood glaucoma, childhood cataracts, general ocular disease, or retinal dysplasia.

== See also ==
- Red-eye effect
- Eyeshine
- Leukocoria
- Retinal birefringence scanning
