= Coats' disease =

Human eye disease causing full or partial blindness

- Other names: Exudative retinitis, Retinal telangiectasis, Coates' disease
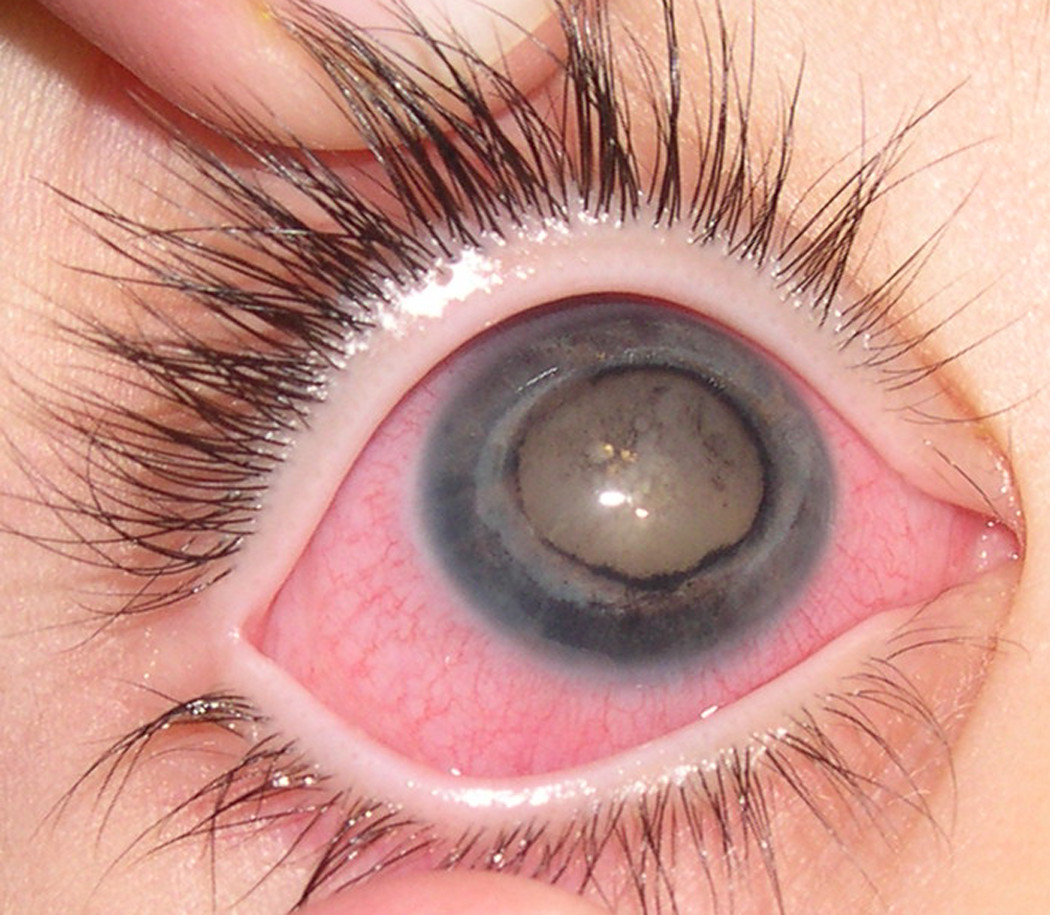
- Clinical photography of patient with Coats' disease, showing conjunctival hyperemia, mild corneal edema, posterior synechiae and cataract
- Specialty: Ophthalmology

Coats' disease is a rare congenital, nonhereditary eye disorder, causing full or partial blindness, characterized by abnormal development of blood vessels behind the retina. Coats' disease can also fall under glaucoma.

It can have a similar presentation to that of retinoblastoma.

== Signs and symptoms ==
The most common sign at presentation is leukocoria (abnormal white reflection of the retina). Symptoms typically begin as blurred vision, usually pronounced when one eye is closed (due to the unilateral nature of the disease). Often the unaffected eye will compensate for the loss of vision in the other eye; however, this results in some loss of depth perception and parallax. Deterioration of sight may begin in either the central or peripheral vision. Deterioration is likely to begin in the upper part of the vision field as this corresponds with the bottom of the eye where blood usually pools. Flashes of light, known as photopsia, and floaters are common symptoms. Persistent color patterns may also be perceived in the affected eye. Initially, these may be mistaken for psychological hallucinations, but are actually the result of both retinal detachment and foreign fluids mechanically interacting with the photoreceptors located on the retina.

One early warning sign of Coats' disease is yellow-eye in flash photography. Just as the red-eye effect is caused by a reflection off blood vessels in the back of a normal eye, an eye affected by Coats' will glow yellow in photographs as light reflects off cholesterol deposits. Children with yellow-eye in photographs are typically advised to immediately seek evaluation from an optometrist or ophthalmologist, who will assess and diagnose the condition and refer to a vitreo-retinal specialist.

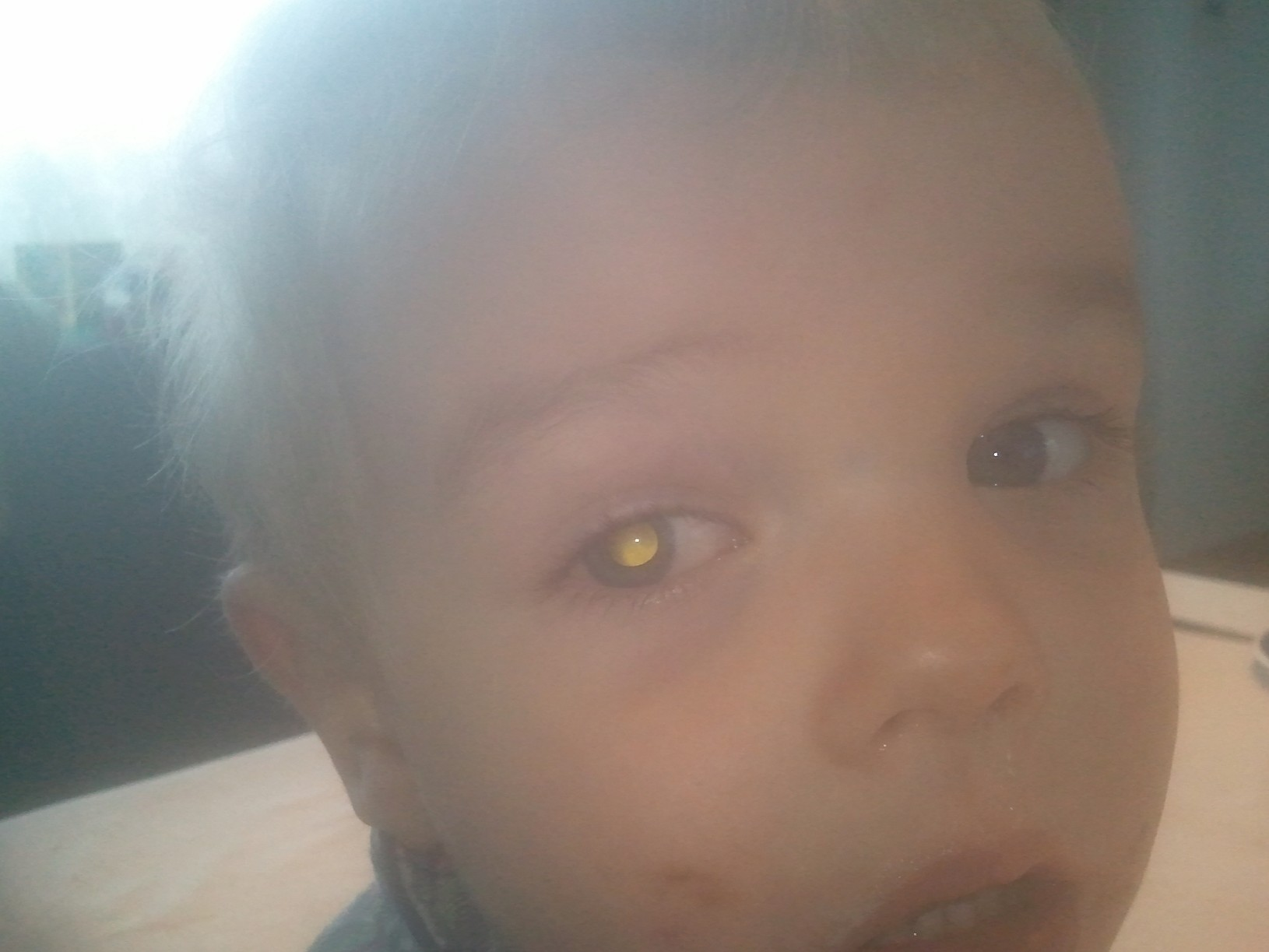
A young child with the yellow eye of Coats' disease - still in an early stage. Only visible with a flash camera.

Coats' disease itself is painless. Pain may occur if fluid is unable to drain from the eye properly, causing the internal pressure to swell, resulting in painful glaucoma.

=== Presentation ===
Coats' usually affects only one eye (unilateral) and occurs predominantly in young males 1/100,000, with the onset of symptoms generally appearing in the first decade of life. Peak age of onset is between 6–8 years of age, but onset can range from 5 months to 71 years.

Coats' disease results in a gradual loss of vision. Blood leaks from the abnormal vessels into the back of the eye, leaving behind cholesterol deposits and damaging the retina. Coats' disease normally progresses slowly. At advanced stages, retinal detachment is likely to occur. Glaucoma, atrophy, and cataracts can also develop secondary to Coats' disease. In some cases, removal of the eye may be necessary (enucleation).

Coats' disease is a rare extramuscular manifestation of facioscapulohumeral muscular dystrophy (FSHD). A single study reported it in 1 percent of FSHD patients, most often those with FSHD type 1 (FSHD1) with large D4Z4 deletions.

== Pathogenesis ==
Coats' disease is thought to result from breakdown of the blood-retinal barrier in the endothelial cells, resulting in leakage of blood products containing cholesterol crystals and lipid-laden macrophages into the retina and subretinal space. Over time, the accumulation of this proteinaceous exudate thickens the retina, leading to massive, exudative retinal detachment.

== Diagnosis ==
On funduscopic eye examination, the retinal vessels in early Coats' disease appear tortuous and dilated, mainly confined to the peripheral and temporal portions of retina. In moderate to severe Coats' disease, massive retinal detachment and hemorrhage from the abnormal vessels may be seen.

=== Imaging findings ===
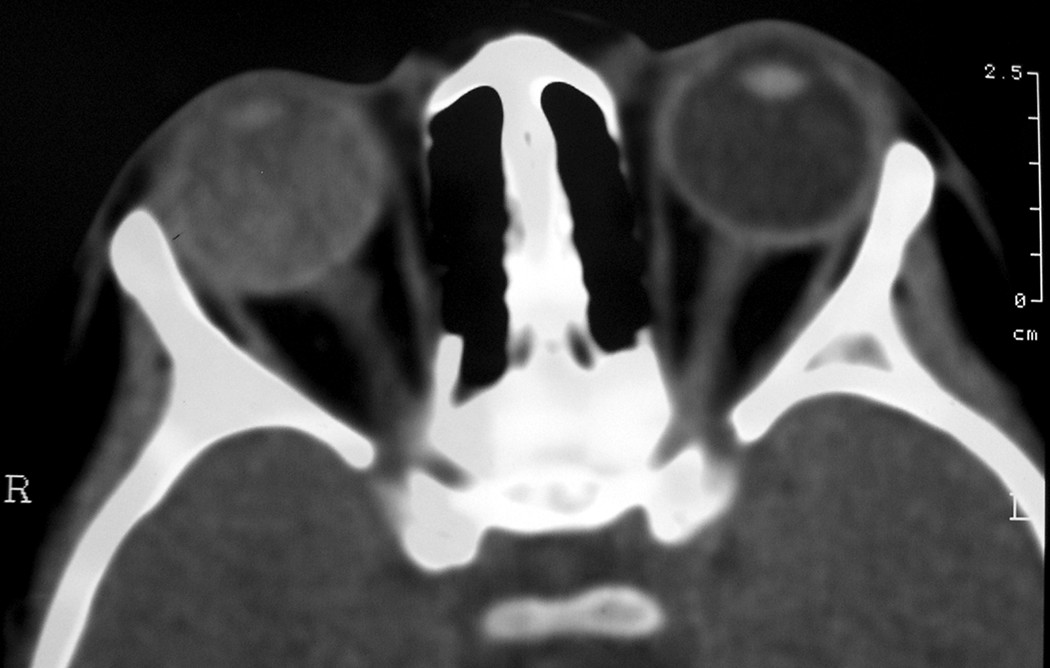
Computed Tomography image of a patient with Coats' disease, showing total exudative retinal detachment in the right eye

Imaging studies such as ultrasonography (US), Computerized Tomography (CT) and Magnetic Resonance Imaging (MRI) can aid diagnosis. On ultrasound, Coats' disease appears as a hyperechoic mass in the posterior vitreous without posterior acoustic shadowing; vitreous and subretinal hemorrhage may often be observed.

On CT, the globe appears hyperdense compared to normal vitreous due to the proteinaceous exudate, which may obliterate the vitreous space in advanced disease. The anterior margin of the subretinal exudate enhances with contrast. Since the retina is fixed posteriorly at the optic disc, this enhancement has a V-shaped configuration.

On MRI, the subretinal exudate shows high signal intensity on both T1- and T2-weighted images. The exudate may appear heterogeneous if hemorrhage or fibrosis is present. The subretinal space does not enhance with gadolinium contrast. Mild to moderate linear enhancement may be seen between the exudate and the remaining vitreous. The exudate shows a large peak at 1–1.6 ppm on proton MR spectroscopy.

=== Pathologic findings ===
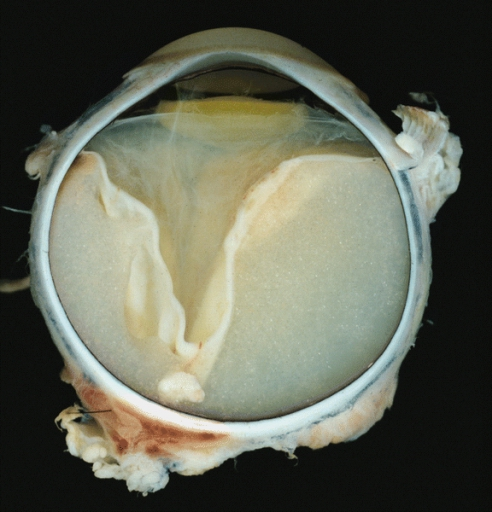
A case of Coats' disease, showing total retinal detachment with subretinal exudate containing cholesterol crystals and a fibrous nodule in the posterior pole

Grossly, retinal detachment and yellowish subretinal exudate containing cholesterol crystals are commonly seen.

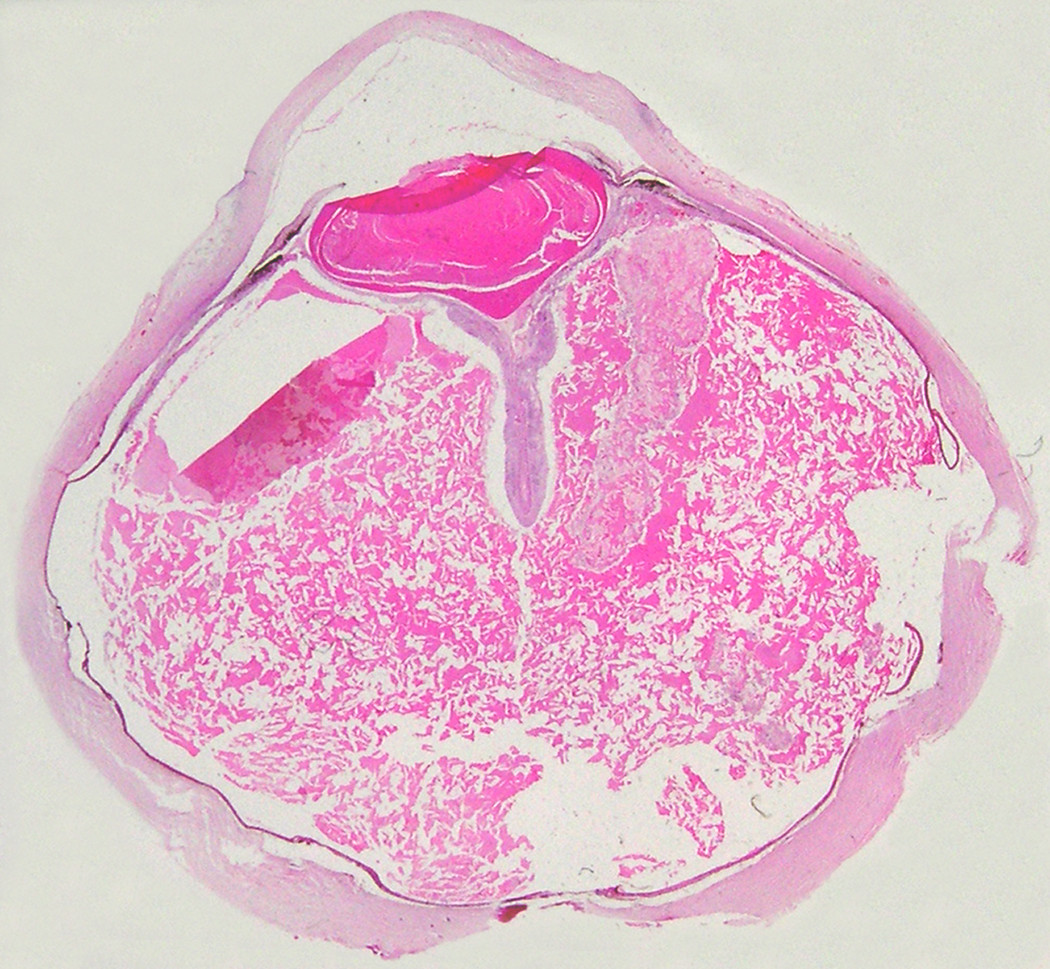
A case of Coats' disease, showing total exudative retinal detachment, and subretinal exudate containing cholesterol crystals (H&E)

Microscopically, the wall of retinal vessels may be thickened in some cases, while in other cases the wall may be thinned with irregular dilatation of the lumen. The subretinal exudate consists of cholesterol crystals, macrophages laden with cholesterol and pigment, erythrocytes, and hemosiderin. A granulomatous reaction, induced by the exudate, may be seen with the retina. Portions of the retina may develop gliosis as a response to injury.

== Treatment ==
In the early stages, there are a few treatment options. Laser surgery or cryotherapy (freezing) can be used to destroy the abnormal blood vessels, thus halting progression of the disease. However, if the leaking blood vessels are clustered around the optic nerve, this treatment is not recommended as accidental damage to the nerve itself can result in permanent blindness. Although Coats' disease tends to progress to visual loss, it may stop progressing on its own, either temporarily or permanently. Cases have been documented in which the condition even reverses itself. However, once total retinal detachment occurs, sight loss is permanent in most cases. Removal of the eye (enucleation) is an option if pain or further complications arise.

Vitrectomy has been used after retinal detachment in an infant.

== History ==
Coats' disease is named after George Coats.
