= Norrin =

Protein-coding gene in the species Homo sapiens

NDP
Available structures
PDB	Ortholog search: PDBe RCSB
PDB	List of PDB id codes 4MY2, 5BPU, 5BQ8, 5BQB, 5BQC, 5BQE, 5CL1

Identifiers
- Aliases: NDP, EVR2, FEVR, ND, Norrie disease (pseudoglioma), norrin cystine knot growth factor, norrin cystine knot growth factor NDP
- External IDs: OMIM: 300658; MGI: 102570; HomoloGene: 225; GeneCards: NDP; OMA:NDP - orthologs

Gene location (Human)
Chr.	X chromosome (human)
Band	Xp11.3	Start	43,948,776 bp
Band	Xp11.3	End	43,973,395 bp

Gene location (Mouse)
Chr.	X chromosome (mouse)
Band	X A1.2|X 12.07 cM	Start	16,751,760 bp
Band	X A1.2|X 12.07 cM	End	16,778,013 bp
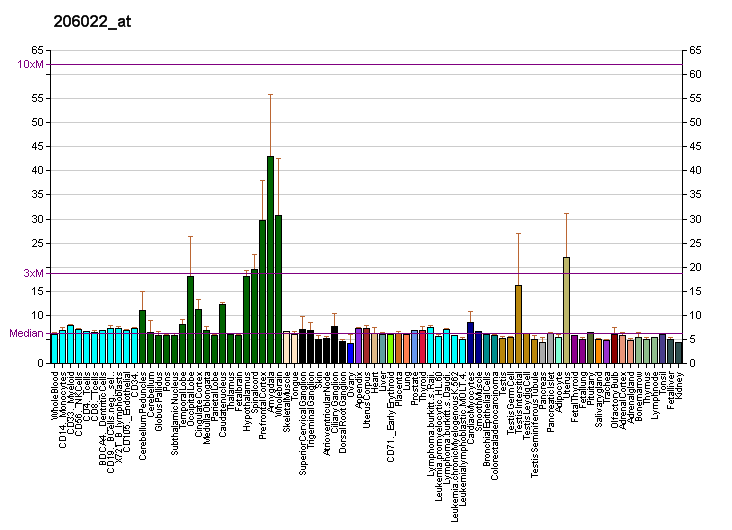
RNA expression pattern
Bgee	Human / Mouse (ortholog); Top expressed in: optic nerve; decidua; caudate nucleus; putamen; amygdala; nucleus accumbens; Brodmann area 9; right frontal lobe; internal globus pallidus; external globus pallidus / Top expressed in: lumbar spinal ganglion; respiratory epithelium; olfactory epithelium; sciatic nerve; dentate gyrus of hippocampal formation granule cell; stria vascularis; entorhinal cortex; CA3 field; perirhinal cortex; cerebellar cortex; More reference expression data
BioGPS	More reference expression data
Gene ontology
Molecular function	protein homodimerization activity; frizzled binding; protein binding; growth factor activity; cytokine activity
Cellular component	extracellular matrix; extracellular region; cell surface; extracellular space; collagen-containing extracellular matrix
Biological process	extracellular matrix-cell signaling; response to stimulus; placenta development; cell-cell signaling; positive regulation of DNA-binding transcription factor activity; vacuole organization; Wnt signaling pathway; hearing; nervous system development; positive regulation of transcription, DNA-templated; canonical Wnt signaling pathway; cell population proliferation; retina vasculature morphogenesis in camera-type eye; signal transduction; visual perception; regulation of signaling receptor activity; Norrin signaling pathway
Sources:Amigo / QuickGO
Orthologs
Species	Human	Mouse
Entrez	4693	17986
Ensembl	ENSG00000124479	ENSMUSG00000040138
UniProt	Q00604	P48744
RefSeq (mRNA)	NM_000266	NM_010883
RefSeq (protein)	NP_000257	NP_035013
Location (UCSC)	Chr X: 43.95 – 43.97 Mb	Chr X: 16.75 – 16.78 Mb
PubMed search
- Wikidata
View/Edit Human	View/Edit Mouse

Norrin, also known as Norrie disease protein or X-linked exudative vitreoretinopathy 2 protein (EVR2) is a protein that in humans is encoded by the NDP gene. Mutations in the NDP gene are associated with the Norrie disease.

== Function ==
Signaling induced by the protein Norrin regulates vascular development of vertebrate retina and controls important blood vessels in the ear. Norrin binds with high affinity to Frizzled 4, and Frizzled 4 knockout mice exhibit abnormal vascular development of the retina.

== Clinical significance ==
NDP is the genetic locus identified as harboring mutations that result in Norrie disease. Norrie disease is a rare genetic disorder characterized by bilateral congenital blindness that is caused by a vascularized mass behind each lens due to a maldeveloped retina (pseudoglioma).
