= Leukocoria =

Abnormal white reflection from the eye's retina

- Other names: Leucocoria, white pupillary reflex
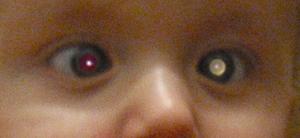
- A child with leukocoria due to retinoblastoma in the left eye
- Specialty: Ophthalmology, pediatrics

Leukocoria (also white pupillary reflex) is an abnormal white reflection from the retina of the eye. Leukocoria resembles eyeshine, but leukocoria can also occur in animals that lack eyeshine because their retina lacks a tapetum lucidum.

Leukocoria is a medical sign for a number of conditions, including Coats disease, congenital cataract, corneal scarring, melanoma of the ciliary body, Norrie disease, ocular toxocariasis, persistence of the tunica vasculosa lentis (PFV/PHPV), retinoblastoma, and retrolental fibroplasia.

Because of the potentially life-threatening nature of retinoblastoma, a cancer, that condition is usually considered in the evaluation of leukocoria. In some rare cases (1%) the leukocoria is caused by Coats' disease (leaking retinal vessels).

== Diagnosis ==
On photographs taken using a flash, instead of the familiar red-eye effect, leukocoria can cause a bright white reflection in an affected eye.

Leukocoria can be detected by a routine eye exam (see Ophthalmoscopy). For screening purposes, the red reflex test is used. In this test, when a light is shone briefly through the pupil, an orange red reflection is normal. A reflection with any other color, like yellow or a pale white is considered leukocoria.

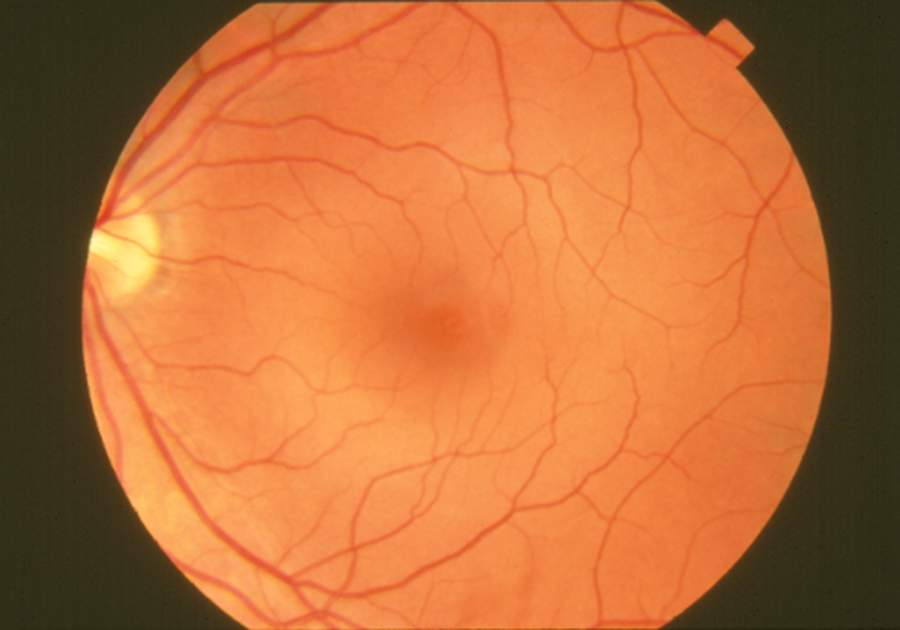
A normal human fundus

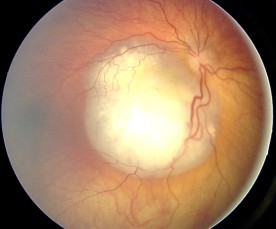
A fundus with retinoblastoma

== Society ==
- The fictional serial killer known as "The Collector", the main antagonist of the films The Collector (2009) and The Collection (2012), had the condition in both eyes. (confirmed by first movie actor Juan Fernández de Alarcon)
