= Persistent tunica vasculosa lentis =

- Anatomy human eye (vitreous humor)
- Specialty: Ophthalmology

Persistent tunica vasculosa lentis is a congenital ocular anomaly. It is a form of persistent fetal vasculature (PFV).

It is a developmental disorder of the vitreous. It is usually unilateral and first noticed in the neonatal period. It may be associated with microphthalmos, cataracts, and increased intraocular pressure. Elongated ciliary processes are visible through the dilated pupil. A USG B-scan confirms diagnosis in the presence of a cataract.

== See also ==
- Persistent fetal vasculature
- Tunica vasculosa lentis
