= Phthisis bulbi =

Shrunken, non-functional eye

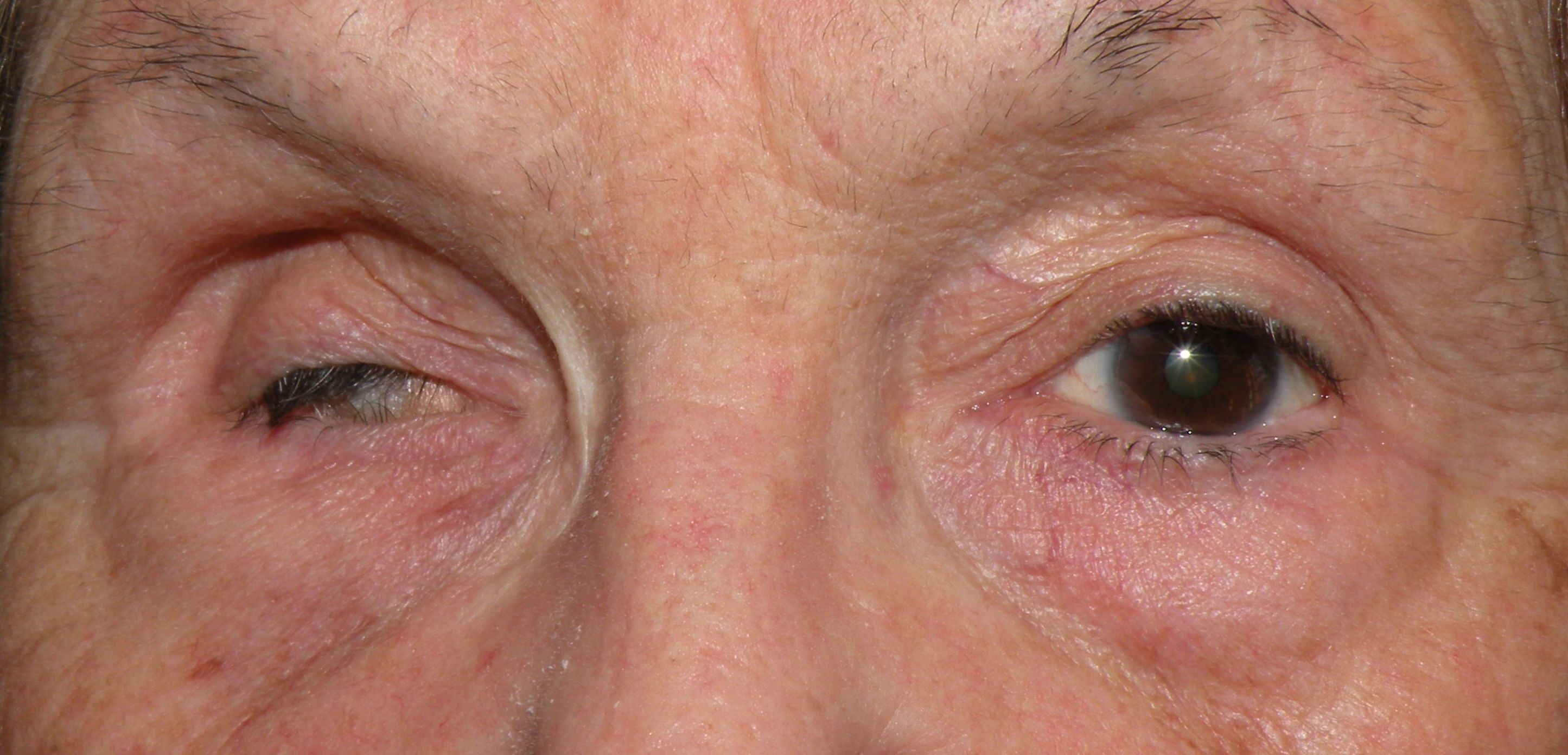
- Phthisis bulbi of the right eye
- Pronunciation: /ˈθaɪ.sɪs/, /ˈtaɪ.sɪs/, /ˈfθaɪ.sɪs/
- Specialty: Ophthalmology
- Symptoms: Shrunken eye with little or no function
- Causes: Eye surgery
- Risk factors: Eye injury, Eye surgery, eye disease
- Prevention: By treating the condition before the eye goes to pthisis
- Treatment: Surgery
- Prognosis: Usually permanent blindness in affected eye
- Deaths: 0

Phthisis bulbi is a shrunken, non-functional eye. It may result from severe eye disease, inflammation or injury, or it may represent a complication of eye surgery. Treatment options include insertion of a prosthesis, which may be preceded by enucleation of the eye.

== Symptoms and signs ==
The affected eye is shrunken, and has little to no vision. The intraocular pressure in the affected eye is very low or nonexistent. The layers in the eye may be fused together, thickened, or edematous. The eyelids may be glued shut. The eye may be soft when palpated. Under a microscope there may be deposits of calcium or bone, and the lens is often affected by cataracts.

== Causes ==
It can be caused by injury, including burns to the eye, or long-term eye disease or inflammation. End-stage glaucoma can cause it. It can often complicate eye surgery. Other common causes include cancer, retinal detachment, vascular lesions, infection, and inflammation.

== Treatment ==
Treatment for the affected eye is often futile. Usually, treatment is to end the pain in the affected eye and for cosmetic purposes, not to restore vision. It can be removed, a procedure called enucleation of the eye. Sometimes, though, it is possible to transplant only parts of the eye, and some vision can be restored.
