= Scleral buckle =

Procedure to repair retinal detachment

- MeSH: D012591

A scleral buckle is one of several ophthalmologic procedures that can be used to repair a retinal detachment. Retinal detachments are usually caused by retinal tears, and a scleral buckle can be used to close the retinal break, both for acute and chronic retinal detachments.

Scleral buckles come in many shapes and sizes. A silicone sponge (with air filled cells) is a cylindrical element that comes in various sizes. An encircling band is a thin silicone band sewn around the circumference of the sclera of the eye. A solid silicone grooved tyre element is also used. Buckles are often placed under a band to create a dimple on the eye wall.

The scleral buckle is secured around the eyeball under the conjunctiva. This moves the wall of the eye closer to the detached retina. This alteration in the relationships of the tissues seems to allow the fluid which has formed under the retina to be pumped out, and the retina to re-attach. The physics or physiology of this process are not fully understood.

Retinal detachment surgery usually also involves the use of cryotherapy or laser photocoagulation. The laser or cryotherapy forms a permanent adhesion around the retinal break and prevents further accumulation of fluid and re-detachment. The usage of scleral buckle is a source of debate only for complex retinal detachment surgery amongst surgeons, and research has been conducted to compare safety and effectiveness outcomes of scleral buckling, pars plana vitrectomy with scleral buckle versus pars plana victrectomy without scleral buckle.

Scleral buckles are done using local or general anesthesia and are often done as outpatient procedures. In the majority of treatments the buckle is left in place permanently, although in some instances the buckles can be removed after the retina heals. The buckle may also be removed in the event of infection.

A link between scleral buckles and Adie syndrome may exist.Results from three randomized controlled trials of 274 patients comparing retinal detachment outcomes from pneumatic retinopexy versus scleral buckle found some evidence suggesting that scleral buckle was less likely to result in a recurrence of retinal detachment than pneumatic retinopexy but that overall evidence is of low quality and insufficient.

== See also ==
- Charles Schepens
- Eye surgery
