= Enucleation of the eye =

Type of ocular surgery

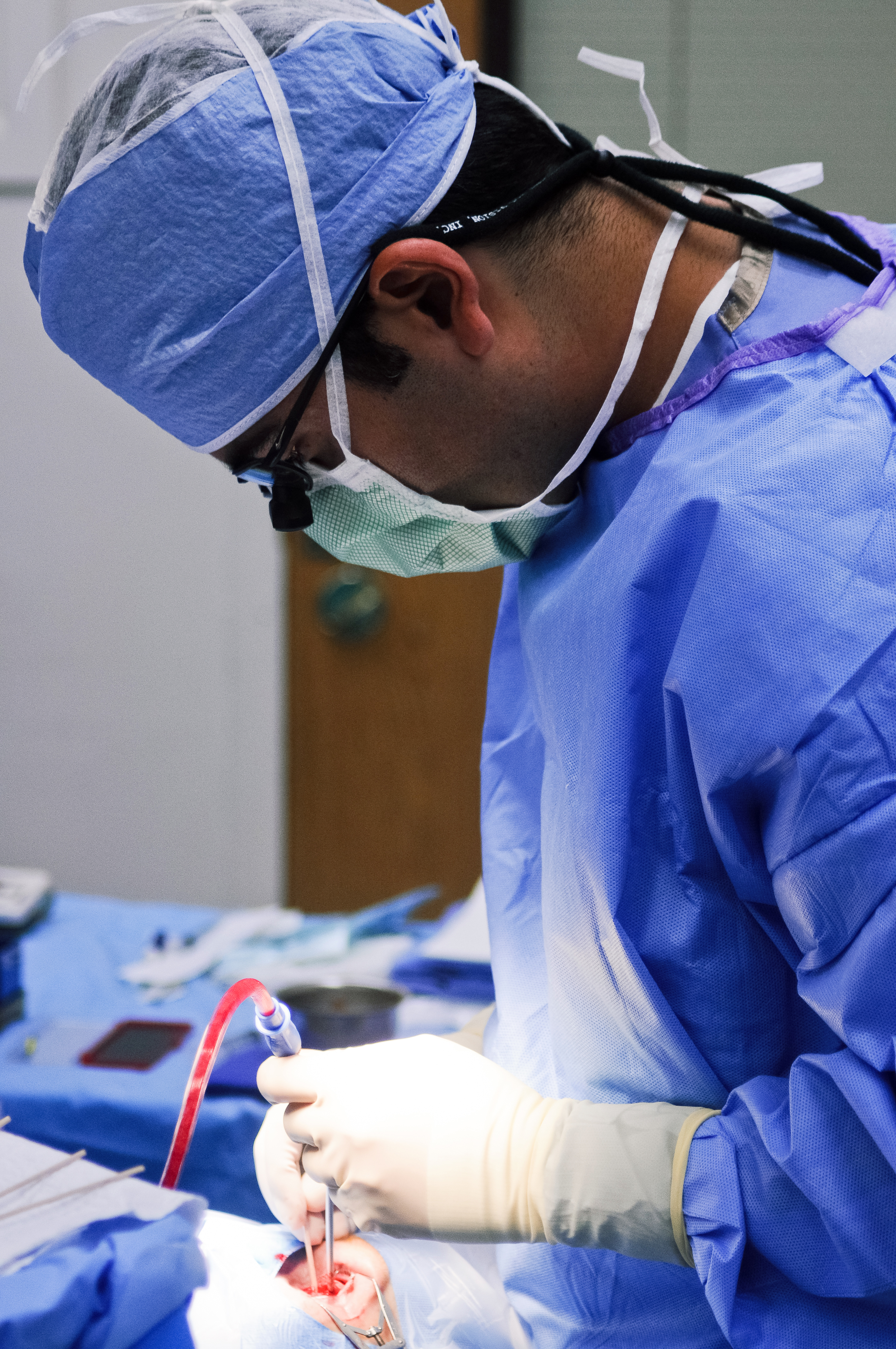
- An oculoplastic surgeon performing an enucleation of the eye.
- ICD-9-CM: 16.4
- MeSH: D015353

Enucleation is the removal of the eye that leaves the eye muscles and remaining orbital contents intact. This type of ocular surgery is indicated for a number of ocular tumors, in eyes that have sustained severe trauma, and in eyes that are otherwise blind and painful.

Self-enucleation or auto-enucleation (oedipism) and other forms of serious self-inflicted eye injury are an extremely rare form of severe self-harm that usually results from mental illnesses involving acute psychosis. The name comes from Oedipus of Greek mythology, who gouged out his own eyes.

== Classification ==
There are three types of eye removal:

- Evisceration – removal of the iris, lens, and internal eye contents, but with the sclera and attached extraocular muscles left behind
- Enucleation of the eye – removal of the eyeball, but with the eyelids and adjacent structures of the eye socket remaining. An intraocular tumor excision requires an enucleation, not an evisceration.
- Exenteration – removal of the contents of the eye socket, including the eyeball, fat, muscles, and other adjacent structures of the eye. The eyelids may also be removed in cases of cutaneous cancers and unrelenting infection. Exenteration is sometimes done together with maxillectomy (removal of the maxilla).

== Indications ==
- Cancer of the eye, such as retinoblastoma and uveal melanoma
- Congenital cystic eye
- End-stage glaucoma
- Phthisis bulbi
- In cases of sympathetic ophthalmia (inflammation of the eye) to prevent travel to the other eye, which, if untreated, can cause blindness
- Constant infection in a blind or otherwise useless eye
- Ocular pythiosis and some fungal infections
- Painful, blind eye
- Severe injury of the eye when the eye cannot be saved or attempts to save the eye have failed, such as after a globe rupture
- In a deceased person, so the cornea can be used for a living person who needs a corneal transplant by a surgical operation called keratoplasty

== Orbital implants and ocular prostheses ==
Removal of the eye by enucleation or evisceration relieve pain and minimize further risk to life and well-being of an individual with the above noted conditions. In addition, procedures to remove the eye should address the resultant appearance of the orbit. Orbital implants and ocular prostheses are used by the surgeon to restore a more natural appearance.

An orbital implant is placed after removal of the eye to restore volume to the eye socket and enhance movement or motility of an ocular prosthesis and eyelids. The eyeball is a slightly elongated sphere with a diameter of approximately 24 millimetres. To avoid a sunken appearance to the eye socket, an implant approximating this volume can be placed into the space of the removed eye, secured, and covered with Tenon's capsule and conjunctiva. Implants can be made of many materials with the most common being hydroxylapatite, metal alloy, acrylic, or glass.

Later, once the conjunctiva have healed and post-operative swelling has subsided, an ocular prosthesis can be placed to provide the appearance of a natural eye. The prosthesis is fabricated by an ocularist. Its form is that of a cupped disc so that it can fit comfortably in the pocket behind the eyelids overlying the conjunctiva that covers the orbital implant. The external portion of the ocular prosthesis is painted and finished to mimic a natural eye color, shape and luster. It can be removed and cleaned periodically by the individual or a care giver.

The two part system of orbital implant and ocular prosthesis provides a stable, and well tolerated aesthetic restoration of the eye socket. Although vision is not restored by removal of the eye with placement of an orbital implant and ocular prosthesis, a natural appearance can result. The implant, along with the attached, visible ocular prosthesis, can be moved by intact extraocular muscles that will track or move simultaneously with the other eye. The eyelids are able to move and blink over the prosthesis as well.

== See also ==
- Eye-gouging – Act of pressing or tearing the eye
- Phantom eye syndrome
