= DecisionDx-UM =

DecisionDx-UM is a prognostic test that accurately determines the metastatic risk associated with ocular melanoma tumors of the eye. Ocular melanoma is a term commonly used to describe tumors of the uveal tract such as uveal melanoma, choroidal melanoma, ciliary body melanoma, and iris melanoma. The DecisionDx-UM test was clinically validated on these tumors of the uveal tract. DecisionDx-UM assesses the gene expression profile (GEP) of a subset of genes which are differentially expressed in primary tumor cells compared to cells that have undergone transformation to a metastatic phenotype.

The test classifies tumors as:

- Class 1A (low metastatic risk),
- Class 1B (long-term metastatic risk),
- Class 2 (immediate, high metastatic risk).

Also referred to as the gene expression profile, the test has been directly compared to all other clinical and pathological factors, such as chromosome 3 status (monosomy 3), cytopathology and tumor size and the DecisionDx-UM test was shown to be more accurate than these other factors. The DecisionDx-UM test has become standard of care in the majority of ocular oncology centers in the U.S. and is recommended by the American Joint Committee on Cancer (AJCC). The AJCC recommends this testing for all patients with a diagnosis of uveal melanoma as the results are 'clinically significant'. Accurate results are achieved using both fine needle aspirate biopsies (FNAB) or formalin fixed, paraffin embedded (FFPE) tumor tissue. The prognostic information provided by DecisionDx-UM helps physicians and their patients make individualized decisions about the surveillance and therapeutic options that are most appropriate. The DecisionDx-UM test was exclusively licensed from Washington University in St. Louis and is only available through Castle Biosciences, Incorporated.

== Uveal Melanoma ==
While rare, uveal melanoma (ocular melanoma) is the most common form of eye cancer and the second most common form of melanoma. Uveal melanoma tumors arise in the uveal tract of the eye which includes the iris, ciliary body, and choroid. Treatment for the primary eye tumor consists of eye-sparing therapy (plaque radiotherapy or proton beam irradiation) or eye removal (enucleation). Both are highly effective with 'cure' rates above 90%. However, as has been well documented in multiple publications including the Collaborative Ocular Melanoma Study (COMS), in nearly 50% of patients the melanoma has likely already metastasized by the time the primary eye tumor has been diagnosed and treated. The majority of these metastases are microscopic and clinically undetectable at the time of primary tumor diagnosis. Unfortunately, many of the current diagnostic techniques (including imaging and liver function tests) are not able to accurately detect micrometastases until tumor nodules have grown considerably, and likely become resistant to therapy.

The lack of accurate prognostic tests to identify which patients are at risk of developing clinically overt metastatic disease has been a significant issue in the management of individual patients with uveal melanoma. Without accurate measures of individual metastatic risk, it is impossible to identify which patients are at high risk for clinical metastasis, which can then lead to either over or under-treatment of any given patient. The DecisionDx-UM test was developed to provide improved individual metastatic risk assessment which allows for more appropriate surveillance and treatment planning.

== DecisionDx-UM GEP Assay ==
=== Discovery ===
The gene expression profile measured by DecisionDx-UM was discovered in the laboratory of J. William Harbour at Washington University in St. Louis. The application of microarray analysis to primary untreated uveal melanomas revealed that the tumors clustered into two discreet groups based upon their expression profiles. Filtering of the differentially expressed gene set led to the identification of a set of genes able to discriminate between Class 1 and Class 2 tumors.

In subsequent experiments, Dr. Harbour's group assembled microarray information from a larger subset of uveal melanoma tumor samples, and were able to identify candidate discriminatory genes for further analysis. The genetic expression profiles of those discriminating genes were verified in uveal melanoma tumors using quantitative polymerase chain reaction (qPCR) methods, and predictive modeling was performed to identify an optimum set of genes able to accurately predict metastatic risk and report class assignments. The final assay evaluated 12 discriminating genes and 3 control genes to determine Class 1 (low risk) and Class 2 (high risk) tumors, and was validated in a 609 patient multicenter study that included FNAB and FFPE samples.

=== Prognostic Accuracy ===
The current DecisionDx-UM platform was clinically validated in the COOG study, which included 514 patients with UM treated at 12 ocular oncology centers in the United States between 1998 and 2010. The report provides data showing that DecisionDx-UM has a high technical success rate (>95%).

=== Clinical Technical Success ===
Since the initial offering of DecisionDx-UM in December 2009, more than 800 clinical orders have been received for analysis by Castle Biosciences from over 55 ocular oncology centers across the U.S. Technical success and class determination was achieved for 96.2% of the samples. Most of the failures were due to improper biopsy collection and/or handling. Tumor biopsy collection is critical for the successful reporting of metastatic risk Class assignment following DecisionDx-UM testing.

=== DecisionDx-UM Ordering and Reporting ===
Castle Biosciences, Incorporated only accepts service orders for DecisionDx-UM from licensed physicians (most commonly ocular oncologists, ophthalmologists, or retina specialists) who care for patients diagnosed with uveal melanoma. Physicians who are first time customers must contact Castle's for information and to establish an account. Sample submission requires submission of a DecisionDx-UM Requisition Form to be completed and faxed to Castle. FNAB specimens require use of a specimen collection kit, provided by Castle, to stabilize the sample and reduce the chance of technical failure. This kit must be received by the ordering physician prior to sample collection. Castle staff is available to assist with logistics concerning sample collection and shipping.

Castle provides a report to the ordering physician that will classify the tumor as Class 1A, Class 1B, or Class 2. The report will also describe the statistics associated with the classification, and provide a discriminant value that reflects the confidence regarding the classification. The information provided in the report from Castle identifies how likely a tumor is to metastasize (spread) with this risk being categorized as low (Class 1A), intermediate (Class 1B), or high (Class 2).

== Other UM Metastasis Prognostic Factors ==
=== Histopathologic Factors and Imaging Techniques ===
Historically there are several clinical and pathologic features that have been statically associated with metastasis. Tumor size, tumor location, patient age and vascular structure have all been reported to correlate with metastatic onset and patient survival. While generalities regarding the UM patient population at large can be made based on these factors, none, alone or collectively, has demonstrated predictive accuracy with regard to metastatic activity.

Imaging techniques used to detect metastatic activity also have limitations. Systemic metastases are detected by Positron Emission Tomography (PET) imaging at the time of the original diagnosis in less than 4% of UM patients Magnetic Resonance Imaging (MRI) has recently been reported more sensitive than PET for identifying metastasis from choroidal melanoma, but MRI requires tumor mass greater than 5mm in size. Thus, current imaging technology lacks the sensitivity for detecting micrometastases that may be present at the time of primary diagnosis of uveal melanoma.

=== Genetic Factors ===
Genetic analysis techniques have led to the identification of chromosomal abnormalities associated with metastatic tumor progression in uveal melanoma. Loss of heterozygosity, loss of entire alleles from chromosomes, partial chromosomal addition and chromosomal deletion and single nucleotide polymorphisms (SNP) have been associated with uveal melanoma metastatic lesions. In particular, chromosomes 1, 3, 6 and 8 have been extensively studied for their association with shorter survival time and development of metastatic disease.

While genetic aberrations in chromosomes 1, 6 and 8 have not independently been able to predict disease progression, cytogenetic profiling of chromosome 3 has uncovered an important genetic region highly associated with metastatic onset in uveal melanoma patients. Chromosome 3 abnormalities have been analyzed using multiple techniques, including fluorescence in situ hybridization (FISH), chromosomal in situ hybridization (CISH), array comparative genomic hybridization (aCGH), SNP, multiplex ligation-dependent probe amplification (MLPA), and microsatellite analysis.

Despite a wealth of data that has identified the association of chromosome 3 mutation with UM metastasis, the clinical application of this data has yet to be realized. Reasons for the uncertainty of chromosome 3 clinical use include:

- high false-positive rates (ranging from 5-22%)
- high false-negative rates (ranging from 4-50%)
- high technical failure rates (up to 50%) due to the large tissue requirement for current analysis techniques
- the adverse effects of cellular heterogeneity on chromosome 3 cytogenetic analysis.

Furthermore, unlike the DecisionDx-UM test, there are no published, peer-reviewed studies that demonstrate clinical validation in an independent set of patients.

== Castle Biosciences, Incorporated ==
Castle Biosciences, Inc.
- Traded as: Nasdaq: CSTL

Castle Biosciences, Incorporated is a molecular diagnostics company that develops diagnostic and prognostic assays for rare cancers. Castle's mission is to serve individuals afflicted with rare cancers by offering accurate prognostic tests which provide information for making critical decisions regarding an individual's surveillance and treatment regimens. In addition to DecisionDx-UM, Castle offers prognostic tests for melanoma (DecisionDx-Melanoma) and squamous cell carcinoma (DecisionDx-SCC). Castle is based in Friendswood, TX, and has operations in Phoenix, AZ.
