= H. B. Stallard =

British athlete

H. B. "Henry" Stallard
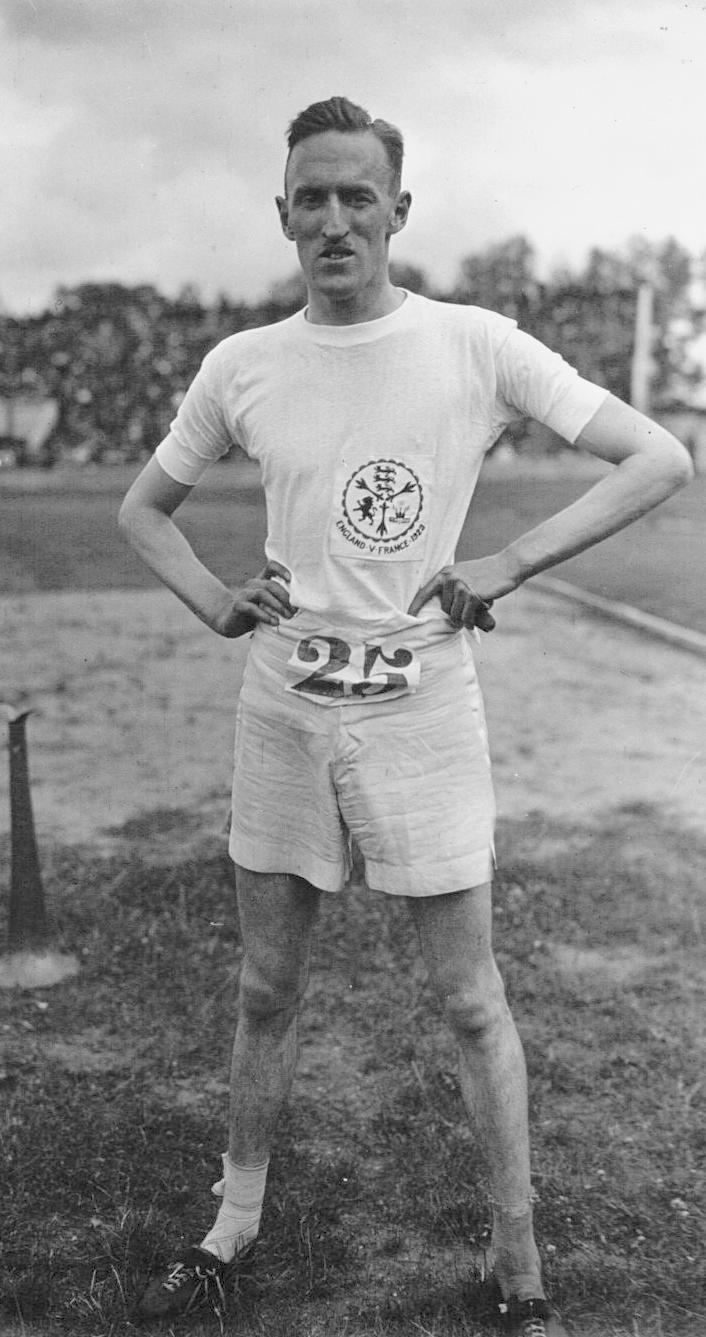
- Henry Stallard in 1923

Personal information
- Born: 28 April 1901 Leeds, England
- Died: 21 October 1973 (aged 72) Hartfield, East Sussex, England
- Education: University of Cambridge
- Height: 1.86 m (6 ft 1 in)
- Weight: 75 kg (165 lb)

Sport
- Sport: Athletics
- Event: 800 m
- Club: University of Cambridge AC; Achilles Club

Achievements and titles
- Personal bests: 440 yd – 50.0 (1925); 800 m – 1:53.0 (1924); 1500 m – 3:55.6 (1924)
Medal record
Representing Great Britain
Olympic Games
Bronze medal – third place	1924 Paris	1500 metres

Hyla Bristow Stallard MBE FRCS (28 April 1901 – 21 October 1973), published as H. B. Stallard and familiarly known as Henry Stallard, was an English middle-distance runner and ophthalmologist.

== Early life ==
Stallard was educated at Sherborne School (1914–1919), an independent school for boys in Sherborne, Dorset, before going up to Gonville and Caius College, Cambridge, where he studied medicine, and was a contemporary of Harold Abrahams.

== Athletics ==
Stallard was a member of the University Athletics team in 1920, 1921 and 1922. He finished second behind Albert Hill in the 1 mile event at the 1921 AAA Championships and finished second behind Duncan McPhee in the mile event at the 1922 AAA Championships. Additionally, he was part of the Oxbridge team that set a world record in the 4×880 yd relay in 1922.

Stallard became the national 1 mile champion after winning the AAA Championships title at the 1923 AAA Championships and the 880 yards British champion at the 1924 AAA Championships.

Stallard competed at the 1924 Summer Olympics held in Paris; he won the bronze medal in the 1500 metres (time 3:55.6) and finished fourth in the 800 metres (time 1:53.0), despite sustaining a stress fracture in the right foot in the 1500 m heats. He was portrayed by Daniel Gerroll in the 1981 Oscar-winning movie Chariots of Fire.

Stallard is the only athlete that won the Amateur Athletic Association of England titles over 440 yd (1925), 880 yd (1924), and mile (1923). He withdrew at the last minute from the 1926 AAA Championships after a copious blood donation to a patient at his hospital.

== Medical career ==
Besides athletics, Stallard was a prominent doctor. As ophthalmic surgeon to St Bartholomew's Hospital and Moorfields Eye Hospital, he pioneered cobalt plaque radiotherapy for the treatment of ocular tumours, particularly in children. He was elected as president of the Ophthalmological Society in 1972.
