= Eric Walker =

Eric Walker may refer to:

- Eric Walker (footballer) (born 1933), Scottish former footballer
- Eric Walker (RAF officer) (1896–1983), British World War I flying ace
- Eric A. Walker (engineer) (1910–1995), president of Penn State University, 1956–1970
- Eric A. Walker (historian) (1886–1976), British historian
- Eric Sherbrooke Walker (1887–1976), hotelier and military officer
- Eric Walker (entertainer) (born 1970), music producer and former actor
- Frederick Walker (pathologist) (1934–2017), Regius Professor, commonly known as Eric
