= Gene signature =

A gene signature or gene expression signature is a single or combined group of genes in a cell with a uniquely characteristic pattern of gene expression that occurs as a result of an altered or unaltered biological process or pathogenic medical condition. This is not to be confused with the concept of gene expression profiling. Activating pathways in a regular physiological process or a physiological response to a stimulus results in a cascade of signal transduction and interactions that elicit altered levels of gene expression, which is classified as the gene signature of that physiological process or response. The clinical applications of gene signatures breakdown into prognostic, diagnostic and predictive signatures. The phenotypes that may theoretically be defined by a gene expression signature range from those that predict the survival or prognosis of an individual with a disease, those that are used to differentiate between different subtypes of a disease, to those that predict activation of a particular pathway. Ideally, gene signatures can be used to select a group of patients for whom a particular treatment will be effective.

== Timeline of gene signature detection ==
In 1995, 2 studies conducted identified unique approaches to analyzing global gene expression of a genome which collectively promoted the value of identifying and analyzing gene signatures for physiological relevance. The first study reports a technique that improves expressed sequence tag (EST) analysis, known as Serial Analysis of Gene Expression (SAGE) that hinged on sequencing and quantifying mRNA samples which acquired levels of gene expression that eventually revealed characteristic gene expression patterns.

The second study identified a technique that is now widely known as the microarray which quantifies complementary DNA (cDNA) hybridization on a glass slide to analyze the expression of many genes in parallel. These studies drew greater attention to the wealth of information that analysis of gene signatures bear that may or may not be physiologically relevant.

Pressing forward, the latter technique has revolutionized research in genetics and DNA chip technology as it is a widely adopted technique to profile gene expression signatures such that these physiological responses can be cataloged in repositories such as NCBI Gene Expression Omnibus. This catalogue of prognostic, diagnostic and predictive gene expression signatures allow for predictions of onset of pathogenic diseases in patients, tumour and cancer classification, and enhanced therapeutic strategies that predict the optimal target candidates subjects and genes.

Today, microarrays and other quantitative methods such as RNA-seq that encompass gene expression profiling, are moving towards promotion of re-analysis and integration of the large, publicly available database of gene expression signatures and profiles to uncover the full threshold of information these expression signatures hold.

== Types of gene signatures ==
=== Prognostic gene signature ===
Prognostic refers to predicting the likely outcome or course of a disease. Classifying a biological phenotype or medical condition based on a specific gene signature or multiple gene signatures, can serve as a prognostic biomarker for the associated phenotype or condition. This concept termed prognostic gene signature, serves to offer insight into the overall outcome of the condition regardless of therapeutic intervention. Several studies have been conducted with focus on identifying prognostic gene signatures with the hopes of improving the diagnostic methods and therapeutic courses adopted in a clinical setting. Prognostic gene signatures are not a target of therapy; they offer additional information to consider when discussing details such as duration or dosage or drug sensitivity etc. in therapeutic intervention. The criteria a gene signature must meet to be deemed a prognostic marker include demonstration of its association with the outcomes of the condition, reproducibility and validation of its association in an independent group of patients and lastly, the prognostic value must demonstrate independence from other standard factors in a multivariate analysis. The applications of these prognostic signatures include prognostic assays for breast cancer, hepatocellular carcinoma, leukaemia and are continually being developed for other types of cancers and disorders as well.

=== Diagnostic gene signatures ===
A diagnostic gene signature serves as a biomarker that distinguishes phenotypically similar medical conditions that have a threshold of severity consisting of mild, moderate or severe phenotypes. Establishing verified methods of diagnosing clinically indolent and significant cases allows practitioners to provide more accurate care and therapeutic options that range from no therapy, preventative care to symptomatic relief. These diagnostic signatures also allow for a more accurate representation of test samples used in research. Similar to the procedure of validation of prognostic gene signature, a criterion exists for classifying a gene signature as a biomarker for a disorder or diseases outlined by Chau et al.

=== Predictive gene signatures ===
A predictive gene signature is similar to a predictive biomarker, where it predicts the effect of treatment in patients or study participants that exhibit a particular disease phenotype. A predictive gene signature unlike a prognostic gene signature can be a target for therapy. The information predictive signatures provide are more rigorous than that of prognostic signatures as they are based on treatment groups with therapeutic intervention on the likely benefit from treatment, completely independent of prognosis. Predictive gene signatures addresses the paramount need for ways to personalize and tailor therapeutic intervention in diseases. These signatures have implications in facilitating personalized medicine through identification of more novel therapeutic targets and identifying the most qualified subjects for optimal benefit of specific treatments.

== See also ==
- Genomic signature
- Mutational signatures
- Gene expression profiling
- Gene expression profiling in cancer
