= Intraocular schwannoma =

Type of eye tumor

Within medical ophthalmology, Intraocular schwannoma, also termed uveal schwannoma, is a type of schwannoma (homogeneous tumor) found in the eye. These tumors are almost always benign in nature and while malignant forms have been documented in other areas of the body, this has not been reported in the uveal region. Composed of Schwann cells, these masses are generally slow growing and can be found in the peripheral nerve tract, often around the head and neck.

== Signs and symptoms ==
There are several signs and symptoms of the eye that can indicate the growth of a tumor, which include:

- White or reddening pupil
- Eye enlargement or bulging
- Redness or irritation
- Visual disturbances
- Vision loss or changes
- Drooping eyelid.

== Mechanism ==
Schwann cells are glial cells that were originally discovered by Theodore Schwann, a co-founder of the cell theory, during the nineteenth century. These cells are now known to be involved in maintaining the peripheral nervous system (PNS) and can be subdivided into two types, myelinated and non-myelinated. These cells wrap around the axons of the PNS, and due to the nature of their plasticity, they are able to perform a variety of essential functions.

=== Function ===
The key function of Schwann cells is the myelination, or simply the insulation of axons. This fatty covering aids in the conduction of neuronal signals, allowing for efficient transmission. These cells also aid in the elimination of cellular debris, regeneration and upkeep of axons. Additionally, Schwann cells are actively involved in creating an inflammation reaction as a response to an injury of the PNS. Because injuries can lead to damaged axons, Schwann cells aid in fixing axonal damage and promoting new growth. Due to their healing properties, these cells can be used in spinal cord injuries to encourage regeneration of damaged axons. Finally, these multipurpose cells are key in the formation of protective outer barrier, or the perineurial sheath, that creates a vital separation for peripheral nerves.

=== Associated conditions ===
There are also several diseases linked to Schwann cells that ought to be noted. To begin with, some demylelinating disorders include: multiple sclerosis, Charcot-Marie-Tooth disease (CMT), and Guillain–Barré syndrome. Although science has yet to offer up conclusive evidence that Schwann cell transplantation is an effective treatment for demylelinating disorders, it is possible that this could be applied in clinical practice in the future. There are also two inherited tumor disorders that have been connected with Schwann cells, neurofibromatosis type 1 and type 2. While both are genetic conditions associated with benign tumors, neurofibromatosis type I are neurofibromas and are therefore composed of a variety of cells and elements including Schwann cells and mast cells among others. In contrast, neurofibromatosis type II is characterized by schwannomas located on the eighth cranial nerve. This unfortunate placement leads to disruptions in balance, hearing and sometimes even vision.

=== Description ===
While schwannomas in a general sense can be found in a variety of places where Schwann cells are located, intraocular schwannomas are a rare but serious condition that specifically targets the eye. These tumors are thought to come from Schwann cells of the ciliary nerves and have also been called "pseudomelanomas" and for good reason. They are given this name due to the fact that they often resemble a common and dangerous eye tumor, a uveal melanoma. This commonality can lead to misdiagnosis and the unnecessary enucleation of an eye as a result. Because of this confusion, schwannomas are most often diagnosed after removal. While it may be difficult if not impossible to make the distinction on the basis of routine examination and diagnostic measures, it is key to be aware of the possibility of intraocular schwannomas and look for any atypical features that may present themselves.

== Diagnosis ==
With the symptoms above in mind, practitioners would likely look for decreased vision and intraocular masses in making their diagnosis as these have been documented as the most common findings for intraocular schwannomas. Additionally, these tumors are most frequently found in the choroid, at 60%, as compared to the ciliary body (40%) and the iris (11%). Schwannomas generally present themselves as smooth, ovoid masses, lacking pigmentation. However, these tumors can also rarely be colored and lobulated. This overlap can lead to a uveal melanoma diagnosis, as these can be characteristics of both.

== Treatment ==
Intraocular schwannomas are treatable and there are several treatment options that may be considered, depending on the size and specific location of the tumor. For small tumors, caught early, observation can be initially used as long as good vision is maintained. However, in the study conducted by You et al. all of the patients whose tumors were initially observed needed further treatment and enucleation as their conditions declined. For tumors that are initially more aggressive, larger in size or suspected as cancerous, local resection and enucleation are also options. Radiation therapy, however, cannot be used in this instance as schwannomas are resistant to this treatment.

== Prognosis ==
The systemic and ocular prognosis for intraocular schwannoma is positive. While a patient may lose an eye, they are unlikely to encounter metastasized growth or life-threatening malignant change. Although follow-up data has shown the potential need for re-excision and side-effects, these issues are minor and the general outcome for patients is excellent.

== Epidemiology ==
A study by You et al. was only able to evaluate the 47 documented cases that have been made to date. According to this study, intraocular schwannomas are more prevalent in females as compared to males with a ratio of 3:1. Additionally, individuals are more likely to present with intraocular schwannomas at a younger age than with uveal melanomas, the most common intraocular tumor. According to the participants evaluated in this study, the average age of occurrence was 37 years old; the age range documented represented individuals 9–76 years old.
