= Choroidal nevus =

Choroidal Nevus
- Other names: eye nevus, eye freckle
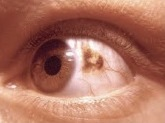
- A choroidal nevus on the sclera of the eye
- Specialty: Ophthalmology
- Causes: Unknown

Choroidal nevus (plural: nevi) is a type of eye neoplasm that is classified under choroidal tumors as a type of benign (non-cancerous) melanocytic tumor. A choroidal nevus can be described as an unambiguous pigmented blue or green-gray choroidal lesion, found at the front of the eye, around the iris, or the rear end of the eye.

Nevi are usually darkly pigmented tumors because they comprise melanocytes. J. Donald M. Gass, one of the leading specialists on eye diseases, speculated that a choroidal nevus grows from small cells resting as hyperplastic lesions, and exhibits growth primarily. In most cases, choroidal nevus is an asymptomatic disease, however, in serious conditions, adverse symptoms can be observed.

Choroidal nevus is usually diagnosed through an ophthalmic eye examination, or more specialized technologies such as photographic imaging, ophthalmoscopy, ultrasonography and ocular coherence tomography (OCT). Choroidal nevi can transform into a choroidal or ocular melanoma, becoming cancerous. Therefore, it is crucial to differentiate between a non-cancerous choroidal nevus and lethal melanoma.

== Forms of choroidal nevi ==
There are different ways to describe a choroidal nevus with its specific characteristics, such as halo choroidal nevus, giant choroidal nevus, and choroidal nevus with drusen. These characteristics and forms of nevi can and may overlap and be present at the same time.

=== Halo choroidal nevus ===
Halo choroidal nevus is described as a yellow halo around the darkly pigmented brown centre, or in other terms, a pigmented centre with a hypo-pigmented periphery. Halo nevi contribute to 5% of all choroidal nevi. The pathogenesis of the halo nevus is not known, but the presence of a halo around the choroidal nevus was statistically proven to have a relatively lower risk of transforming into melanoma and thus is a predictive factor for stability. A few indicators of a halo nevus include an absence of subretinal fluid and orange pigment, thickness level less than 2 mm, as well as the tumor margin being remote from the optic disk.

=== Giant choroidal nevus ===
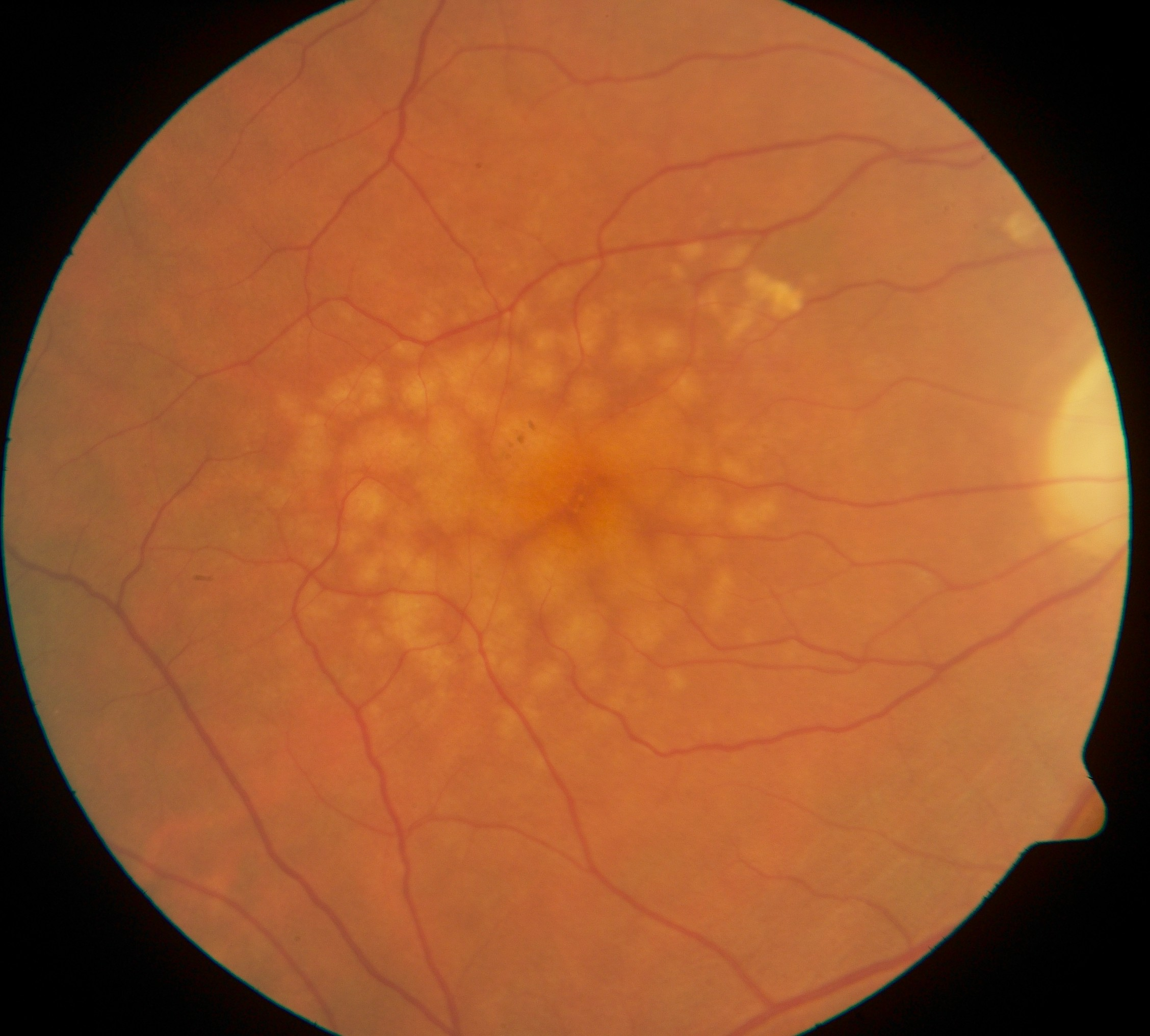
Fundus photograph of a soft drusen

Giant choroidal nevus is described as one that has a basal diameter larger than 10mm. This variant contributes to 8% of all choroidal nevi. Due to its large basal diameter and thickness, it can be easily mistaken and diagnosed as choroidal melanoma. However, it does have the potential to grow into a melanoma. One study reported that over a period of 10 years, 18% of giant nevi grew into melanomas. Some of the most common features observed among these transformed giant nevi are nearness to the foveola and ultrasonographic acoustic hollowness, suggesting that these may be the reasons for the transformation into melanomas. Thus, patients with giant nevus require close monitoring.

=== Choroidal nevus with drusen ===
Choroidal nevus with drusen can be considered as a sign of chronicity since drusen take years to develop and appear. Drusen are composed of lipids and can actually be an indicator that a tumour is a benign nevus as opposed to a cancerous melanoma. In nevi imaged by OCT, about 41% are found to have drusen.

== Signs and symptoms ==
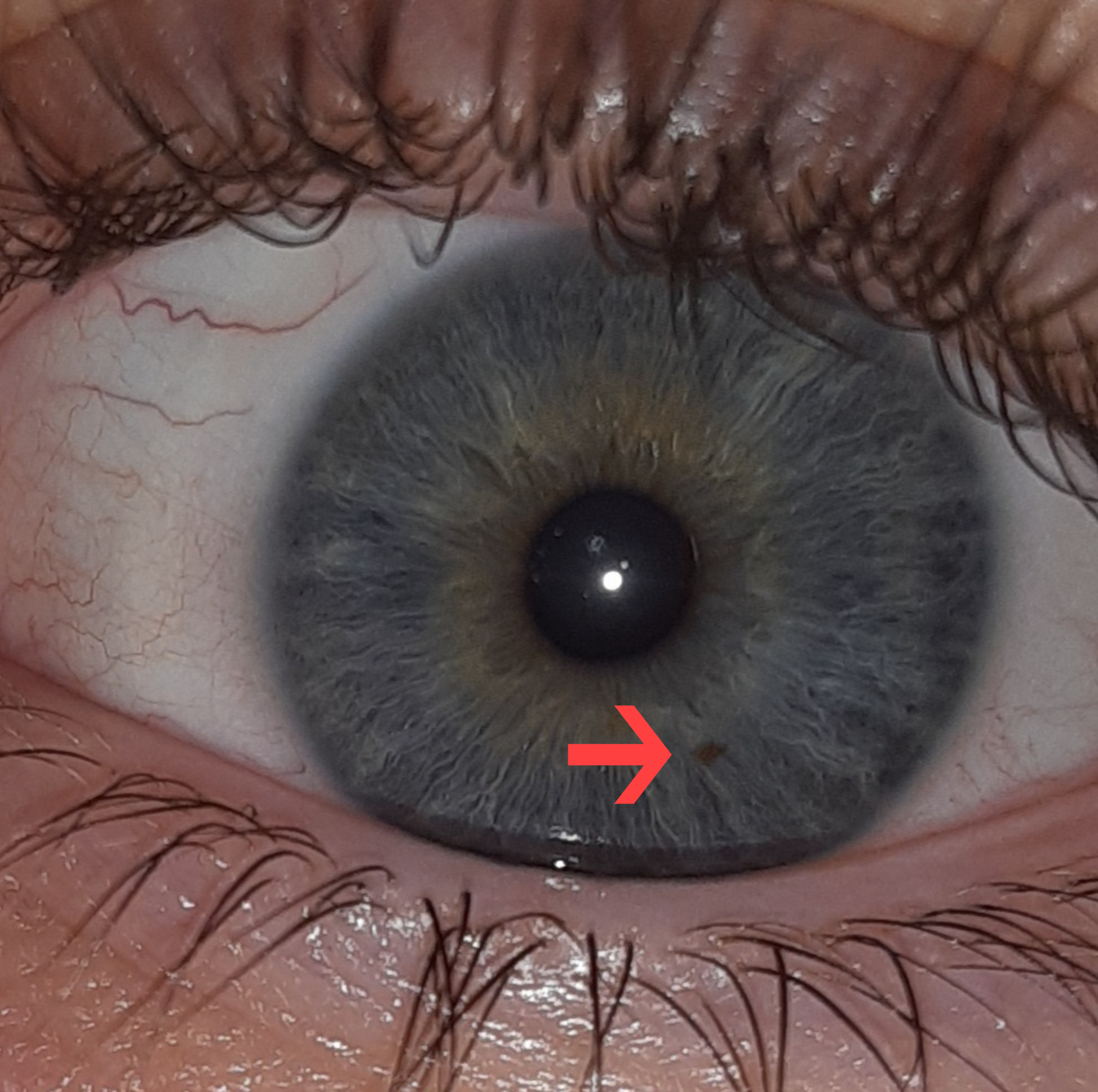
A choroidal nevus on the iris

Location of the nevi plays a role in determining whether the disease is associated with any symptoms. In unusual circumstances, when the nevus is located below the center of the retina, blurred vision is the result. When a choroidal nevus becomes severe, it can cause leakage of fluid and abnormal development of vascular tissue (neovascularization). This leads to retinal detachment in that part of the eye, which is observed as some loss of vision or flashing lights. Additionally, if the nevus is present for an extended period of time (years), and hinders the removal of retinal waste products, this can result in the development of yellowish white specks and spots on the surface of the nevi, called drusen.

== Cause ==
Currently, the cause of choroidal nevus is unknown.

== Transformation of a nevus into melanoma ==
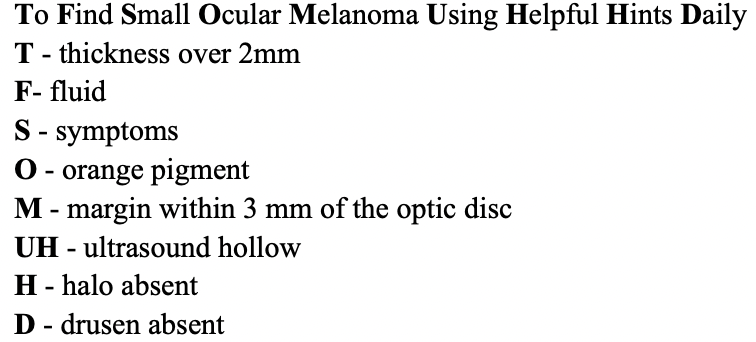
Mnemonic to help differentiate between melanomas and nevi

Naturally, nevi occur more frequently than melanoma. Research shows that only about 1 in 9000 (in the United States population) transform into melanomas. Patients are at particularly high risk if the following is observed:

- A tumor thickness greater than 2mm or a tumor two times or more larger than the optic nerve head.
- Symptoms such as decreased vision (lower acuity), flashing lights and orange pigment on or surrounding the tumor.
- Distance between the margin of the tumor and the optic disk is less than 3mm.
- Subretinal fluid (i.e. the leakage of fluid).
- Ultrasonographic hollowness. In one study, 25% of nevi with hollowness on ultrasonography transformed into melanoma.
- Lack of halo. The presence of a halo is associated with stability of the nevi. This is illustrated by a study which reported that 7% of nevi in the absence of halo, grew into melanoma.

If three or more of the above melanoma risk factors are observed, the risk of the choroidal nevus growing into a melanoma is greater than 50%.

=== Pathophysiology and cytogenetics ===
The pathophysiology of choroidal melanoma (a type of uveal melanoma), is not well understood. However, several molecular mechanisms and cytogenetics may be involved in the process of it becoming malignant. Chromosomal alterations, monosomy 3 and chromosome 8 gains have been identified to be associated with metastasis in uveal melanomas. Moreover BAP1, GNAQ, GNA11, SF3B1 and EIF1AX gene alterations were shown to be in correlation with uveal melanomas, each with a frequency of 18–45%.

=== Other risk factors ===
Although transformation into a melanoma is considered to be sporadic, several general risk factors are identified to be potentially relevant to the malignant transformation. These include light iris color, generally lower levels of melanin (light and untanned skin tones), exposure to arc welding due to intermittent ultraviolet exposure, as well as diseases such as ocular melanocytosis and dysplastic nevus syndrome.

=== Differentiating between choroidal nevi and melanomas ===
Choroidal nevus has a few features that differentiate it from a choroidal melanoma, its malignant tumor form. Speed of growth: Nevi with slow growth in terms of size and in the absence of melanoma risk factors, do not show any signs of malignancy. The process of enlargement of the nevus can take up to an average of 15 years. In a long-term follow up study on the growth of choroidal nevi, out of 284 nevi, 31% of the patients only showed slight enlargement of choroidal nevi without any clinical evidence or signs of transformation into melanoma. In contrast, for small melanomas, the speed of growth is much faster, making it easily detectable in a short period of time. In fact, melanomas grow exponentially in thickness during their active growth phase.

Ability to metastasis: Choroidal melanomas are able to undergo distant metastasis, whereas choroidal nevus is unable to do so.

Risks factors for prediction of growth: There is a lack of overlap between the risk factors for the prediction of growth or enlargement of nevus and melanoma. While choroidal melanomas have multiple risk factors including even UV exposure and welding, the only risk factor for choroidal nevus is age. Slow growth and enlargement of choroidal nevi are found to be more common in younger patients, before becoming stable in mid or late adulthood.

== Diagnosis ==
Unless the choroidal nevus has progressed to a symptomatic form, it can only be discovered during a normal eye examination. The nevus is identified by its distinctive appearance. With a thickness of approximately 2mm and a color between brown to slate gray, the edge of the nevus blends into the retina. It is entirely possible to have more than one nevus in an eye, or have nevi in both eyes.

Diagnostic testing is carried out by ultrasound, fluorescein angiography and OCT. Both OCT and ultrasound fall under ophthalmic diagnostic imaging, allowing practitioners to take direct photographs of eye surfaces. The retinal pigment epithelium (RPE) can be captured as well, using autofluorescence, because the light waves can detect lipofuscin.

A B-scan ultrasound provides the practitioner with an approximate size of the tumor, in addition to vertical and horizontal measurements, while an A-scan determines the amount of internal reflectivity. On the other hand, fluorescein angiography will aid in recognizing whether the tumor has developed its own circulation network.

Optomap is a common diagnostic tool in recognizing a choroidal nevus from a melanoma. It takes an image of the nevus or melanoma using two different lasers - which are red and green. When using the green laser to view the retina, a nevus would be invisible while a melanoma would be visible. Hence, optomap can distinguish a nevus from a melanoma.

Artificial Intelligence (AI) may have the potential for clinical diagnosis of choroidal nevus or melanoma. This can be achieved through machine learning, whereby a large dataset of imaging photographs of all sizes, shapes and location of nevi are used in training. This would improve detection accuracy as well as the design of treatment for nevi and melanoma.

== Treatment ==
Since typical choroidal nevi do not have adverse effects, treatment is not required. Additionally, there are no safe methods to remove nevi from the eye as of now. Nonetheless, annual evaluations and checkups by ophthalmologists are necessary. The American Academy of Ophthalmology recommends adults aged 40 and above to have full eye examinations, as vision loss and eye diseases are most likely to start around this age.

Most choroidal nevi can be managed and monitored by OCT. However, the abnormal development of vascular tissue as a result of the development of nevi can be treated using anti-VEGF agents, injected through the veins. These drugs inactivate the growth factor (VEGF) to reduce neovascularization and swelling. If the choroidal nevus does transform into a melanoma, then it would be treated with cancer therapy.

== Prevalence ==
The prevalence of choroidal nevus among the United States adult population above 40 years old is 4.7%. In terms of ethnicity, a cohort study done in the United States reported that the prevalence of choroidal nevus was found more in whites (4.1%) than in Chinese (0.4%), blacks (0.7%) and Hispanics (1.2%). However, the difference between Chinese, blacks and Hispanics was not statistically significant. The prevalence of choroidal nevus did not vary between sex, but it did vary with age. The incidence of nevi was discovered to be highest in people between the ages of 55 and 74 and lowest in people aged between 75 and 84. Hence, it is likely that there is a higher prevalence of the disease in people who are comparatively younger.

Another study on the prevalence of choroidal nevus among the female population investigated the role of obesity and reproductive factors in the development of the disease. Among premenopausal women, the risk of developing nevus is shown to be four times higher in those who had their first child before 25, compared to those who had their first child after 35. Moreover, among postmenopausal females, the prevalence in obese females was twice that of non-obese females.

== See also ==
- Uveal Melanoma
- Prognosis for Choroidal Melanoma
- List of eye diseases
