= Hemmel Amrania =

Scientist

- Citizenship: England
- Education: PhD: Imperial College London
- Scientific career
- Institutions: Imperial College London

Hemmel Amrania is a UK-based scientist and former research fellow at Imperial College London.

== Career ==
His current research centers on the development biomarkers in cancer and digital pathology assisted with spectroscopy. He holds an M.Sc. from Imperial College London and a postgraduate MPhil (diplôme d'étude approfondie) from École supérieure d'optique, Paris where he also worked at the CNRS in Orsay before moving back to Imperial College to pursue his PhD. During his doctoral studies he worked with Sir Nicholas Wright OBE at the Cancer Research UK Labs investigating the detection of cancer biomarkers using spectroscopy notably without the use of reagents. Later he worked at the Charing Cross Hospital medical oncology unit under Charles Coombes (oncologist) and Sami Shousha (pathologist) investigating prognostic markers for the guidance of adjuvant therapy in early stage breast cancer patients. Subsequently, as a research fellow at Imperial College London he spent time at the University of Oxford Synchrotron facility to explore single cancer cell imaging. After his academic career he later founded Digistain, a spin-out technology from Imperial College praised for its ability to streamline therapy decisions in early breast cancer eliminating the need for the costly shipment of biopsies to centralized laboratories for analysis as per the current standard of care.

For his developmental work on Digistain he was awarded the Royal Society Innovation Prize, a Cancer Research UK Pioneer Award and an Innovate UK SMART award.

== Awards ==
- Outstanding Research Prize at Imperial College London
- Innovation & Entrepreneurship Challenge Imperial College and the Climate KIC Competition held by the Mayor of London
- Award for solving treatment delays in breast cancer
- Royal Society Innovation Prize
- Cancer Research UK Pioneer Award
- Innovate UK SMART Award
- Medilink Midlands Finalist
- Institute of Physics Innovation Award
