= Metaphocyte =

Myleoid-like cells in zebrafish

Metaphocytes are myeloid-like cells considered among tissue-resident macrophages (TRMs) and are present in the skin, gill, and intestine of the zebrafish (Danio rerio). Originating from the ectoderm during development, metaphocytes share many similarities, in terms of cellular morphology and gene expression profile with macrophages (which are of mesodermal origin) in particular the Langerhans cells in the skin.

== Function ==
Similar to many immune cells, metaphocytes are highly motile cells found in mucosal tissues such as skin, gills, and intestines. Interestingly, by contrast to conventional macrophages, metaphocytes do not migrate or respond to wound-induced inflammation, and they lack phagocytosis ability. The main function of the metaphocytes is to uptake soluble antigens from the external environment and to transfer these antigens to Langerhans cells (TRM of the skin), most probably to regulate the immune response.
