= Frederick Walker (pathologist) =

British pathologist

Professor Frederick Walker
- Born: 21 December 1934; Castle Douglas, Dumfriesshire, Scotland
- Died: 31 July 2017 (aged 82); Edinburgh, Scotland
- Spouses: Cathleen (divorced); Jean W. Keeling (m. 1998)
- Children: 2

Academic background
- Education: University of Glasgow

Frederick Walker (21 December 1934 – 31 July 2017), commonly known as Eric, was a British pathologist who served as the Regius Professor of Pathology at the University of Aberdeen from 1984 to 2000.

== Career ==
Walker was born in Castle Douglas, Dumfriesshire in 1934, and attended Kirkcudbright Academy. He graduated from the University of Glasgow in 1959, where he also began his academic career. He moved to Aberdeen as a senior lecturer in 1968, under Alastair Currie. In 1973, Walker was appointed foundation Professor of Pathology at the University of Leicester.

In 1984, Walker was appointed Regius Professor of Pathology at the University of Aberdeen, a position he held until his retirement in 2000, when he was made Emeritus. His research focused on the immunobiology of connective tissue stroma, bridging histopathology and biochemistry. He was also a consultant pathologist at the Grampian Health Board, also between 1984 and 2000. In 1999, he was credited on a paper with Graeme Murray, who would later become Regius Professor of Pathology himself in 2019.

Walker served as General Secretary and Chairman of the Pathological Society of Great Britain and Ireland from 1992 to 2000. During his tenure, he transferred the publishing of The Journal of Pathology to Wiley, where he also wrote papers. He also negotiated the separation of Pathology and Microbiology, and created the role of president to succeed the role of chairman.

== Personal life ==
Walker was married twice, first to Cathleen, with whom he had two daughters, however they later divorced. He then married Jean Keeling, a paediatric pathologist (who also had two children from her first marriage), in 1998. He died of pulmonary carcinoma on 31 July 2017 in Edinburgh at the age of 82, with Jean surviving him.
