= Ciliary body melanoma =

Type of eye cancer

Ciliary body melanoma is a type of cancer arising from the coloured part (uvea) of the eye.

About 12% of uveal melanoma arise from the ciliary body.

== Clinical features ==
It occurs most commonly in the sixth decade of life.

- External signs include dilated episcleral blood vessels (sentinel vessels). Extraocular erosion may produce a dark mass beneath the conjunctiva.
- Pressure on the lens by the enlarging tumor can cause astigmatism, subluxation of the lens and formation of a localised lens opacity.
- The tumor can erode forward through the iris root and mimic an iris melanoma.
- Retinal detachment can be rarely caused by posterior extension of the tumor.
- Anterior uveitis is an uncommon presentation and occurs due to tumor necrosis.
- Cirumferentially growing tumors carry a bad prognosis as they are diagnosed late.
- At times the tumor is detected as an incidental finding during routine examination.

The tumour is usually diagnosed by clinical examination with a slit-lamp utilising a triple mirror contact lens. Ultrasonography and fine-needle aspiration biopsy (FNAB) are also sometimes helpful in confirming the diagnosis.

== Treatment ==
Enucleation (surgical removal of the eye) is the treatment of choice for large ciliary body melanomas. Small or medium-sized tumors may be treated by an iridocyclectomy. Radiotherapy may be appropriate in selected cases.

== See also ==
- Ocular oncology
- Uveal melanoma – melanoma of the eye
