= Sarah Coupland =

Australian clinical pathologist

Professor Sarah Coupland

Sarah Coupland is an Australian-born pathologist and professor who is the George Holt Chair in Pathology at the University of Liverpool. Coupland is an active clinical scientist whose research focuses on the molecular genetics of cancers, with particular interests in uveal melanoma, conjunctival melanoma, intraocular and ocular adnexal lymphomas and CNS lymphoma. Coupland is also an NHS Honorary Consultant Histopathologist at the Royal Liverpool University Hospital. Since 2006, Coupland has been head of the Liverpool Ocular Oncology Research Group; from which she runs a multidisciplinary oncology research group focussing on Uveal melanoma, based in the Department of Molecular and Clinical Cancer Medicine at the University of Liverpool. Her research laboratory is currently located in the Institute of Translational Medicine From April 2014 to December 2019, Coupland was also Director of the North West Cancer Research Centre, @UoL. In both 2019 and 2020, Coupland was included on the 'Pathology Powerlist' on The Pathologist website.

== Education ==
Coupland was born in Sydney, raised in Canberra and was educated at the University of New South Wales, Australia, where she received her MBBS Bachelor of Medicine, Bachelor of Surgery clinical degree in 1988, after which she studied for a Ph.D. at the University of Sydney. For most of her career, Coupland has been based in Europe, and since 2005, she has been an academic research-based clinician at the University of Liverpool.

Following the completion of her Ph.D. studies, Coupland moved to Germany to continue her specialist pathology training at the Charité University Hospital Benjamin Franklin, FU Berlin between 1995 – 2002, obtaining a Klein Sprachdiplom from the Goethe Institute, Berlin in 1994, and completing her Facharzt ('specialist') examinations in Surgical Histopathology in 2002 at the Free University of Berlin, from where she was also awarded a Habilitation degree in Surgical Histopathology (Assoc. Professor thesis) in 2005. She was then made Consultant Pathologist at the Charité University Hospital Benjamin Franklin, Berlin from 2002–2005. In 2005, she has registered by the General Medical Council, a public body that maintains the official register of medical practitioners within the United Kingdom. She re-registered in 2015 and as a Liverpool-based pathologist was Director of the Liverpool Tissue Bank between 2011 – 2016 and a contributor to the Athena SWAN agenda as Deputy Lead for the Institute of Translational medicine at the University of Liverpool.

== Research ==
Coupland is an active research collaborator and has received significant funding, both as both a principal investigator and as a co-investigator. Recent funding, with the support of Innovate UK includes the creation of a Northern (N6) Academic Pathology Network Digital Pathology (2019-2021), funding from North West Cancer Research to characterise the tumour- immune microenvironment in metastatic uveal melanoma (2018-2020), a once renewed NWCR Programme Grant (2014-2021) that funds prestigious NWCR prize DTP PhD studentships. Coupland has also received competitive research funding from EU-based Horizon 2020, Fight for Sight, NIHR and MRC schemes, totalling some £3.5million as PI and £14.5 million as Co-I.

In addition to her research activities, she has contributed to numerous international meetings, giving international keynote lectures. She dedicates much of her career to service within her field, including roles as Vice-Chair of the ‘Ophthalmic Tumor Writing Group’, 7th & 8th Ed’ns AJCC/TNM Classification (since 2005), as a member of the International Society of Ophthalmic Pathology (and President from 2011–present), a member for the Association for Research in Vision and Ophthalmology (ARVO) (and Vice-President between 2017-2018), and she has been a trustee of ARVO Anatomy-Pathology-Oncology group & an ARVO Board Member (2013 - 2018). Coupland was also Chair of the ‘Ophthalmic Pathology Working Group’ of the European Society of Pathology (2013- 2018), the European Society of Medical Oncology (ESMO), where she was Pathology rep on the “Clinical Trials Committee” (>2015–present). She has also served on the Mucosal Melanoma Guidelines Writing group (2016-2018), the ACCEA Merseyside Regional Committee for National Awards (>2011–present), the National Cancer Research Institute CM-Path Workstream 4 – Molecular technologies, Digital Pathology (>2016–present). She is an elected committee member of the Pathological Society of Great Britain and Ireland and served on the Education & Training Subcommittee (2016-2019. She was a Committee Member of the WHO Eye Tumour Writing Group (2016-2018). She was a member of the European Ophthalmic Oncology Group (and Secretary between 2008–2011, and President (between 2011-2014). Coupland is an active patient advocate, and part of the OcuMelUK patient support group and the National Cancer Research Institute Lymphoma Biological Studies Subgroup (Chair from 2008-2011). In terms of scientific publishing and scholarship, she has been a member of the Editorial Board of the journal Investigative Ophthalmology & Visual Science since 2016, an Associate Editor for Acta Ophthalmologica (since 2014), and was an Associate Editor (pathology) for Graefe's Archives for Clinical and Experimental Ophthalmology. She was a Reviewing Editor of “Ocular Immunology and Inflammation” (between 2013-2018) and an Editorial Board Member of BMC Cancer (between 2010 and 2018).

== Awards ==
As well as serving on multiple committees and charities, especially in the broader field of ocular diseases, Coupland is a decorated clinical pathologist, and in recognition of her science, she has received numerous awards. Her most recent prizes include an ARVO Silver Fellow Award (2012), an ARVO Gold Fellow Award (2014/5) and a prestigious ARVO Distinguished Service Award (2018). In 2018, she received the International Council of Ophthalmology Eye Pathology Award – 2018 and most recently, in 2019, a Royal College of Pathology Excellence Award in the Subspecialty of Ophthalmic Pathology and Oncology. The citation reads 'Professor Coupland is an outstanding pre-eminent ocular pathologist in the UK and is internationally acclaimed for her work in ocular oncology. She has been instrumental to the care delivered to the world-recognised ocular oncology service in Liverpool through her pathology work, development of molecular and tumour signatures of ocular tumours, providing the evidence that informs treatments, prognosis and optimal patient care'. In further recognition of her work and achievements, Coupland was included on the Pathologist Power List for 2019

Coupland has given over 150 invited seminars at universities across the world, and she is credited with the supervision of dozens of Masters and PhD students, in addition to serving as a Pathology International Training Fellowship supervisor for over 20 students. Coupland has also acted as an external PhD examiner at over 20 European and UK universities.

== Publications ==
She has published over 280 peer-reviewed publications, with an h-index of 47 (as of 2020) and a total of over 7,000 citations, according to Scopus or >10,600 according to Google Scholar. Highly cited papers include a large number of enduring important first author and corresponding author publications, and citation classics such as and Coupland also contributed to important high-impact studies of genotyping in choroidal uveal melanoma and clinical subtying in uveal melanoma. With colleagues, she has recently reviewed the field of targeted therapy for uveal melanoma, where she discusses cautious optimism for the treatment of patients with new types of targeted, and perhaps patient-specific, therapeutics
