= J. William Harbour =

American ophthalmologist and researcher

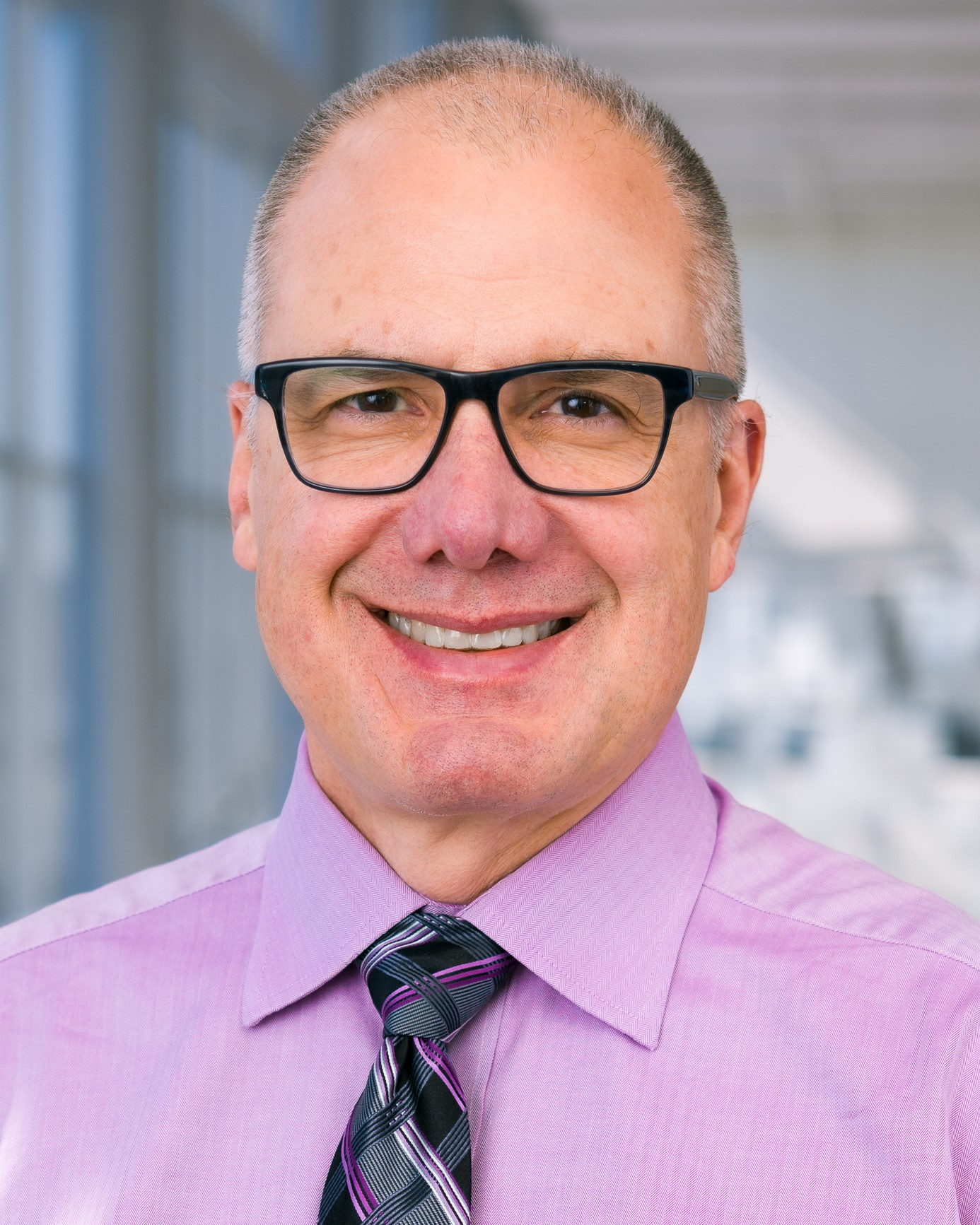
- Harbour in 2022
- Born: June 27, 1963 (age 63)
- Education: Texas A&M University; Johns Hopkins University
- Awards: Cogan Award, Association for Research in Vision and Ophthalmology; Paul Henkind Memorial Award, Macula Society
- Scientific career
- Fields: Ocular oncology, Cancer research
- Workplaces: UT Southwestern Medical Center; Bascom Palmer Eye Institute; University of Miami; Washington University in St. Louis

J. William Harbour is an American ophthalmologist, ocular oncologist and cancer researcher. He is Chair of the Department of Ophthalmology at the University of Texas Southwestern Medical Center in Dallas. He previously served as the vice chair and director of ocular oncology at the Bascom Palmer Eye Institute and associate director for basic science at the Sylvester Comprehensive Cancer Center of the University of Miami's Miller School of Medicine.

Harbour's clinical practice focuses on intraocular tumors, including uveal (ocular) melanoma, retinoblastoma, lymphoma and other neoplasms. His field of research includes the genetics and genomics of cancer, with a focus on prognostic biomarkers, mechanisms of metastasis, and molecular targeted therapies. He has given over 300 scientific lectures, and published over 200 articles and book chapters. Harbour founded the Ocular Oncology Service at the Washington University School of Medicine in St. Louis, where he was the Paul A. Cibis Distinguished Professor of Ophthalmology & Visual Sciences.

== Early life and education ==
Harbour is a native of Dallas, Texas. He graduated from Hillcrest High School and earned his undergraduate degree in biochemistry at Texas A&M University. Harbour then attended medical school at Johns Hopkins University School of Medicine, where he developed an interest in cancer biology. He completed medical school in 1990, followed by ophthalmology residency at the Wills Eye Hospital, a clinical fellowship in vitreoretinal diseases and surgery at the Bascom Palmer Eye Institute, and ocular oncology fellowship at the University of California, San Francisco.

== Career ==
Harbour accepted a position as assistant professor at Washington University in St. Louis, where he remained for 16 years and rose through the ranks to the title of Paul A. Cibis Distinguished Professor of Ophthalmology, professor of medicine and professor of cell biology and physiology. In 2012, he was recruited to the Bascom Palmer Eye Institute and Sylvester Comprehensive Cancer Center at the University of Miami as professor of ophthalmology, biochemistry, and molecular biology. He served as vice chair for translational research, medical director of the echography and clinical research units, and director of ocular oncology at Bascom Palmer, and associate director for basic research at Sylvester. He established the Bascom Palmer ocular oncology fellowship program and served as the fellowship director. In 2021, Harbour assumed the chairmanship of the Department of Ophthalmology at the University of Texas Southwestern Medical Center, where he continues to practice ocular oncology.

== Research ==
Harbour developed an interest in research during his undergraduate years at Texas A&M, where he studied the function of the copper protein ceruloplasmin in the laboratory of Edward Harris. During medical school, he was accepted to the Howard Hughes Medical Institute–National Institutes of Health (HHMI–NIH) Research Scholars Program in Bethesda, MD, where he carried out research in the National Cancer Institute laboratory of John Minna. This research resulted in a breakthrough discovery published in the journal Science in 1988, with Harbour as first author. Previously it had been thought that mutations in the retinoblastoma gene, the first tumor suppressor gene to be discovered, would be limited to the rare eye cancer retinoblastoma. However, Harbour and co-authors showed that the gene was commonly mutated in a common form of lung cancer. This discovery added to increasing recognition of the retinoblastoma tumor suppressor pathway as a common target of mutation in the vast majority of human cancers.

When Harbour joined Washington University in 1996, he undertook a three-year postdoctoral research training program in molecular oncology, which resulted in a publication in the journal Cell showing that the retinoblastoma protein is regulated by successive phosphorylation events. This discovery was subsequently corroborated by protein crystallography and other lines of investigation and has helped to explain how some cancer cells inactivate the retinoblastoma protein by phosphorylation rather than mutation.

In the early 2000s, the focus of Harbour's research turned to uveal melanoma, in which he discovered a gene expression profile that predicted which of these cancers would remain localized to the eye (class 1 profile) and which would metastasize (class 2 profile). Based on this discovery, his group developed a clinical prognostic test with high technical performance and prognostic accuracy. The study also demonstrated the prognostic superiority of the gene expression profile test over traditional clinical features used in the TNM classification, as well as chromosome 3 status, neither of which provided prognostic information that was independent of the gene expression profile test. Subsequently, the test has been the subject of a story in The New York Times, and it has been licensed to Castle Biosciences, Inc. which provides the test for clinical use under the trade name DecisionDx-UM.

In 2010, Harbour was first author on a paper in the journal Science describing frequent mutations in the tumor suppressor gene BAP1 in uveal melanoma. These mutations were strongly associated with metastasis, thereby opening a new avenue of research into the cause of metastasis in this cancer.

In 2012, the Harbour lab discovered that the histone deacetylase inhibitors may be repurposed to also treat uveal melanoma by reversing the high risk class 2 profile. Subsequently, this discovery has formed the basis for a clinical trial at Bascom Palmer Eye Institute and Sylvester Comprehensive Cancer Center to assess the use of the histone deacetylase inhibitor Vorinostat in patients with high risk uveal melanoma.

In 2013, Harbour was first author on another paper in Nature Genetics describing frequent mutations in the splicing factor SF3B1 in uveal melanoma. Unlike BAP1, mutations in SF3B1 were associated with better clinical outcome.

In 2016, the Harbour lab discovered that the cancer-testis antigen PRAME is another prognostic biomarker in uveal melanoma. Both class 1 and class 2 uveal melanomas expressing PRAME were shown to have a worse prognosis, but these tumors may also be subject to immunotherapy directed against PRAME.

In 2018, the Harbour lab reported the largest number of uveal melanomas analyzed with next generation sequencing. In this report in Nature Communications, they created a customized bioinformatic pipeline that detected twice as many BAP1 mutations than previous methods, they discovered new driver mutations in the splicing factors SF3A1, SRSF2, SRSF7 and RBM10, and they used new clonality algorithms to reveal that all of the canonical genomic aberrations in uveal melanoma occur relatively early in tumor evolution.

In 2020, the Harbour lab was the first to publish single-cell sequencing data in uveal melanoma, showing previously unrecognized evolutionary and microenvironmental complexity in primary and metastatic tumors. They also discovered LAG3 as the predominant checkpoint molecule in this cancer, opening up new possibilities for immunotherapy in patients with uveal melanoma.

Harbour was awarded a $2.5 million grant from the NCI (National Cancer Institute) entitled "Molecular Predictive Testing in Uveal Melanoma," which will involve approximately 30 centers in the U.S. and Canada, with about half of the patients diagnosed annually with ocular melanoma in the U.S. expected to be enrolled.

=== Awards and recognition ===
In 2005, Harbour received the Cogan Award from the Association for Research in Vision and Ophthalmology (ARVO), recognizing the most promising young researcher in vision science. In 2008, he received the Young Investigator Award from the Macula Society for an "individual under 50 years of age whose work gives high promise of a notable advance in the clinical treatment of disorders of the eye." In 2013, he received the Florida Society of Ophthalmology Shaler Richardson, MD Service to Medicine Award for "personal contribution to quality patient care by collaborating and integrating ophthalmology into the medical profession on a national level." In 2014, he received the Paul Henkind Memorial Award from the Macula Society for outstanding retinal research. In 2015, he received the Paul Kayser/Retina Research Foundation Global Award -- Pan American Association of Ophthalmology (PAAO) for "breakthroughs in genetic and genomic research." In 2025, the St. Louis Society for the Blind and Visually Impaired honored Harbour with the Leslie Dana Gold Medal for his "commendable service" in ophthalmic clinical care and research.
