= Genomic signature =

The genomic signature refers to the characteristic frequency of oligonucleotides in a genome or sequence. It has been observed that the genomic signature of phylogenetically related genomes is similar.

== See also ==
- Gene signature
- mutational signatures
- Alignment-free sequence analysis
- Bioinformatics
- Computational genomics
- K-mer
- Phylogenomics
