= Intraocular lymphoma =

Form of eye cancer

Intraocular lymphoma is a rare malignant form of eye cancer. Intraocular lymphoma may affect the eye secondarily from a metastasis from a non-ocular tumor or may arise within the eye primarily (primary intraocular lymphoma, PIOL). PIOL is a subset of primary central nervous system lymphoma (PCNSL). PCNSL (and PIOL) are most commonly a diffuse large B-cell immunohistologic subtype of non-Hodgkin's lymphoma according to the World Health Organization (WHO) classification of lymphomas. The most common symptoms of PIOL include blurred or decreased vision due to tumor cells in the vitreous. Most cases of PIOL eventuate to central nervous system involvement (PCNSL) while only 20% of PCNSL lead to intraocular (PIOL) involvement. PIOL and PCNSL remain enigmas because both structures are immunologically privileged sites (the brain sits behind the blood–brain barrier and the retina sits behind the blood-retinal barrier) and so do not normally have immune cells trafficking through these structures. What is more, while the vast majority of PCNSL in patients with acquired immune deficiency syndrome (AIDS) is related to the Epstein-Barr virus (EBV), the development of PCNSL and PIOL in immunocompetent patients is unknown and shows no general relation to infectious DNAs.

PIOL affects the sub-retinal pigment epithelium (RPE), can invade into the retina, the vitreous, and the optic nerve. Ophthalmoscopy frequently reveals creamy yellow-to-orange colored subretinal infiltrates. Fluorescein angiography may reveal "leopard spot" patterns due to sub-RPE infiltrates that stain early and progressively or mottling of the RPE due to hyper- and hypofluorescent window defects.

PIOL is known as a masquerade syndrome because it frequently simulates the signs and symptoms of uveitis. As such, PIOL is frequently treated with corticosteroids. Occasionally, PIOL has mimicked a retinitis and has been treated with antiviral medication. It is not until the supposed uveitis fails to respond to treatment, becomes recalcitrant to treatment, or shows worsening with discontinuation of corticosteroid treatment that another cause is sought out. If PIOL is suspected, it is important to first obtain a magnetic resonance image (MRI) of the brain to rule out cerebral involvement (PCNSL). If MRI is negative, lumbar puncture with cerebrospinal fluid (CSF) cytology should be performed to further rule out CNS disease. Histopathologic identification of atypical lymphocytes is considered the gold standard for diagnosing PCNSL/PIOL. If CSF cytology is negative or inconclusive and PIOL is suspected, a vitrectomy is often performed with cytologic analysis. Furthermore, adjunctive testing including polymerase chain reaction (PCR) amplification to identify monoclonal rearrangements of the immunoglobulin heavy chain (IgH) gene (for B-cell lymphomas) or T-cell receptor (TCR, for the very rare T-cell lymphomas) can be performed. Analysis of vitreous humor or aqueous humor for the P265P mutation of MYD88 is especially helpful as that mutation is found in about 80-90% of cases.

Previously, radiation therapy was the mainstay treatment for PCNSL/PIOL, but methotrexate has now become first-line.
