= The Journal of Pathology =

- Discipline: Pathology
- Language: English
- Edited by: C Simon Herrington

Publication details
- Former names: The Journal of Pathology and Bacteriology
- History: 1892–present
- Publisher: John Wiley & Sons
- Frequency: Monthly
- Open access: Immediate upon payment of OnlineOpen fee; after 12-months NIH funded; after six months HHMI funded
- Impact factor: 7.996 (2020)

Standard abbreviations
- ISO 4: J. Pathol.

Indexing
- CODEN: JPTLAS
- ISSN: 0022-3417 (print); 1096-9896 (web)
- LCCN: sn80001300
- OCLC no.: 01754718

Links
- Journal homepage

The Journal of Pathology is a peer-reviewed medical journal that was established in 1892 as The Journal of Pathology and Bacteriology by German Sims Woodhead. It has been the official journal of the Pathological Society of Great Britain and Ireland (present name: Pathological Society) since its foundation in 1906. The journal has published important papers in pathology and experimental medicine including work by Rudolf Virchow and Ilya Ilyich Mechnikov, both of whom contributed to the inaugural issue. In 1969, the journal's title was shortened to The Journal of Pathology. In January 1999, the first of an ongoing series of Annual Review issues was published, on the topic of "Molecular and Cellular Themes in Cancer Research", edited by Peter A. Hall and David P. Lane. A history of the journal was written in 2006 by former editor-in-chief C. Simon Herrington, as a chapter of a book on the history of the Pathological Society.

The journal publishes research papers, reviews, commentaries, and perspectives, as well as the abstracts of the Pathological Society Winter and Summer Meetings (in two separate online-only yearly supplements). The current editor in chief is Peter A. Hall MD PhD. The journal is published on behalf of the Pathological Society by John Wiley & Sons. Because of the success of the Journal, in mid 2014 a companion journal was launched with a more clinical focus. This was initially called The Clinical Journal of Pathology but was then renamed Journal of Pathology: Clinical Research. Peter A. Hall was the initial editor of this companion journal.

Peter Hall stood down as the Editor in Chief in late 2014 after 7 years.
