= Pathological Society =

Professional organisation

Pathological Society of Great Britain and Ireland
- Founded: 1906; 120 years ago
- Legal status: charity
- General Secretary: Mark J Arends
- President: Sarah Coupland
- Website: https://www.pathsoc.org/

The Pathological Society is a professional organisation of Great Britain and Ireland whose mission is stated as 'understanding disease'.

== History ==
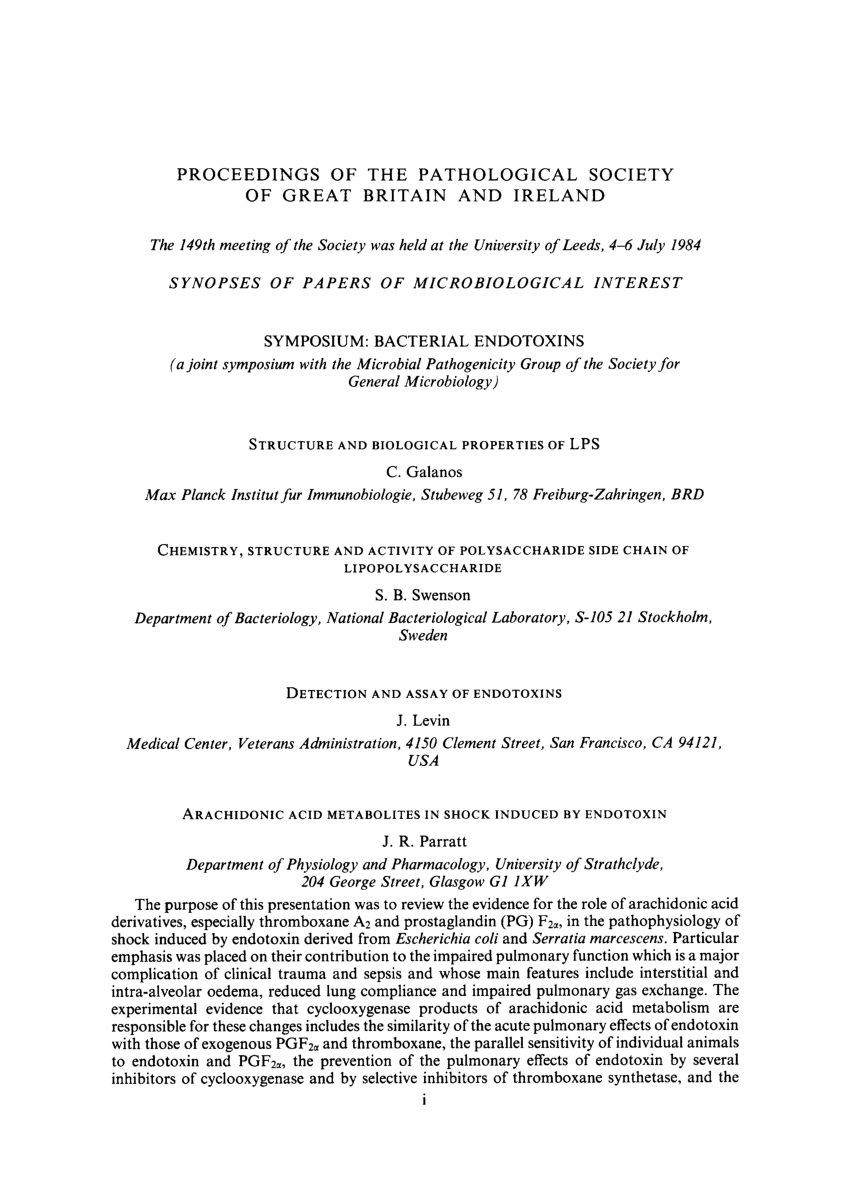
Pathological Society of Great Britain and Ireland monograph

The Pathological Society of Great Britain and Ireland was established in 1906. Its original membership reflected a wide set of "disciplines within pathology." Society membership is generally aligned to practitioners of cellular pathology. In 2006 the society celebrated its centenary.

A monograph outlining the full history of the society was published as a limited edition in 2006 to mark the Centenary. It was edited by Peter Hall (then the Secretary of the Society and now the editor of the Journal of Pathology) and Nicholas Wright (the then President of the Society). All the chapters of the monograph are freely available as PDFs from the society's website, which also has a brief summary of the society's history.

== Activities ==
The society promotes its mission through a range of activities and initiatives.

- Meetings: typically two each year at which lectures, original research and workshops are used to share information.
- Lectures: the society supports several named lectures each year.
  - Doniach Lecture
  - Goudie Lecture and medal
  - Oakley Lecture
- Grants: The society funds a range of studentships and related activities aligned to its mission.
- Journal: The Journal of Pathology is sponsored by the society and published by Wiley. It is the highest ranked pathology journal as measured by its impact factor.

== Membership and profile ==
The membership of the society is mainly drawn from the UK and includes an international membership. Members are clinical and experimental pathologists. There is a strong representation of academic pathologists within the membership. A Trainees Group operates within the membership and represents those who are in the process of training in the discipline of pathology. More recently, in parallel with the Royal College of Pathologists, the society introduced an undergraduate membership scheme as part of an initiative to increase undergraduate engagement in pathology and research.

The society is run by a committee elected from its membership. A group of Officers of the Society manage executive functions. These include a President (Sarah Coupland), a General Secretary (Mark J. Arends), a Treasurer (Graeme I. Murray) and a Meetings Secretary (Mohammad Ilyas).

Several subcommittees advise the main committee, especially in developing research, education, & training. The society is also registered as a charity in the UK.
