= Nicholas Wright (pathologist) =

British professor and medical doctor (born 1945)

Sir Nicholas Wright
- Born: 24 February 1945 (age 81)
- Education: Durham Medical School; Newcastle University
- Scientific career
- Thesis: Studies in the control of cell proliferation in mammalian tissues (1975)

Sir Nicholas Alcwyn Wright is a British professor and medical doctor. He was the Warden of Barts and The London School of Medicine and Dentistry.

Wright attended Bristol Grammar School and Durham Medical School accepted him straight into the second year before he graduated in 1965 and proceeded to achieve two post-graduate degrees in pathology at Newcastle University.

He was Professor of Pathology at the Royal Postgraduate Medical School at the Hammersmith Hospital, and then became the Dean of the Royal Postgraduate Medical School before becoming the Deputy Principal of the Imperial College School of Medicine in 1998. Sir Nicholas was Warden of Barts and The London from 2001 until 2009. He is also Head of the Histopathology Unit at Cancer Research (UK) Ltd, President of the Pathological Society of Great Britain and Ireland and was the President of the British Society of Gastroenterology in 2003-04.

He was knighted in the New Year Honours list for 2006 "for services to medicine". He was elected a Fellow of the Academy of Medical Sciences (FMedSci) in 1998.
