= Eric Walker (footballer) =

Scottish footballer

Personal information
- Full name: Eric Walker
- Date of birth: 5 October 1933 (age 93)
- Place of birth: Scotland
- Position: Winger

Senior career*
Years	Team	Apps	(Gls)
- Alloa
1959–1961	Dundee United	8	(2)
1961–1962	Brechin City	13	(1)
- * Club domestic league appearances and goals

Eric Walker (born 5 October 1933) is a Scottish former footballer who played as a winger.

== Career ==
Walker played for Alloa before joining Dundee United in 1959. After two years at Tannadice, Walker moved to Brechin City, making thirteen league appearances in his solitary season at Glebe Park.
