= Orbital lymphoma =

Human disease of the eye

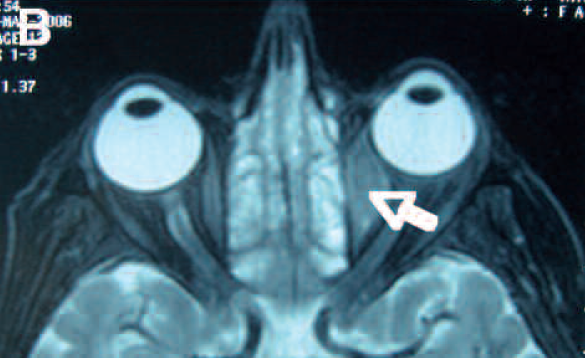
- Specialty: Oncology

Orbital lymphoma is a common type of non-Hodgkin lymphoma that occurs near or on the eye. Common symptoms include decreased vision and uveitis. Orbital lymphoma can be diagnosed via a biopsy of the eye and is usually treated with radiotherapy or in combination with chemotherapy.

== Types ==
There are two main types of intraocular lymphomas: primary central nervous system involvement (PCNSL) and primary central nervous system with ocular involvement (PCNSLO). The difference between PCNSL and PCNSLO is that PNSCL involves the central nervous system, while PCNSLO does not. 56-86% of orbital lymphomas are classified PCNSL and 15-25% are classified PCNSLO.

PCNSLO is common in people who are severely immunosuppressed.

Symptoms of this form of ocular lymphoma include painless decreased vision, sensitivity to light, a red eye, and floaters. Diagnosis is difficult due to its gradual onset and the fact that the symptoms are the same as other diseases.

PCNSLO is usually bilateral, but sometimes grows unevenly. Like other metastatic tumors of the eye, it is usually confined to the choroid.

== Signs and symptoms ==
Primary visible signs of ocular lymphoma include proptosis and a visible mass in the eye. Symptoms are due to mass effect.

== Pathophysiology ==
Recent studies have detected the presence of viral DNA in ocular lymphoma cells. This implies that pathogens play a role in ocular lymphoma. Other studies have found that the aging population, the increasing number of immunosuppressive drugs, and the AIDS epidemic have also contributed to the increased incidence of Non-Hodgkin lymphomas.

Ocular MALT lymphomas may also be associated with Chlamydia psittaci, although whether or not this is the case is still debated.

Follicular lymphoma, diffuse large B cell lymphoma, mantle cell lymphoma, B-cell chronic lymphocytic leukemia, peripheral T-cell lymphoma, and natural killer cell lymphoma have also been reported to affect the orbit.

== Diagnosis ==
=== Classification ===
There are two types of ocular lymphomas: intraocular lymphomas and adnexal lymphomas. An intraocular lymphoma occurs within the eye, while an adnexal lymphoma occurs outside, but adjoined to the eye.

== Treatment ==
Radiotherapy is the most effective treatment for local disease either as the sole treatment for low-grade lymphoma or in combination with chemotherapy for intermediate- and high-grade lymphoma. Radiotherapy dose in range of 30-45 Gy administered in fractions are advised in treating the local orbital lymphomas.

== Epidemiology ==
Orbital lymphoma accounts for 55% of malignant orbital tumors in adults. In one study, this was 10% of patients presenting with orbital tumors or similar lesions. Orbital lymphoma is more prevalent in Asia and Europe than in the United States.

Although intraocular lymphoma is rare, the number of cases per year is rising, affecting mainly people in their seventies and immunocompromised patients. A recent study has shown that ocular lymphoma is more prevalent in women than men.

The survival rate is approximately 60% after 5 years.
