= Micrometastasis =

Small collection of cancer cells that has spread to another part of the body

A micrometastasis is a small collection of cancer cells that has been shed from the original tumor and spread to another part of the body through the lymphovascular system. Micrometastases are too few in size and quantity to be picked up in a screening or diagnostic test, and therefore cannot be seen with imaging tests such as a mammogram, MRI, ultrasound, PET, or CT scans. These migrant cancer cells may group together to form a second tumor, which is so small that it can only be seen under a microscope. Approximately 90 per cent of people who die from cancer die from metastatic disease, since these cells are so challenging to detect. It is important for these cancer cells to be treated immediately after discovery, in order to prevent the relapse (regrowth of the cancer) and the likely death of the patient.

== Detection of micrometastatic cells ==
The major concern with micrometastases is that the only way to determine if they are present in distant tissue is to remove cells from where they are located and look at slices of the tissue under the microscope. The typical biopsy procedure involves hematoxylin and eosin (H&E) staining of specific markers that correspond to the particular tumor type. Although surgeons are able to remove parts of a single lymph node from the body to screen, it is impossible to remove every lymph node and other organs (lungs, liver, bones, etc.) to look for spread. Doctors must assume that the tumor cells have likely spread to other regions of the body if micrometastases are present in one of the lymph nodes. The presence or absence of micrometastases is crucial in choosing the right treatment option for cancer patients.

The detection of micrometastases in the sentinel lymph nodes (SLN) is the primary indicator of its spread to the regional lymph nodes, bone marrow, peripheral blood and ultimately to distant metastatic sites, since they are the first of the nodes that cancer would travel to. This concept applies to melanoma, breast cancer, and other solid tumors, including colorectal, esophageal, stomach, lung, head and neck, vulvar, and penile cancers. Therefore, the presence of these cells in the SLN can help make predictions regarding the patient’s diagnosis and prognosis. For example, it has been found that the prognosis of women who have micrometastases to the sentinel lymph node is poorer than that of women who do not have any evidence of tumor in these lymph nodes. The same applies to patients with melanoma and the other solid tumor cancers.

Before the micrometastases colonize at a distant site, the tumor cells can be found in the bone marrow or peripheral blood. Tumor cells found in the bone marrow are known as disseminated tumor cells (DTCs), and those found in the peripheral blood are known as circulating tumor cells (CTCs). These cells have successfully left the primary tumor microenvironment and the SLNs, and are able to survive in a non-native environment, which makes them more aggressive.

== Treatment of micrometastases ==
In breast cancer patients, if micrometastases are present in the SLN, removal of these nodes is often the next step in treatment. Axillary lymph node dissection involves the excision of the nodes from the armpit, or axilla, region. Depending on the progression of the cells, the surgeon will determine the level of dissection that is required. Level one is the least invasive, as it involves just the removal of tissue around the axillary vein, while level three is the most aggressive as it removes all of the nodal tissue from the axilla. It may be necessary to remove other lymph nodes in addition to the SLN. Each woman has a different number of lymph nodes in her body, so determining how many nodes to remove is based on location, rather than number. The lymph nodes serve as a filtering system for the lymphatic system, so it is important to preserve as many as possible, while also ridding the body of all cancer cells.

In order to eliminate micrometastases that are not near lymph nodes and have traveled to distant regions of the body, chemotherapy and radiation therapies are necessary. However, since most micrometastatic tumor cells are in the nonproliferative G0 phase, standard cytotoxic chemotherapies may not be as useful. Therefore, adjuvant chemotherapy and adjuvant radiation therapy are more effective to eliminate micrometastases, since they are aimed to target dividing and quiescent cells. Adjuvant therapies are administered after the removal of the lymph nodes. The significance of these therapies is to serve as a “clean up” method for those cells that have migrated elsewhere from the primary tumor. Researchers still question whether this treatment method to rid the body of this small cluster of cells that may or may not progress is worth the side effects that it may cause. Side effects include fatigue, hair loss, nausea, or vomiting. In addition, adjuvant therapies do not always result in a cure and they do not benefit all patients.
