= Plaque radiotherapy =

- ICD-10-PCS: D8Y0FZZ
- ICD-9-CM: 92.27

Plaque radiotherapy is a type of radiation therapy used to treat eye tumors. A thin piece of metal (usually gold) with radioactive seeds placed on one side is sewn onto the outside wall of the eye with the seeds aimed at the tumor. It is removed at the end of treatment, which usually lasts for several days.

Iodine-125 is among the isotopes used.
