= Santosh G. Honavar =

Indian ophthalmologist

- Born: Pune, Maharashtra, India
- Education: Bangalore Medical College and Research Institute; AIIMS Delhi; Wills Eye Hospital
- Known for: Studies on ocular oncology
- Awards: 1990 Pfizer National Award; 1992 AIOS Col. Rangachari Gold Medal; 2000 ISO Young Scientist Award; 2001 APSOS Dr. Vengala Rao Award; 2001 APSOS Achievement Award; 2002 AAO Best of Show Award; 2002 AAO Achievement Award; 2006 AAO Best of Show Award; 2007 AIOS Dr. Siva Reddy International Award; 2009 AAO Senior Achievement Award; 2009 Shanti Swarup Bhatnagar Prize; 2013: MA Matin Award, Bangladesh Academy of Ophthalmology,2013: Jerry Shields International Award, APAO; 2019: Distinguished Service Award, APAO; 2019: Peter Rogers Oration, RANZCO; 2019: Lifetime Achievement Award by the American Academy of Ophthalmology; 2020: Honorary Fellowship of the Royal College of Ophthalmologists, UK.
- Scientific career
- Fields: Ophthalmology
- Workplaces: L. V. Prasad Eye Institute; Centre for Sight
- Doctoral advisor: Jerry A. Shields; Carol Shields; Arun Singh

Santosh Gajanan Honavar is an Indian ophthalmologist and is currently the Honorary General Secretary of the All India Ophthalmological Society; Director of Medical Services (Centre for Sight Group); Director, Department of Ocular Oncology and Oculoplasty at Centre for Sight, Hyderabad; and Director, National Retinoblastoma Foundation. He was the Editor of the Indian Journal of Ophthalmology and Indian Journal of Ophthalmology - Case Reports, the official journals of the All India Ophthalmological Society from 2017 to 2023.

A former head of the Department of Ophthalmic Plastic Surgery and Ocular Oncology and associate director at L. V. Prasad Eye Institute, he is known for his research on retinoblastoma. He is counted among the top 2% of world researchers and tops the list of researchers in Ophthalmology in India.

The Council of Scientific and Industrial Research, the apex agency of the Government of India for scientific research, awarded him the Shanti Swarup Bhatnagar Prize for Science and Technology, one of the highest Indian science awards, for his contributions to Medical Sciences in 2009. (Note: Long link – please select award year to see details). Dr Honavar is the only Indian Ophthalmologist to receive the Lifetime Achievement Award by the American Academy of Ophthalmology and the Honorary Fellowship of the Royal College of Ophthalmologists, London, UK.

== Biography ==
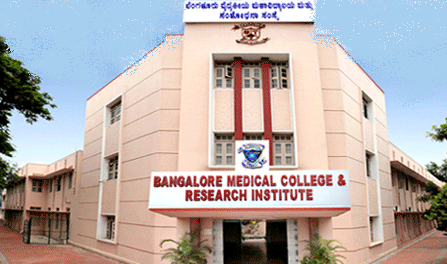
Bangalore Medical College

Santosh Honavar, born in Pune in the Indian state Maharashtra to Bhavani Ganapi Melinkeri and Gajanan Narayan Honavar, graduated in medicine from Bangalore Medical College and Research Institute and did his post-graduate training and Senior Residency in Ophthalmic Plastic Surgery, Glaucoma and Pediatric Ophthalmology at Dr. Rajendra Prasad Center for Ophthalmic Sciences of the All India Institute of Medical Sciences, Delhi. Subsequently, he moved to the US to undergo advanced training at Wills Eye Hospital of Thomas Jefferson University where he had the opportunity to train under Jerry A. Shields, Carol Shields and Arun Singh. On his return to India, he continued to work with L. V. Prasad Eye Institute (LVPEI) where he strengthened the Department of Ophthalmic Plastic Surgery and founded Ocular Oncology Service, the first facility for ocular oncology in India. He rose to become the associate director of LVPEI and last held the position of the director of Patient Care Policies and Planning at LVPEI. Subsequently, he moved to Centre for Sight, Hyderabad (CFS) and heads the Department of Ocular Oncology and Ophthalmic Plastic Surgery. He is also the director of National Retinoblastoma Foundation since 2013 and CFS Education, the educational and training division of Centre for Sight. He has been working in close association with the renowned oncologist Vijay Anand Reddy for over 20 years now, managing the entire spectrum of tumors of the eye and adnexa. In addition to his clinical responsibilities, Dr Honavar is currently the editor of Indian Journal of Ophthalmology, and Indian Journal of Ophthalmology Case Reports.

== Legacy ==
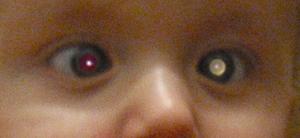
Leukocoria in a child with retinoblastoma

Ocular oncology, especially retinoblastoma, has been the principal research area of Honavar and he is known to have contributed to the understanding and treatment of various tumors affecting the ocular surface and orbit. Working on retinoblastoma, he developed various therapeutic and management protocols which included high-dose and periocular chemotherapy, adjuvant therapy to mitigate the high risk of metastasis and multimodal management of orbital affection of the disease and he is reported to have treated over 2000 pediatric retinoblastoma patients with a success rate above of 85%. At L. V. Prasad Eye Institute, he was the first to perform intra-ocular brachytherapy procedure, along with Vijay Anand Reddy. His article can be found in online repositories such as Google Scholar and ResearchGate. Besides, he has contributed chapters to books published by others. He is a section editor for Asia Pacific Academy of Ophthalmology and is a member of the advisory committee of International Council of Ophthalmology. He serves as the scientific program coordinator of Oculoplastic Association of India and has also mentored research scholars in their studies. The invited speeches delivered by him include the BOPSS 2016 of the British Oculoplastic Surgery Society.

== Awards and honors ==
1. Honavar, who held the ARVO-Santen International Fellowship in 1996 and Zeigler International Fellowship of Orbis International in 1999, is a recipient of the Pfizer National Award (1990) and the Col. Rangachari Gold Medal (1992) of the All India Ophthalmological Society.
2. The Indian Society of Oncology awarded him the Young Scientist Award in 2000 and he received two awards from the Andhra Pradesh State Ophthalmological Society in 2001 viz. Dr. Vengala Rao Award and Career Achievement Award.
3. He has received five honors from American Academy of Ophthalmology, the Best of Show Award in 2002, 2006 and 2010, Achievement Award in 2002, and the Senior Achievement Award in 2009. In between, he received the Dr. Siva Reddy International Award of All India Ophthalmological Society in 2007.
4. The Council of Scientific and Industrial Research awarded the Shanti Swarup Bhatnagar Prize, one of the highest Indian science awards in 2009.
5. He also delivered the Dr. Surya Prasad Rao Award Oration of the Andhra Pradesh State Ophthalmological Association in 2006.
1. MA Matin Award, Bangladesh Academy of Ophthalmology, 2013
2. Jerry Shields International Award, APAO, 2013
3. Distinguished Service Award, APAO, 2019
4. Peter Rogers Oration, RANZCO, 2019
5. In December, 2019, he was awarded the Life Achievement Honor Award by the American Academy of Ophthalmology, he's the first Indian to receive the award.
6. Dr Honavar is the only Indian to be bestowed upon the Honorary Fellowship of the Royal College of Ophthalmologists, UK, 2020.

== See also ==
- Retinoblastoma protein
- Coats' disease
- Trilateral retinoblastoma
- Pinealoblastoma
