= Julia Haller =

American ophthalmologist

Julia A. Haller
- Born: Baltimore, Maryland
- Education: Harvard Medical School (MD); Princeton University (AB)
- Medical career
- Profession: Ophthalmologist
- Institutions: Wills Eye Hospital; Sidney Kimmel Medical College at Thomas Jefferson University
- Sub-specialties: Retina
- Research: Diabetic retinopathy; Age-related macular degeneration; Retinal pharmacology; Healthcare disparities; Ggender equity
- Website: www.willseye.org

Julia A. Haller is an American ophthalmologist who is Chief Executive Officer of Wills Eye Hospital, and a Professor and Chair of the Department of Ophthalmology at Sidney Kimmel Medical College at Thomas Jefferson University. She also holds the William Tasman, M.D. Endowed Chair at Wills Eye Hospital in Philadelphia, where she is Ophthalmologist-in-Chief.

== Education ==
Haller attended the Bryn Mawr School. She received her A.B. from Princeton University, magna cum laude. She received her medical training at Harvard Medical School, followed by an internship at Johns Hopkins and a fellowship in ocular pathology at Manhattan Eye, Ear and Throat Hospital. Her residency was at the Wilmer Eye Institute at Johns Hopkins Hospital, followed by a retina fellowship at Hopkins. She was appointed the first female Chief Resident at Wilmer in 1986.

== Career ==
Haller became the inaugural Katharine Graham Professor of Ophthalmology at Wilmer Eye Institute in 2002. She also became the first holder of the Robert Bond Welch, M.D. Professorship of Ophthalmology there in 2006. At Wilmer, she directed the Retina Fellowship Training Program from 2001 to 2007.

In 2025, she became Chief Executive Officer of Wills Eye Hospital. In 2007, she became the Ophthalmologist-in-Chief of Wills Eye Hospital and co-director of the Wills Vision Research Center at Jefferson. She also is an attending surgeon at Children's Hospital of Philadelphia in the Division of Ophthalmology.

Haller is a member of the National Academy of Medicine, numerous international scientific advisory boards, and sits on the Board of Trustees of the Association of University Professors of Ophthalmology (AUPO), the College of Physicians of Philadelphia, and the Society of Heed Fellows. She is former president of the Women in Medicine Legacy Foundation. Haller joined the Board of Directors of Celgene In 2015 and Outlook Therapeutics in 2022.

She serves on the Board of the Johns Hopkins Medical and Surgical Association, and the Philadelphia Orchestra, and is a past member of the Board of Trustees of Princeton University.

== Awards and honors ==
Her honors include:

- Lifetime Mentorship Award, Vit-Buckle Society, March 2022
- Member, National Academy of Medicine, 2019
- Philadelphia Inquirer's "Physician of the Year," August 2019
- Women Inc.'s 2018 "Most Influential Corporate Directors"
- American Academy of Ophthalmology EnergEYES Award, 2018
- ARVO Gold Fellow, Association for Research in Vision and Ophthalmology, 2015
- J. Donald M. Gass Medal for Outstanding Achievement in Macula Disease, The Macula Society, 2015
- Louis Braille Award, Associated Services for the Blind, 2014
- Heed-Gutman Award, Society of Heed Fellows, 2013
- American Academy of Ophthalmology (AAO) Life Achievement Honor Award, 2011
- AAO Senior Achievement Award
- Vitreous Society Senior Honor Award
- Kreissig Award from EURETINA, 2008
- Gertrude Pyron Award from the Retina Research Foundation and the American Society of Retina Specialists, 2010

== Publications ==
Haller has published over 400 scientific articles and book chapters.
