= Trofosfamide =

Chemical compound

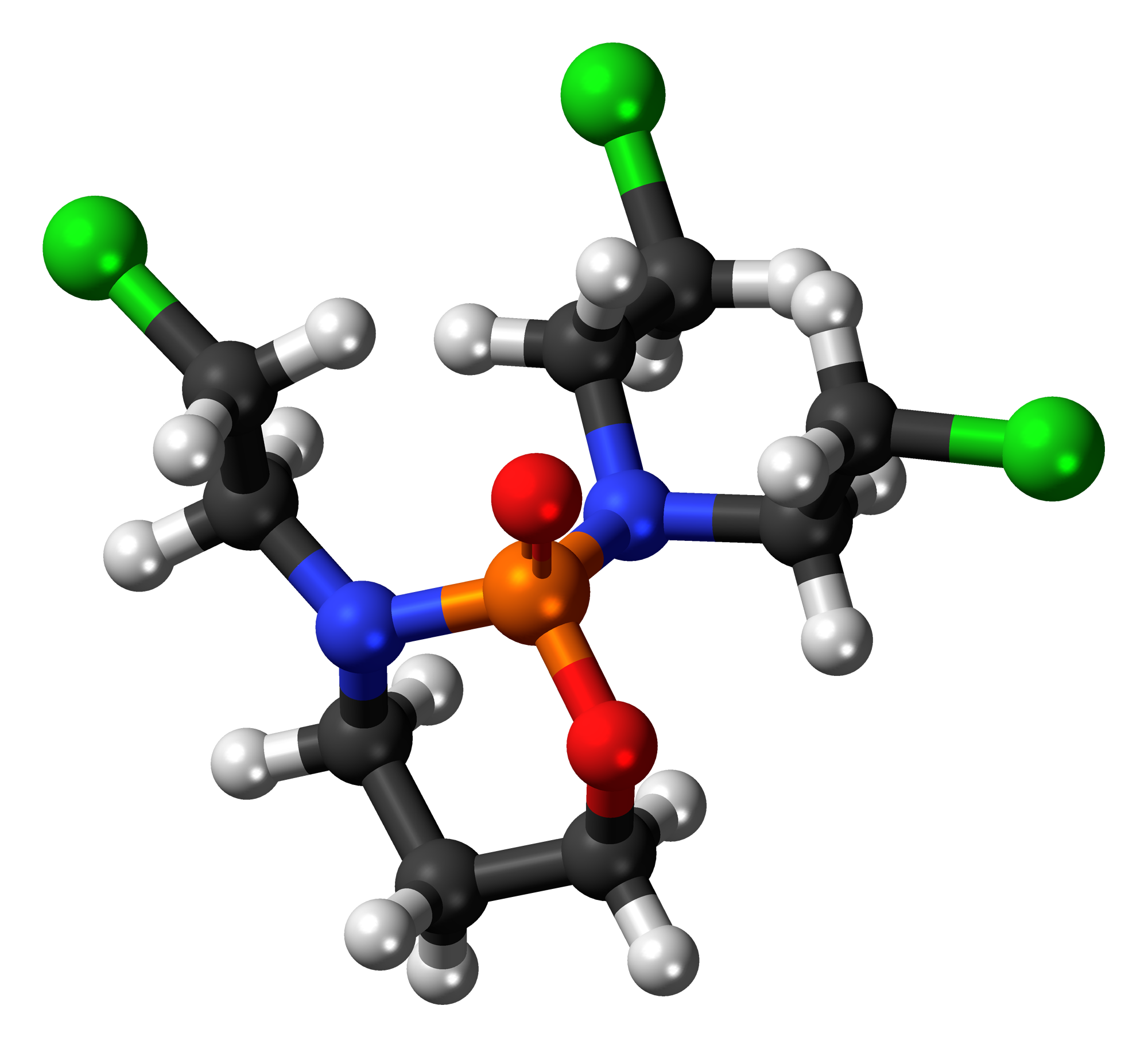

Clinical data
- Trade names: Ixoten
- AHFS/Drugs.com: International Drug Names
- Routes of administration: By mouth (film-coated tablets)
- ATC code: L01AA07 (WHO)

Legal status
- Legal status: DE: § 48 AMG/§ 1 MPAV (Prescription only)

Identifiers
- IUPAC name: N,N,3-tris(2-chloroethyl)-1,3,2-oxazaphosphinan-2-amide 2-oxide
- CAS Number: 22089-22-1
- PubChem CID: 65702
- ChemSpider: 59129
- UNII: H64JRU6GJ0
- KEGG: D07252
- ChEMBL: ChEMBL462019
- CompTox Dashboard (EPA): DTXSID60865031
- ECHA InfoCard: 100.040.686

Chemical and physical data
- Formula: C_{9}H_{18}Cl_{3}N_{2}O_{2}P
- Molar mass: 323.58 g·mol^{−1}
- 3D model (JSmol): Interactive image
- SMILES: C1CN(P(=O)(OC1)N(CCCl)CCCl)CCCl
- InChI: InChI=1S/C9H18Cl3N2O2P/c10-2-6-13-5-1-9-16-17(13,15)14(7-3-11)8-4-12/h1-9H2; Key:UMKFEPPTGMDVMI-UHFFFAOYSA-N

Trofosfamide (INN) is a nitrogen mustard alkylating agent. It is sometimes abbreviated "TRO". It has been used in trials to study its effects on ependymoma, medulloblastoma, sarcoma, soft tissue, supratentorial PNET, and recurrent brain tumors.
