= Wills Eye Hospital =

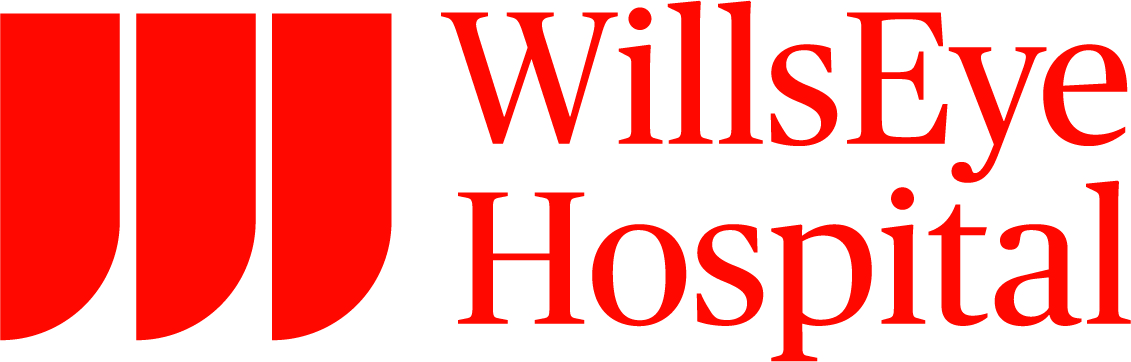

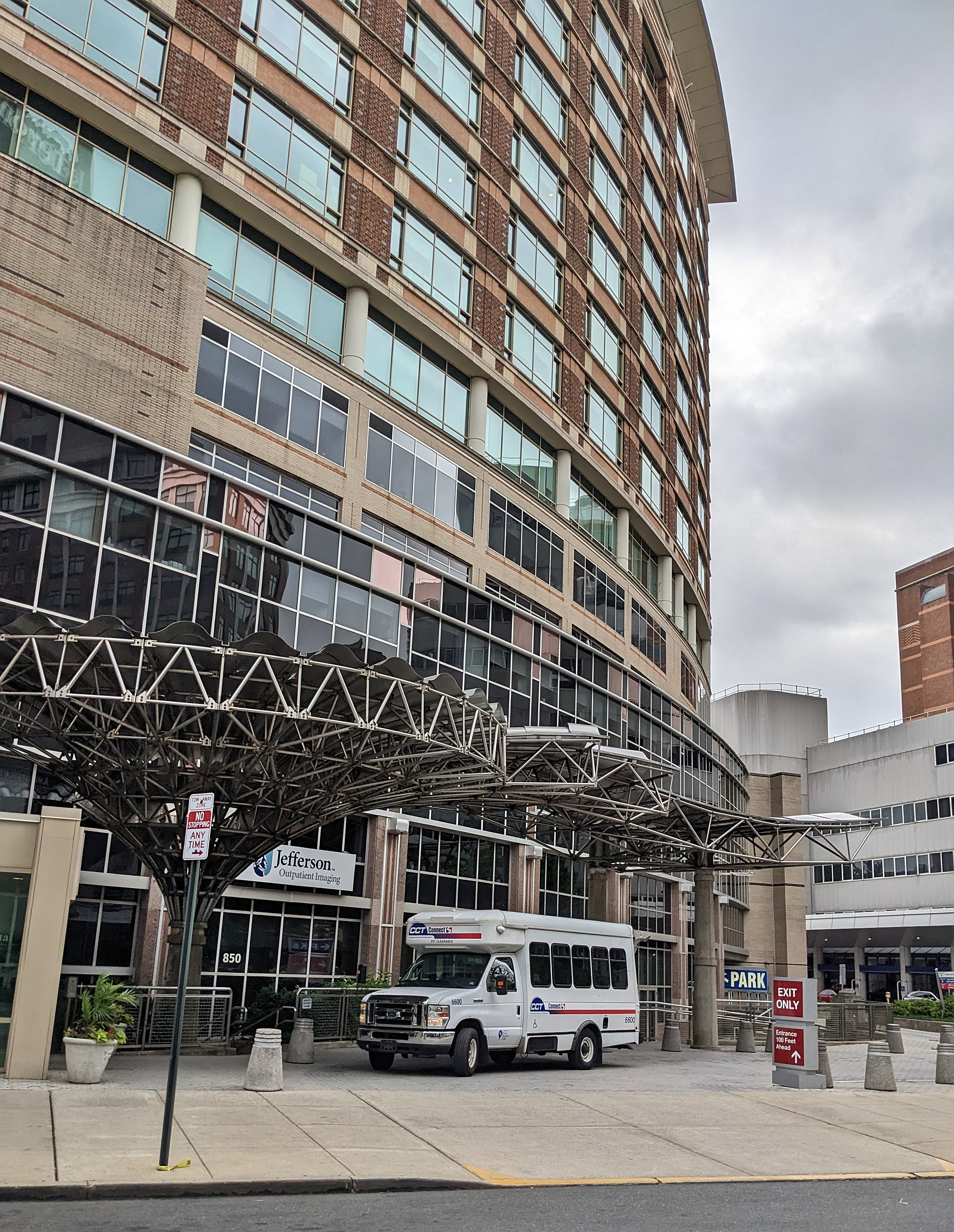
- Wills Eye Hospital outpatient entrance

Geography
- Location: 840 Walnut Street, Philadelphia, Pennsylvania, United States

Organization
- Type: Specialist
- Affiliated university: Thomas Jefferson University

Services
- Speciality: Ophthalmology

History
- Founded: 1832

Links
- Website: http://www.willseye.org
- Lists: Hospitals in Pennsylvania

Wills Eye Hospital is a non-profit eye clinic and hospital in Philadelphia, Pennsylvania. It was established in 1832 and is the oldest continually operating eye-care facility in the United States.

Since 1990, Wills Eye Hospital has consistently been ranked one of the top three ophthalmology hospitals in the United States by U.S. News & World Report and its ophthalmology residency program is considered one of the most competitive residency programs in the world.

== History ==
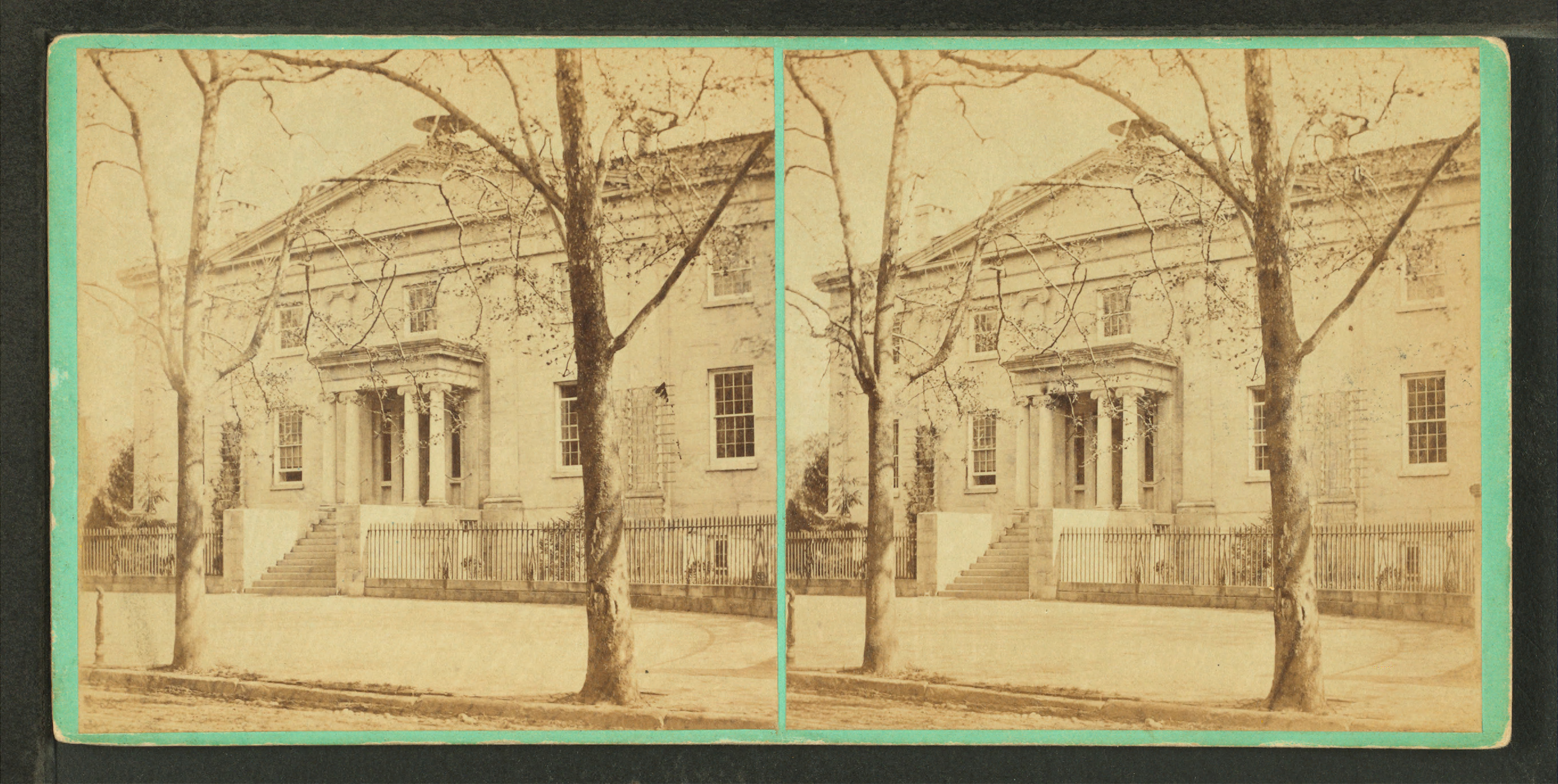
Wills Hospital (1897), 18th & South Logan Square, Philadelphia, PA. Now site of The Logan Hotel.

James Wills Jr., a Quaker merchant, was instrumental in the founding of Wills Eye through his bequest of $116,000 in 1832 to the City of Philadelphia. Wills stipulated that the funds were to be used specifically for the indigent, blind, and lame. Over the years it evolved into solely an eye hospital. The first Wills Hospital opened in 1834 on Logan Square at 18th & Race Streets.

Early surgeons at Wills Eye included Isaac Parrish, M.D. and Isaac Hays, MD, George Fox, M.D., and Squier Littell, M.D., who in 1837 wrote "A Manual of Diseases of the Eye." In 1854, Littell also co-edited "A Treatise on Operative Ophthalmic Surgery" with Henry Haynes Walton.

== Wills Eye Residency Program ==
In 1839 Dr. Isaac Parrish gave the first regular course of instruction on ophthalmic surgery at Wills Eye Hospital in the winter of 1839–1840. Today, Wills Eye is the ophthalmology residency program for Thomas Jefferson University.

== Historic building ==
- Wills Eye Hospital
- U.S. National Register of Historic Places
- Pennsylvania state historical marker
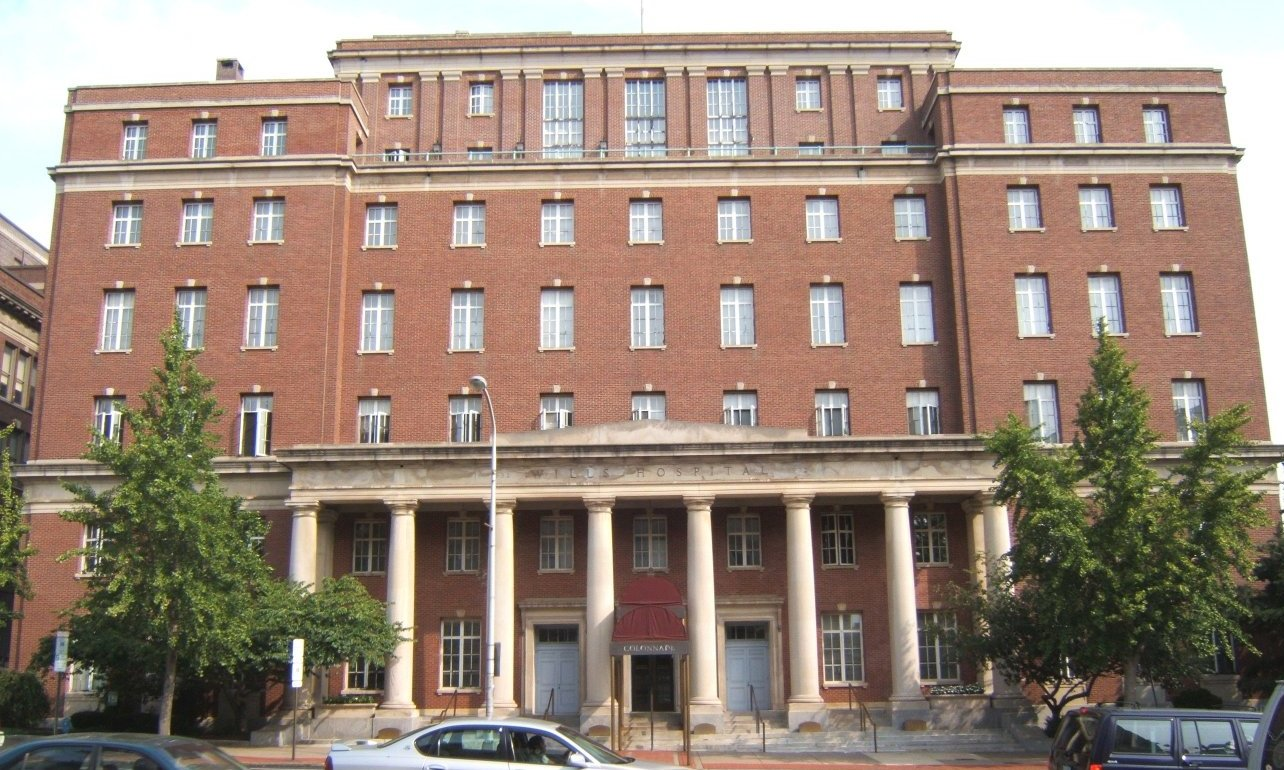
- Wills Hospital location from 1932-1980 (building located at 1601 Spring Garden Street Philadelphia, Pennsylvania)

- Location within Philadelphia Location within Pennsylvania Location within the United States
- Coordinates: 39°57′48″N 75°9′56″W
- Area: 0.8 acres (0.32 ha)
- Built: 1931-1932
- Architect: John T. Windrim
- Architectural style: Federal Tuscan
- NRHP reference No.: 84003582

Significant dates
- Added to NRHP: July 12, 1984
- Designated PHMC: October 9, 2009

The Centennial Building of Wills Eye Hospital was designed by architect John T. Windrim and built in 1931-1932. It is a six-story, brick building measuring 154 by 157 feet (47 by 48 m). The front facade features a portico with eight Tuscan order columns. The building is now residential apartments.

It was added to the National Register of Historic Places in 1984.

== Medical achievements ==
Wills Eye has pioneered many techniques in the field of ophthalmology, including:

- Artificial intraocular lens implant (1952), Warren Reese, MD and Turgut Hamdi, MD
- Invention of a vitrectomy machine (1972), Jay Federman, MD
- Artificial retinal implant (2009), Julia Haller, MD, Allen Ho, MD and Carl Regillo, MD

== Notable people ==
- David Hayes Agnew
- Harrison Allen
- Charles D. Kelman, MD (Wills Eye residency 1956–1960) - father of phacoemulsification and inventor of the cryoprobe
- Jerry A. Shields
- Carol Shields
- George Spaeth
- William Tasman
- Santosh G. Honavar

== Senior officials ==
- Julia A. Haller, MD, Chief Executive Officer (2025-present)
- Joseph Bilson, Chief Executive Officer, Wills Eye (2007–2025)
- Julia A. Haller, MD, Ophthalmologist-in-Chief, Wills Eye (2007–present)
