= Palisade (pathology) =

Microscopic view of single layer of cells

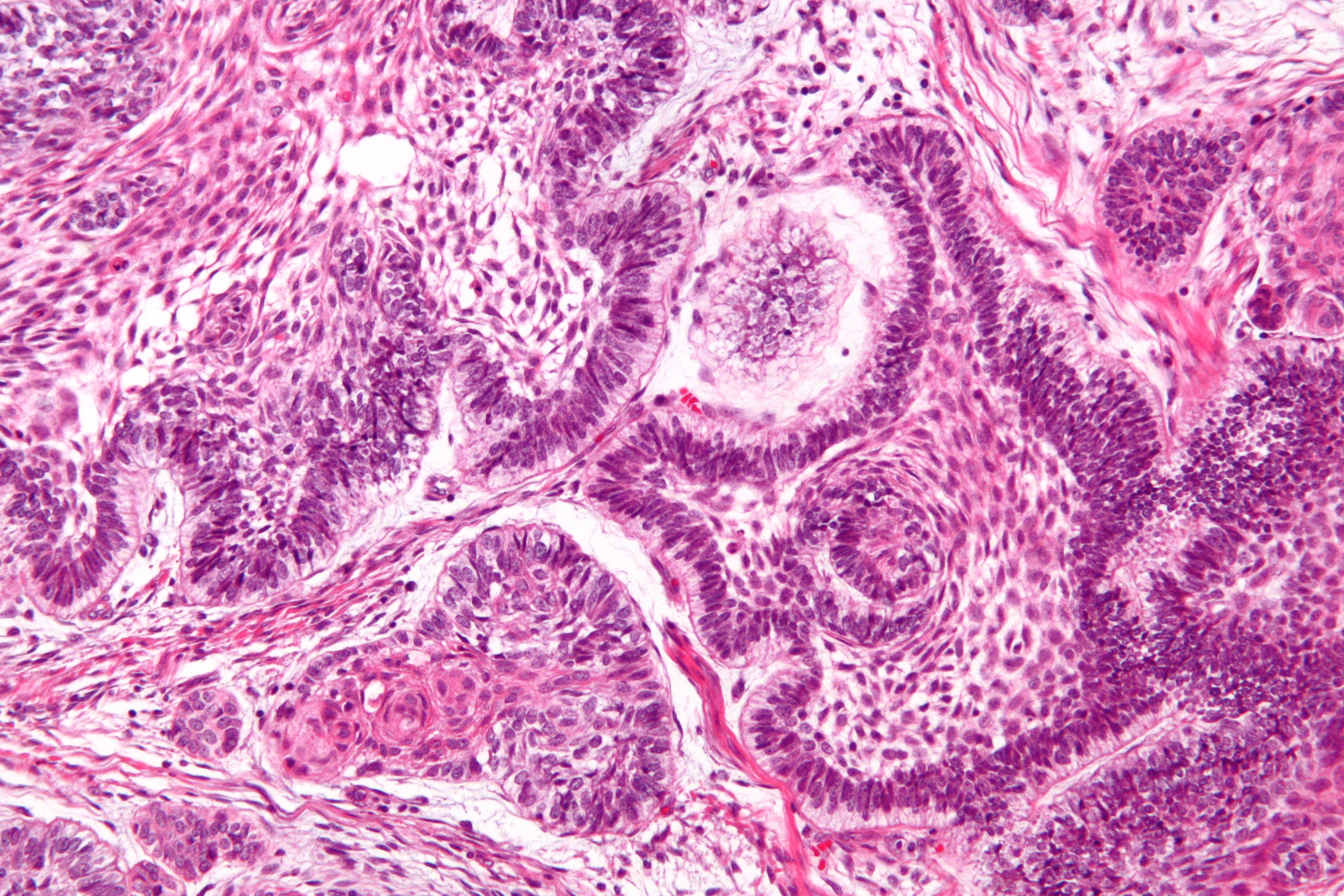
Micrograph of an ameloblastoma showing characteristic palisading. H&E stain.

In histopathology, a palisade is a single layer of relatively long cells, arranged loosely perpendicular to a surface and parallel to each other. A rosette is a palisade in a halo or spoke-and-wheel arrangement, surrounding a central core or hub. A pseudorosette is a perivascular radial arrangement of neoplastic cells around a small blood vessel. Rosettes are characteristic of tumors.

== Rosette ==
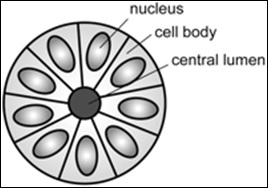
Structure of a rosette in pathology.

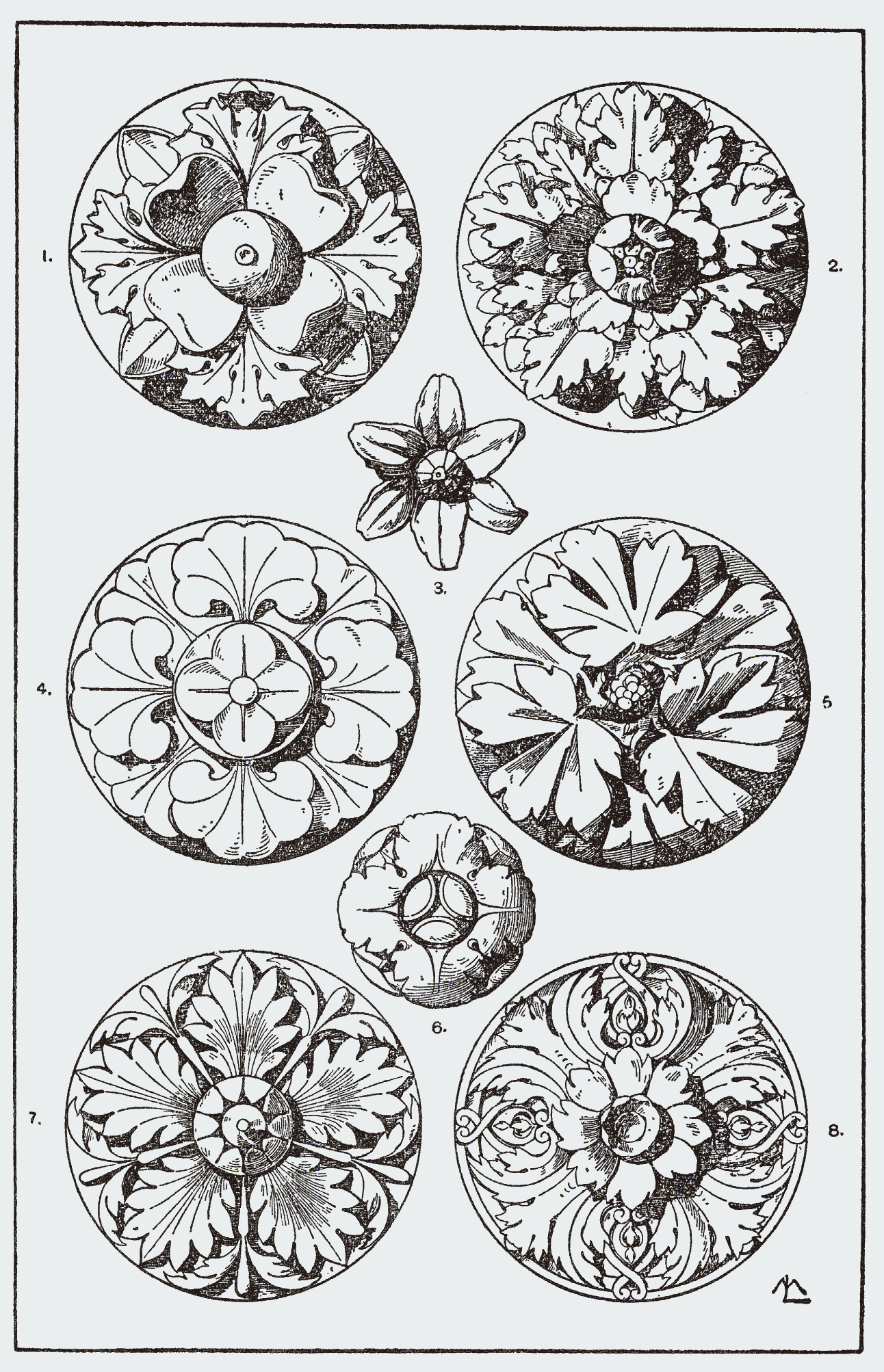
Rosettes are named after the flower-like architectural ornament.

A rosette is a cell formation in a halo or spoke-and-wheel arrangement, surrounding a central core or hub. The central hub may consist of an empty-appearing lumen or a space filled with cytoplasmic processes. The cytoplasm of each of the cells in the rosette is often wedge-shaped with the apex directed toward the central core: the nuclei of the cells participating in the rosette are peripherally positioned and form a ring or halo around the hub.

=== Pathogenesis ===
Rosettes may be considered primary or secondary manifestations of tumor architecture. Primary rosettes form as a characteristic growth pattern of a given tumor type whereas secondary rosettes result from the influence of external factors on tumor growth. For example, regressive cell swelling may centripetally displace the cytoplasm as the nucleus is squeezed to the periphery, forming a secondary rosette. Although the presence of primary rosettes may suggest a given diagnosis, usually this finding alone is not considered absolutely pathognomonic for one specific tumor type.

Loss or gain of genetic information is the main cause of rosette and pseudorosette formation. The cell populations exhibiting neuronal differentiation are believed to secrete surface glycoproteins and glycolipids which mediate cell-to-cell recognition and adhesion. One hypothesis is that these sticky cell surface markers cause the developing cell bodies to cluster or aggregate and their primitive neurites to tangle. As the cells grow, the neurite tangle remains centrally located and the cell bodies are squeezed to the periphery, thus explaining the rosette pattern. Depending upon their location, ependymal cells may display 2 cell poles. A luminal pole projects to the ependymal lining of a ventricle and a "submesenchymal pole" projects toward the surface of the brain demonstrating glial processes and peripherally situated footplates. Frieda and Pollak conceptualize the architecture of ependymomas as a primitive neural tube turned inside out with the submesenchymal poles converging toward a central vessel, thus forming a pseudorosette rather than projecting centrifugally toward the pia.

=== Causes ===
True rosettes are mainly found in neuropathologic disorder. Other conditions where they are present include osteosarcoma, non-Hodgkin lymphoma, fibromyxoid sarcoma, medullary thyroid carcinoma, embryonal tumor with abundant neuropil and true rosettes (ETANTR), rhabdomyosarcoma, chronic cholestasis and chronic active hepatitis, tobacco rosette: complex viral disease, malaria, adenocarcinoma in colon and rectum, hyalinizing spindle cell fused with giant rosette, and endometrial stromal sarcoma with hyalinizing giant rosettes.

=== Flexner–Wintersteiner rosette ===
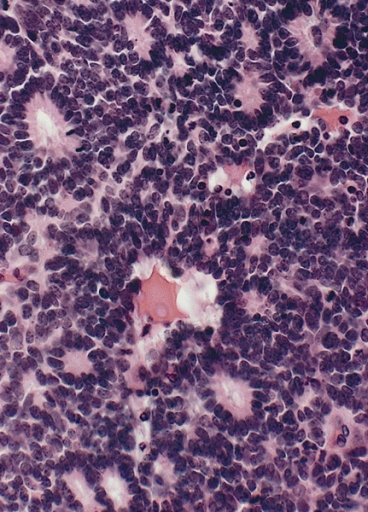
Flexner–Wintersteiner rosettes in retinoblastoma.

Flexner–Wintersteiner rosettes, a spoke-and-wheel shaped cell formation seen in retinoblastoma and certain other ophthalmic tumors,) have been described as a form of palisading.

Unlike the center of the Homer–Wright rosette, the central lumen is devoid of fiber-rich neuropil. The defining feature of this rosette is the central extension of cytoplasmic projections of the surrounding cells. Like the Homer Wright rosette, the Flexner–Wintersteiner rosette represents a specific form of tumor differentiation. Electron microscopy reveals that the tumor cells forming the Flexner–Wintersteiner rosette have ultrastructural features of primitive photoreceptor cells. Furthermore, the rosette lumen shows similar staining patterns as in rods and cones, suggesting that Flexner–Wintersteiner rosettes represent a specific form of retinal differentiation. In addition to being a characteristic finding in retinoblastomas, Flexner–Wintersteiner rosettes may also be found in pinealoblastomas and medulloepitheliomas.

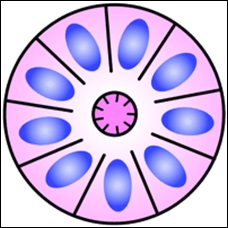
Structure of a Flexner–Wintersteiner rosette

Flexner–Wintersteiner rosettes were first described in 1891 by Simon Flexner, a professor of experimental pathology at the University of Pennsylvania. Flexner noted characteristic clusters of cells in an infantile eye tumor which he called retinoepithelioma. In 1897, Austrian ophthalmologist Hugo Wintersteiner confirmed Flexner's observations and noted that the cell clusters resembled rods and cones. These characteristic rosette formations were subsequently recognized as important features of retinoblastomas.

== Pseudorosette ==
A pseudorosette is a perivascular radial arrangement of neoplastic cells around a small blood vessel. Pseudorosettes are present in neuroblastoma, medulloblastoma, melanoma, ependymoma, Merkel cell carcinoma, neuroendocrine tumor of the skin, seborrheic keratosis, dendritic cell neurofibroma, astroblastoma, large cell neuroendocrine tumor of the cervix, clear cell ependymoma of the spinal cord, celiac disease, nasal tumor of olfactory origin, rosette-forming glioneural tumor (RGNT), oncocytoma, Wilm's tumor, and pheochromocytoma of the urinary bladder.

=== Homer–Wright pseudorosette ===
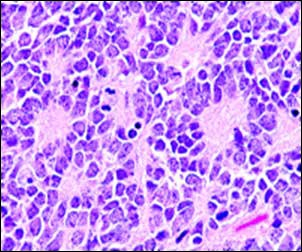
Micrograph of Homer Wright pseudorosettes

A Homer–Wright pseudorosette is a type of pseudorosette in which differentiated tumor cells surround the neuropil. Examples of tumors containing these are neuroblastoma, medulloblastoma, pinealoblastoma, and primitive neuroectodermal tumors of bone. Homer Wright rosettes are considered "pseudo" in the sense that they are not true rosettes. Unlike Flexner–Wintersteiner rosettes, which contain an empty lumen, Homer–Wright rosettes contain abundant fibrillary material. They are named for James Homer Wright.

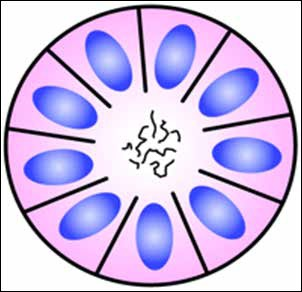
Structure of a Homer-Wright pseudorosette

=== Perivascular pseudorosette ===
A perivascular pseudorosette consists of a spoke-wheel arrangement of cells with tapered cellular processes radiates around a wall of a centrally placed vessel. The modifier “pseudo” differentiates this pattern from the Homer Wright and Flexner-Wintersteiner rosettes, perhaps because the central structure is not actually formed by the tumor itself, but instead represents a native, non-neoplastic element. Also, some early investigators argued about the definition of a central lumen, choosing “pseudo” to indicate that the hub was not a true lumen but contained structures. Nevertheless, this pattern remains extremely diagnostically useful and the modifier unnecessarily leads to confusion. Perivascular pseudorosettes are encountered in most ependymomas regardless of grade or variant. As such, they are significantly more sensitive for the diagnosis of ependymomas than true ependymal rosettes. Unfortunately, perivascular pseudorosettes are also less specific in that they are also encountered in medulloblastomas, PNETs, central neurocytomas, and less often in glioblastomas, and a rare pediatric tumor, monomorphous pilomyxoid astrocytomas.

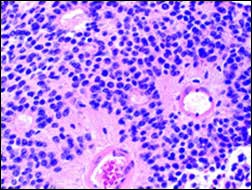
Micrograph of perivascular pseudorosettes

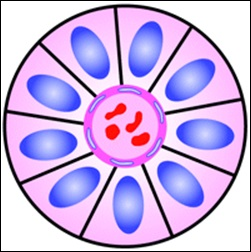
Structure of a perivascular pseudorosette

=== Pineocytomatous/neurocytic pseudorosettes ===
Histologic features of these two tumors are virtually identical, including their tendency to form neuropil-rich rosettes, referred to as pineocytomatous/neurocytic rosettes in central neurocytoma. Both are quite similar to the Homer Wright rosette, but they are generally larger and more irregular in contour. The cells of the pineocytomatous/neurocytic rosettes are also considered to be much more differentiated than the cells forming Homer Wright rosettes in that the nuclei are slightly larger, more rounded, much less mitotically active, and paler or less hyperchromatic. In rare cases, these rosettes may aggregate in a sheet of back-to-back clusters resembling fieldstone pavement.

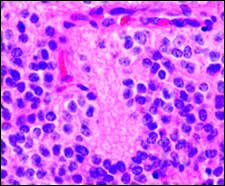
Micrograph of pineocytomatous/neurocytic pseudorosettes

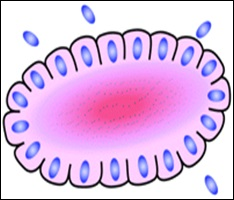
Structure of pineocytomatous/neurocytic pseudorosettes

== Clinical significance of rosettes and pseudorosettes ==
The neuropathologic diagnosis of brain tumors entails the microscopic examination of conventional formalin-fixed paraffin-embedded tissue samples surgically removed from a radiographically defined lesion. Pathologists rely on visual clues such as pattern recognition when examining the stained tissue with a microscope, much as radiologists rely on grayscale patterns of densities and intensities on images. Some histologic patterns of cellular architecture are distinctive if not pathognomonic whereas others are less specific, but nevertheless considerably narrow the differential diagnosis. The precise biologic bases for some of the observed microscopic patterns are poorly understood though their recognition is nonetheless useful. Rosettes are a commonly encountered neuropathologic histologic architectural pattern seen within certain tumors is the rosette. Although more advanced methods of tissue examination have been developed, such as histochemical and immunohistochemical profiling, genetic analysis, and electron microscopy, the microscopic review of H&E stained material remains a critical component of tumor diagnosis.

Immunohistochemical evidence of neuronal differentiation is found in nearly all cases with neuronal markers such as synaptophysin, neuronspecific enolase, and neurofilament protein. Some medulloblastomas may also display other forms of differentiation as demonstrated by the presence of the astrocytic marker glial fibrillary acidic protein. Skeletal muscle and melanocytic differentiation are considerably less common and define the medullomyoblastoma and melanotic medulloblastoma variants, respectively.

== Long palisades ==
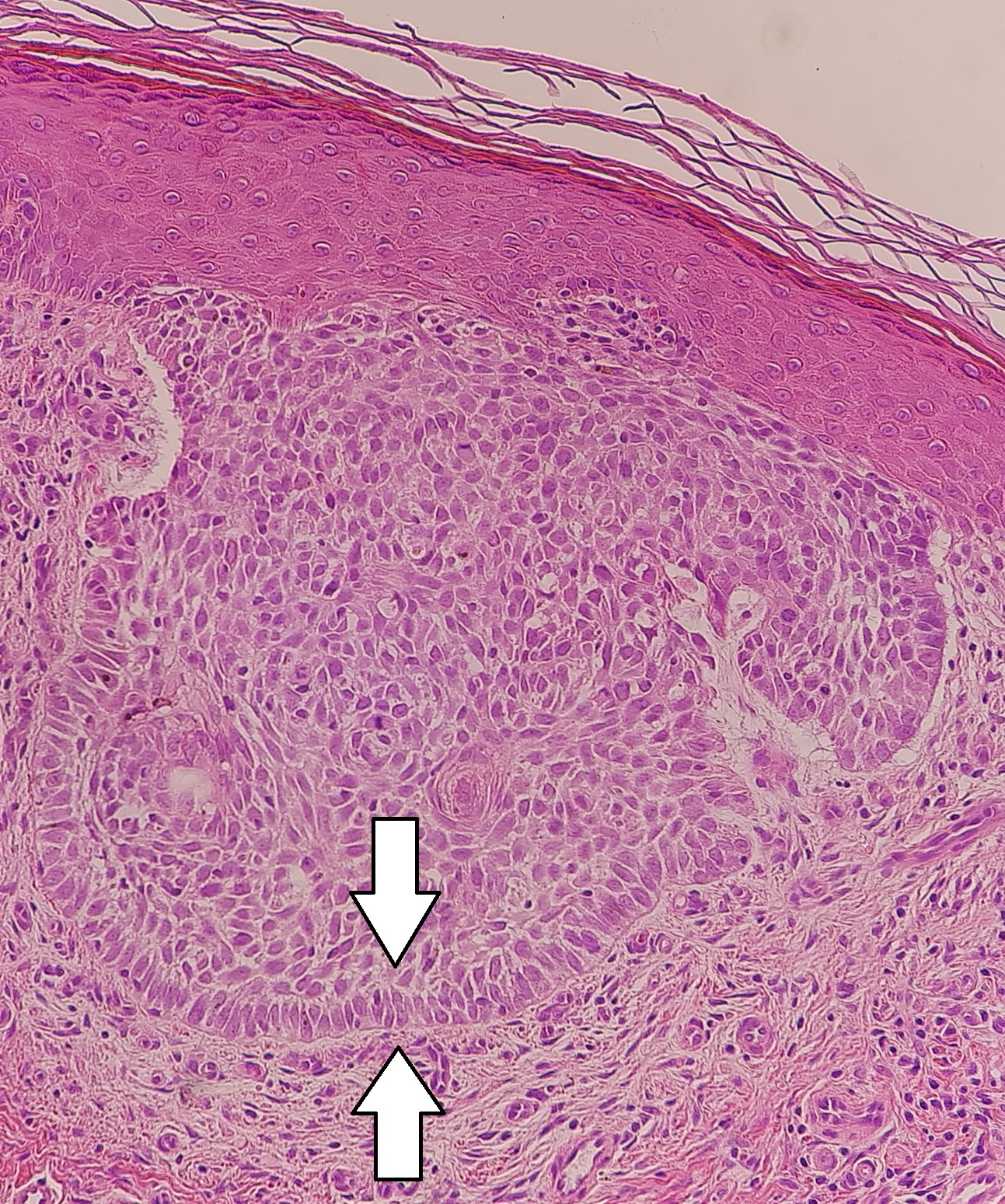
Palisading in nodular basal-cell carcinoma.

Palisades that are generally longer than a rosette or pseudorosette can be seen in neural tumors such as Schwannoma, as well as in ameloblastomas. They can also be seen in nodular basal-cell carcinomas.

== Visually similar findings ==
Pseudopalisading, a visually similar finding, is the formation of hypercellular zones that typically surrounds necrotic tissue.

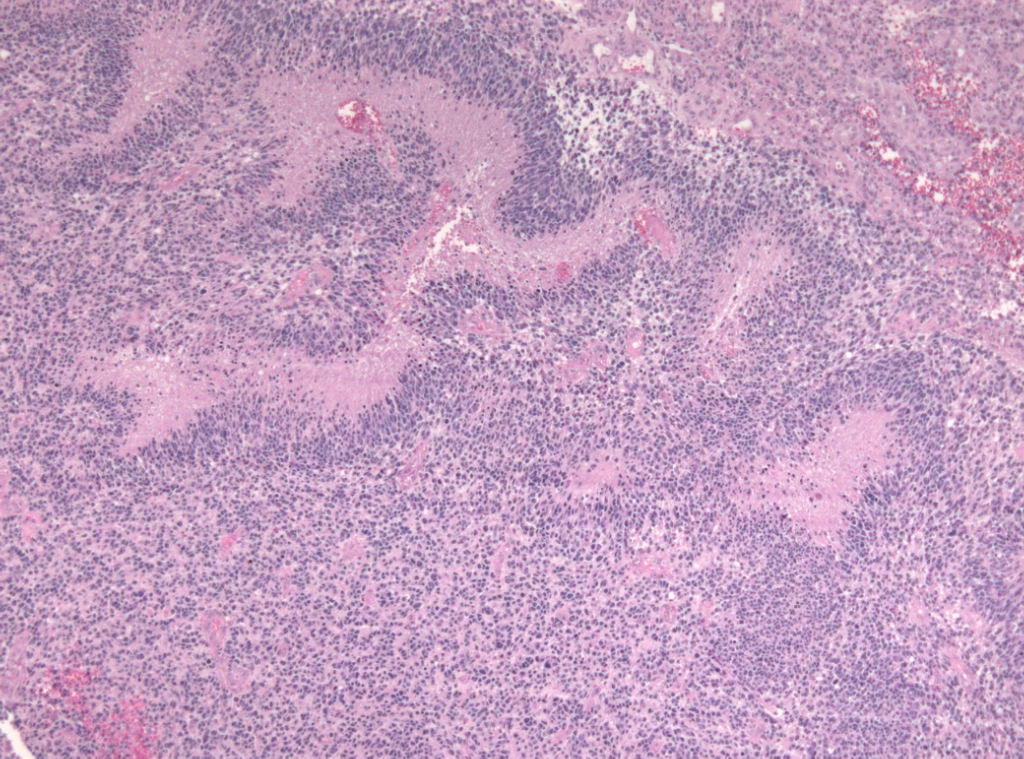
Pseudopalisades seen around necroses in glioblastoma.
