= Diktyoma =

Type of eye tumor

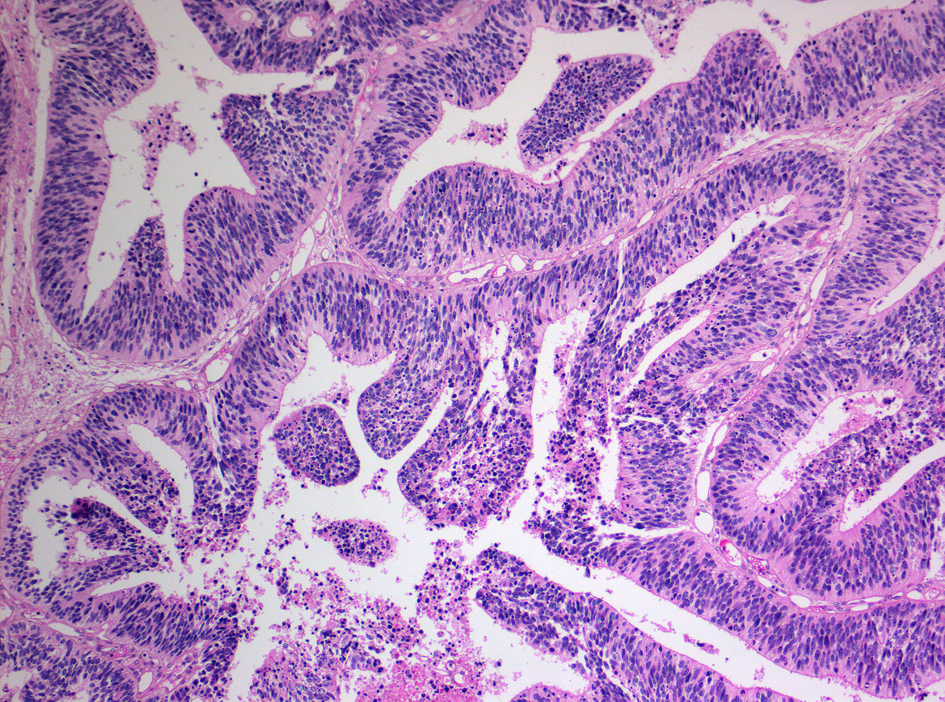
- Histopathology of medulloepithelioma showing characteristic neural tube like strands.

Diktyoma, or ciliary body medulloepithelioma, or teratoneuroma, is a rare tumor arising from primitive medullary epithelium in the ciliary body of the eye. Almost all diktyomas arise in the ciliary body, although, rarely, they may arise from the optic nerve head or retina.

The name "diktyoma" comes from its characteristic findings on histology.

== Signs and symptoms ==
The most common symptoms of diktyoma are vision loss and pain, while the most common signs are leukocoria and presence of a mass in the iris or ciliary body. Other signs and symptoms include lens subluxation, glaucoma, cataract, exophthalmos, buphthalmos, strabismus, and ptosis.

== Diagnosis ==
=== Classification ===
Diktyoma is classified into teratoid and nonteratoid types, based on heteroplastic tissue in the former. Each type may be sub-classified as benign or malignant based on histology.

Based on histology, the tumor is classified as malignant if it contains poorly differentiated neuroblasts, nuclear pleomorphism, markedly abnormal mitotic activity, sarcomatous components, or invasion into the uvea, cornea, or sclera. Most diktyomas are malignant.

=== Imaging findings ===
Imaging studies such as ultrasonography (US), Computerized Tomography (CT) and Magnetic Resonance Imaging (MRI) may aid diagnosis. On ultrasound, diktyomas typically appear as echogenic, irregularly shaped to ovoid masses. Ultrasound is excellent for demonstrating cystic collections of vitreous fluid in the tumor, and may show calcifications in the teratoid type.

On CT, diktyomas typically appear as dense, irregular masses in the ciliary body, which enhances with administration of intravenous contrast material. CT is excellent for demonstrating dystrophic calcifications in the teratoid type.

On MRI, diktyomas typically appear slightly to moderately hyperdense to vitreous on T1-weighted images and hypodense on T2-weighted images, with marked homogeneous enhancement (except for prominent parts of cystic components, which, if present, may impart heterogeneity) after administration of intravenous contrast material. MRI is excellent for detection of tumors as small as 2 millimeters.

=== Gross pathologic findings ===
Grossly, the tumor appears white, gray, or yellow, with irregular surface, often studded with small cysts. More small cysts may be found on cut sections. These cysts may break off the surface and float freely in aqueous or vitreous humour. The tumor may also contain chalky grayish-white particles. The lens may be covered by a semi-translucent membrane in some case. Tumor may invade locally to involve the iris or anterior retina, or through the cornea or sclera. In advanced cases, tumor may fill the entire globe, similar to retinoblastoma.

=== Histologic findings ===
Microscopically, the tumor cells recapitulate embryonic sensory retina or nonpigmented ciliary epithelium. The chalky grayish-white particles within the tumor mass correspond to foci of cartilage on histology; the semi-translucent membrane covering the lens in some tumors corresponds to spreading neoplastic cells.

Tumor cells form a characteristic diktyomatous pattern, with folded cords and sheets resembling a fisherman's net. In early development of the retina, the medullary epithelial cells acquire polarity, such that a basement membrane associated with the vitreous forms the internal limiting membrane on one side, while terminal bars form the outer limiting membrane on the other side. Proliferating tumor cells of diktyoma maintain the same polarity, arranged in cords and sheets folding back upon themselves. Depending on the direction of the folding, some folds surround fluid collection, while others do not. These fluid-filled spaces correspond to the grossly observed small cysts, which are mainly composed of vitreous humor.

About 30-50 percent of diktyomas contain heteroplastic elements, and thus belong to the teratoid subtype. These heteroplastic elements may include hyaline cartilage, rhabdomyoblasts, and neuroglial tissue. Sarcomatous elements may be seen in malignant tumors. Foci of dystrophic calcifications may be present.

== Treatment ==
Diktyoma is treated by either close observation, or enucleation of the eye. Surgical resection is no longer done due to risk of late complications and metastases. Small lesions can be treated with iodine-125 plaque brachytherapy. Distant metastases and mortality are rare. Mortality may occur in patients with extraocular extension to the brain. Lack of glial differentiation, as demonstrated by negative staining for glial fibrillary acidic protein (GFAP), may confer a favourable prognosis.

== Epidemiology ==
Mean age at diagnosis is 5 years. While most cases occur in young children, adult cases have been reported. Incidence is similar in male and female and among different races.
