= Ganglioneuroma =

Benign tumor of the autonomic nervous system

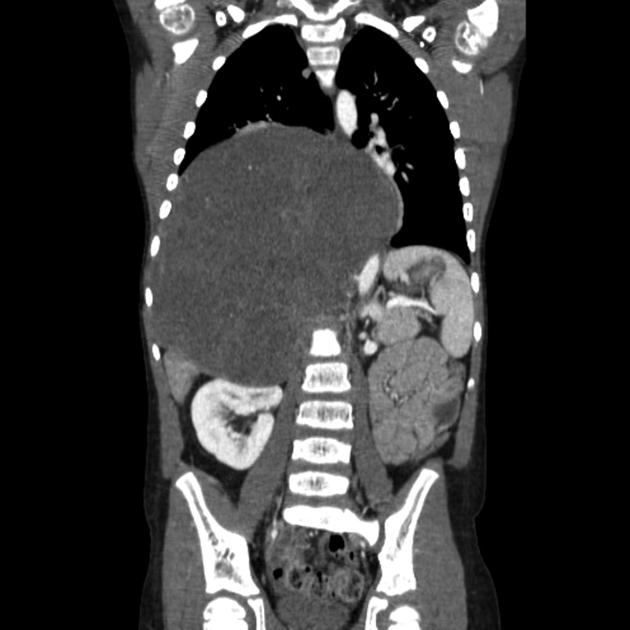
- CT scan of a large ganglioneuroma within the chest cavity
- Specialty: Neuro-oncology

Ganglioneuroma (occasionally called a "ganglioma") is a rare and benign tumor of the autonomic nerve fibers arising from neural crest sympathogonia (undifferentiated cells of the sympathetic nervous system). However, ganglioneuromas themselves are fully differentiated neuronal tumors that do not contain immature elements.

Ganglioneuromas most frequently occur in the abdomen, however these tumors can grow anywhere sympathetic nervous tissue is found. Other common locations include the adrenal gland, paraspinal retroperitoneum, posterior mediastinum, head, and neck. It is contained within the neuroblastic tumors group, which includes: Ganglioneuroma (benign), Ganglioneuroblastoma (intermediate), Neuroblastoma (aggressive).

Since ganglioneuromas are derived from neural crest cells, they may present as composite tumors with other neural crest-derived tumors, such as pheochromocytoma. These are referred to as pheochromocytoma-ganglioneuroma composite tumors. Clinical symptoms are primarily related to the pheochromocytoma component and may include sweating, hypertension, and palpitations due to catecholamine excess.

== Symptoms and signs ==
A ganglioneuroma is typically asymptomatic, and is typically only discovered when being examined or treated for another condition. Any symptoms will depend upon the tumor's location and the nearby organs affected.

For example, a tumor in the chest area may cause breathing difficulty, chest pain, and trachea compression. If the tumor is located lower in the abdomen, it may cause abdominal pain and bloating. A tumor near the spinal cord may cause spinal deformity or spinal compression, leading to pain and loss of muscle control or sensation in the legs and/or arms.

These tumors may produce certain hormones, which can cause diarrhea, an enlarged clitoris (in females), high blood pressure, increased body hair, and sweating.

Composite ganglioneuroma tumors that include pheochromocytoma tissues present with symptoms related to catecholamines excess, with symptoms such as palpitations, high blood pressure, sweating, headache, and anxiety.

== Cause ==
There are no known risk factors for ganglioneuromas. However, the tumors may be associated with some genetic problems, such as neurofibromatosis type 1. Composite ganglioneuroma-pheochromocytoma tumors are seen in patients with pathogenic variants of germline and somatic mosaic origin, such as RET proto-oncogene, CDKN1B, Neurofibromin, SDHB, SDHC, SDHD, VHL, and EPAS1, in association with Pacak-Zhuang syndrome.

== Pathology ==
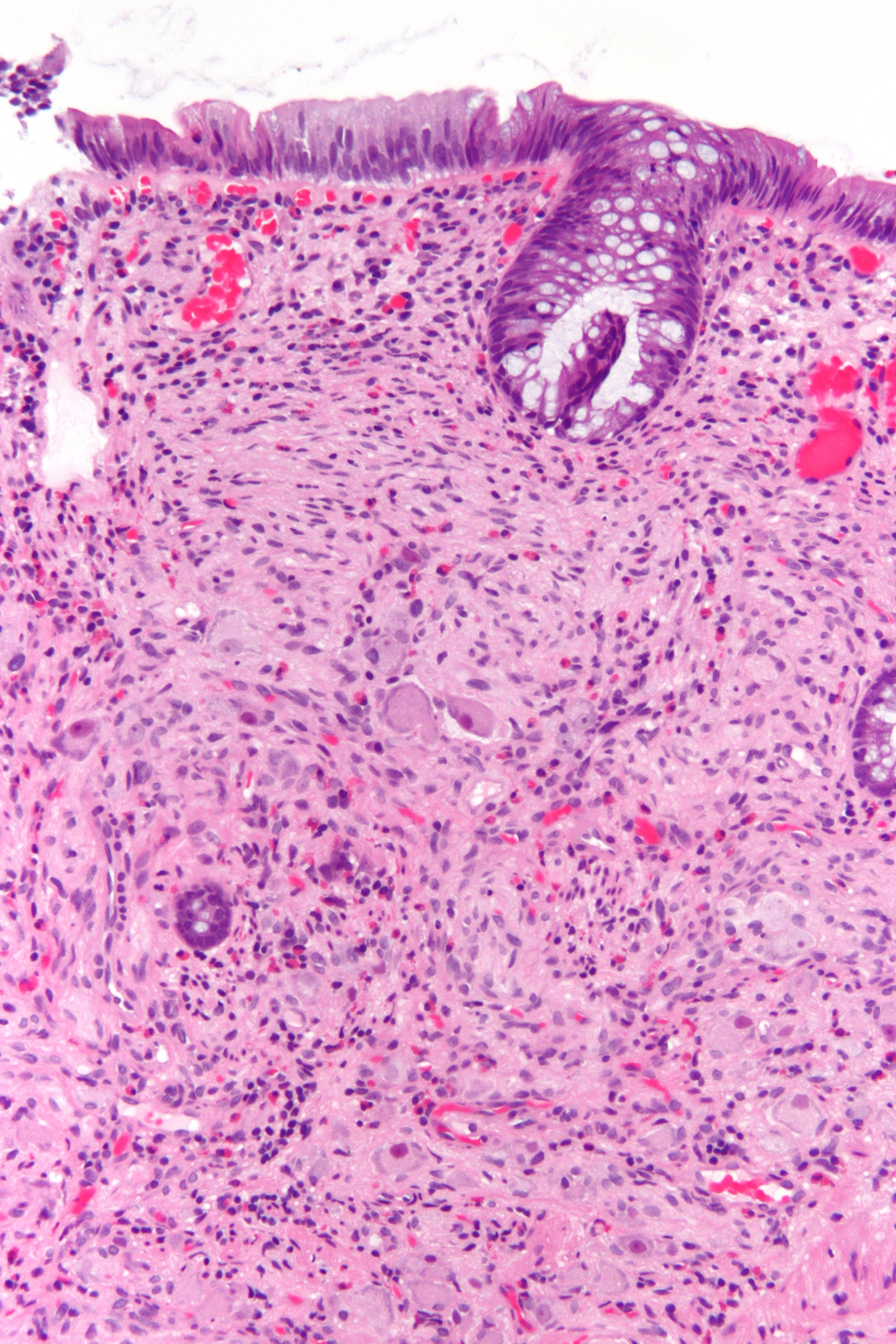
Micrograph of a ganglioneuroma with the characteristic ganglion cells. H&E stain.

Pathologically, ganglioneuromas are composed of ganglion cells, Schwann cells and fibrous tissue. Ganglioneuromas are solid, firm tumours that typically are white when seen with the naked eye.

== Diagnosis ==
Ganglioneuromas can be diagnosed visually by a CT scan, MRI scan, or an ultrasound of the head, abdomen, or pelvis. Blood and urine tests may be done to determine if the tumor is secreting hormones or other circulating chemicals. A biopsy of the tumor may be required to confirm the diagnosis.

== Treatment ==
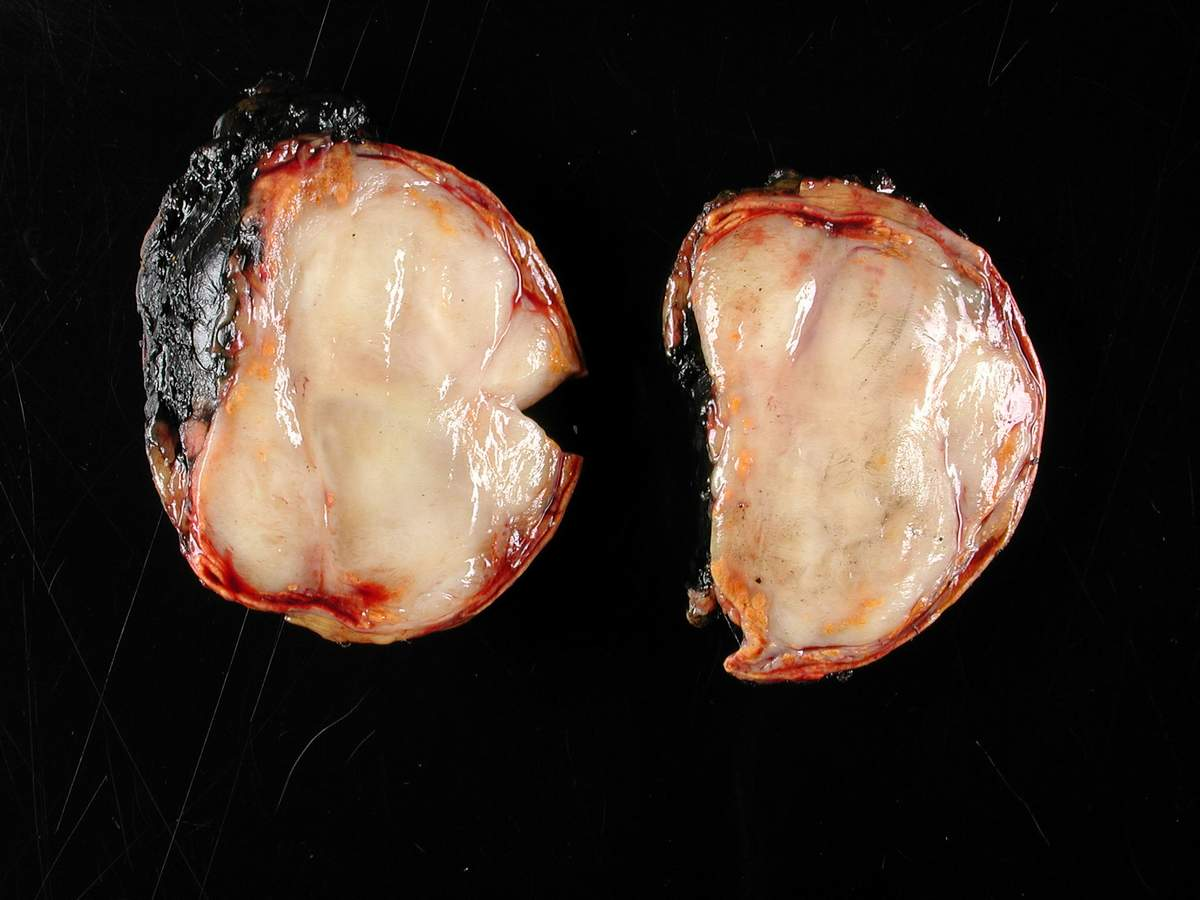
Ganglioneuroma of the adrenal gland

Because ganglioneuromas are benign, treatment may not be necessary, as it would expose patients to more risk than leaving it alone.

If there are symptoms or major physical deformity, treatment usually consists of surgery to remove the tumor.

== Prognosis ==
Most ganglioneuromas are noncancerous, thus expected outcome is usually good. However, a ganglioneuroma may become cancerous and spread to other areas, or it may regrow after removal.

If the tumor has been present for a long time and has pressed on the spinal cord or caused other symptoms, it may have caused irreversible damage that cannot be corrected with the surgical removal of the tumor. Compression of the spinal cord may result in paralysis, especially if the cause is not detected promptly.
