= George Spaeth =

American ophthalmologist

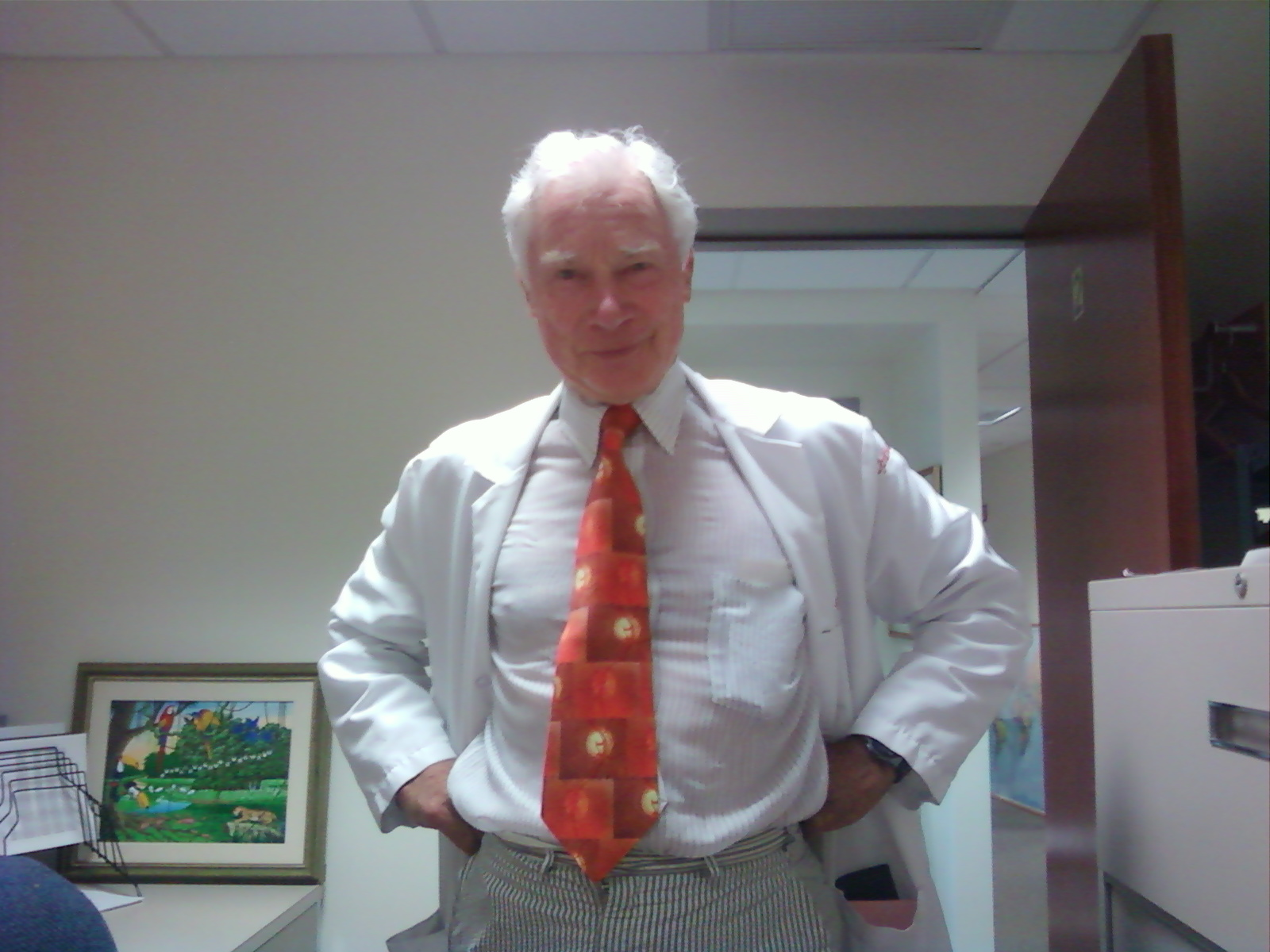
George L. Spaeth, MD

Dr. George Spaeth (born March 3, 1932, Philadelphia, Pennsylvania) is an American ophthalmologist specializing in glaucoma at Wills Eye Institute. Spaeth is also affiliated with Thomas Jefferson University Hospital, Graduate Hospital of the University of Pennsylvania, Chestnut Hill Hospital, Bryn Mawr Hospital, and Miner's Memorial Hospital.

Dr. Spaeth is considered to be one of the world's leading glaucoma specialists, with over 400 publications covering all aspects of the field. In 2010 he received the Mildred Weisenfeld Award for Excellence in Ophthalmology from the Association for Research in Vision and Ophthalmology.

He graduated with a BA from Yale College and an MD from Harvard University.
