= Carol Shields (ophthalmologist) =

American ophthalmologist

Carol Lally Shields
- Born: July 8, 1957 (age 69); Sharon, Pennsylvania
- Education: University of Notre Dame (B.S., 1979); University of Pittsburgh School of Medicine (M.D.)
- Occupation: ophthalmologist
- Known for: treatments for ocular oncology
- Spouse: Jerry A. Shields

Carol Lally Shields (born July 8, 1957) is an American ophthalmologist who is the Director of the Ocular Oncology Service at Wills Eye Hospital. She is Professor of Ophthalmology at Thomas Jefferson University and consultant at Children's Hospital of Philadelphia.

== Early life and undergraduate education ==
Shields was born Carol Lally in Sharon, Pennsylvania on July 8, 1957, graduating from Kennedy Christian High School in 1975. In 1979, she earned her undergraduate degree at the University of Notre Dame, also playing NCAA women's basketball for the "Fighting Irish." She was a member of the first basketball team at Notre Dame, and later became captain of the team. She was also the first woman to receive the Byron Kanaley Award, the highest honor given to Notre Dame student-athletes, awarded for excellence in academics and leadership. She was inducted into the Capital All-American Hall of Fame in 2011 for excellence in athletics and academics. In 2023, she received the Theodore Roosevelt Award from the NCAA.

== Medical education and career ==
Shields completed medical school at the University of Pittsburgh School of Medicine. Following graduation from medical school, she moved to Philadelphia to complete a residency at Thomas Jefferson University at Wills Eye Hospital. She then pursued fellowship training in ocular pathology (1987–1988) and ocular oncology (1988–1989), both at Wills Eye Hospital, as well as a fellowship in orbital and eyelid tumors and reconstruction at Moorfields Eye Hospital in London. After completing her training, she joined the staff at Wills Eye Hospital where she specializes in ophthalmology and eye cancers.

Shields is the coauthor (with Jerry A. Shields, her husband) of a number of texts including: Atlas of Orbital Tumors, Atlas of Intraocular Tumors, and Atlas of Eyelid and Conjunctival Tumors. She is also co-editor of a comprehensive book entitled, "Retinoblastoma", published in 2012.

Currently, Shields heads up the oncology department at the Wills Eye Hospital. Located in Philadelphia, the Wills Eye Hospital sees at least 50% of the 300 children diagnosed with retinoblastoma each year and at least 1/3 of the adults diagnosed with ocular melanoma in the USA. She was voted by her peers to be in the 2014 and 2016 Ophthalmology Top 100 Power List, which comprises a list of the top 100 most influential people in ophthalmology in the world. There have been only two "Top 100" Power Lists – she was on both. She is also the recipient of the Donders Award (2003) given by the Netherlands Ophthalmological Society every 5 years to an ophthalmologist worldwide who has contributed extensively to the field of ophthalmology. She was the first woman ever to receive this award. In 2025, Shields received the AOS Medal, an honor awarded to recognize exceptional contributions to ophthalmology.

== See also ==
- Eye neoplasm
