= Jerry A. Shields =

American ophthalmologist (1937–2025)

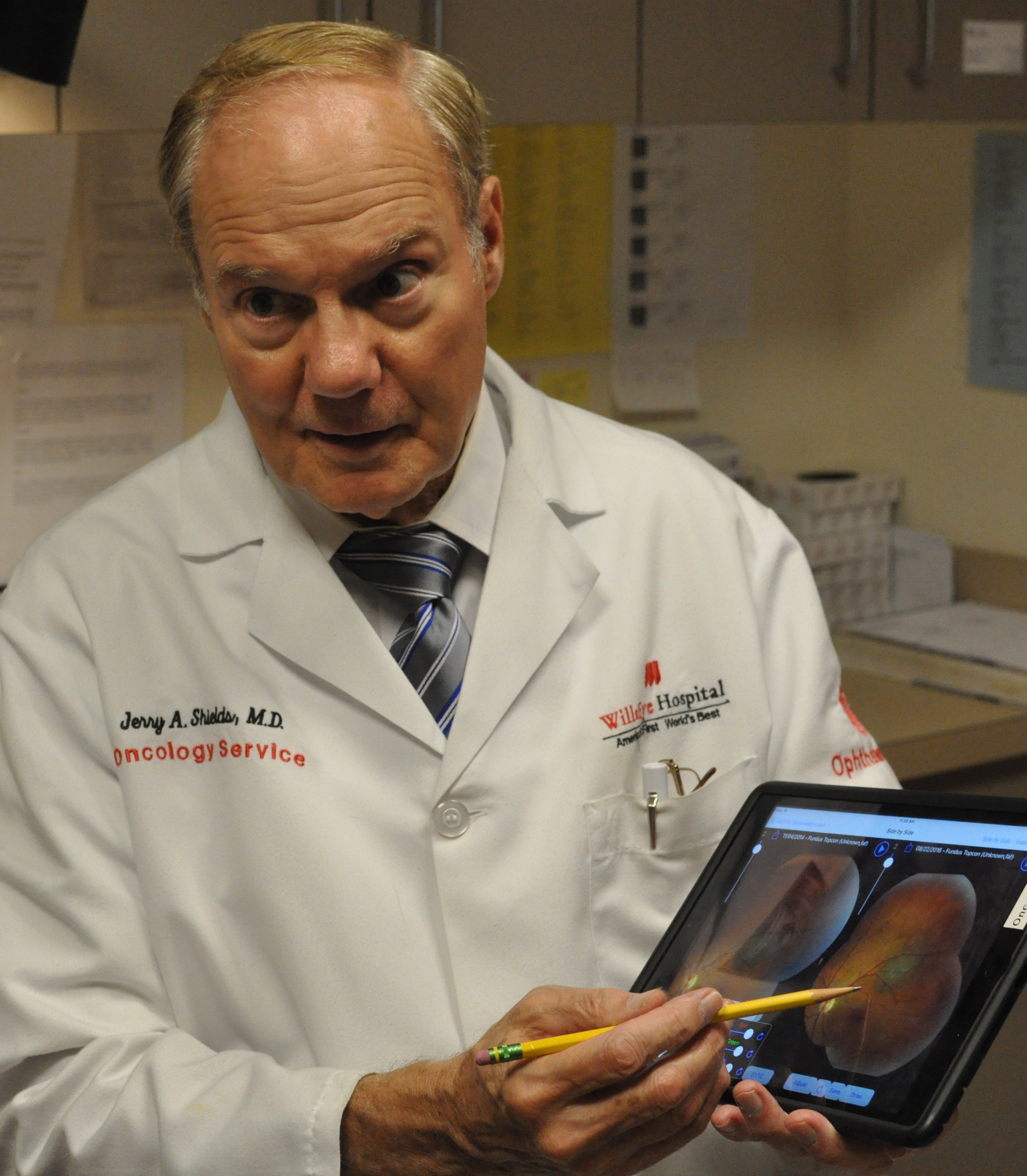
- Born: June 9, 1937
- Died: June 22, 2025 (aged 88)
- Education: Murray State University (B.S., 1960); University of Michigan Medical School, (M.D., 1964)
- Occupation: Ophthalmologist
- Known for: Ocular oncology
- Spouse: Carol Shields
- Children: 7

Jerry A. Shields (June 9, 1937 – June 22, 2025) was an American ophthalmologist practicing at the Wills Eye Institute in Philadelphia, Pennsylvania, specializing in ocular oncology. He was also a professor at Thomas Jefferson University.

== Education ==
=== Fellowship ===
- Wills Eye Hospital, Vitreoretinal Surgery, 1972, 1970
- Armed Forces Institute of Pathology, Ophthalmic Pathology, 1971

=== Residency ===
- Wills Eye Hospital, 1970

=== Medical school ===
- University of Michigan, 1964

=== Undergraduate ===
- Murray State University, 1960 - He received his Bachelor of Arts degree in Biology and was a member of Sigma Chi fraternity, Beta Beta Beta honorary society, and Who's Who.

== Career ==
After graduating from the University of Michigan Medical School, he completed a residency in ophthalmology at Wills Eye Hospital and completed post-residency fellowships in ophthalmic pathology and retinal surgery. He was part of a full-time practice devoted to tumors and pseudotumors of the eyelids, conjunctiva, intraocular structures, and orbits.

Shields' main contributions were in the treatment of malignant melanoma which affects the eyes of adults, and retinoblastoma which affects the eyes of children. With regard to melanoma, Shields and his associates improved and popularized techniques of local irradiation, local surgical resection, laser photocoagulation, and thermotherapy. With regard to retinoblastoma, they were active in improving techniques of local irradiation, laser photocoagulation, thermotherapy and chemotherapy. He also made research contributions in the diagnosis and treatment of other benign and malignant tumors, such as tumors of the ciliary body epithelium, pigment epithelium, and leiomyomas.

As of 2013, he had authored or co-authored more than 1,200 articles and textbook chapters and had authored or co-authored 13 major textbooks related to ocular tumors. He lectured widely, having given 69 named lectures.

== Death ==
Shields died on June 22, 2025, at the age of 88.

== Publications ==
- Eyelid, Conjunctival, and Orbital Tumors and Intraocular Tumors • An Atlas and Text (Two-Volume Set)
