= William Tasman =

American ophthalmologist

- Born: 1929
- Died: 2017 (aged 87–88)
- Education: Haverford College
- Spouse: Alice Tasman
- Children: 3

William Tasman (1929–2017) an American ophthalmologist, was the ophthalmologist-in-chief at Wills Eye Hospital His work had a profound impact on the treatment of retinopathy of prematurity (ROP). He served as the president of the American Academy of Ophthalmology, the president of the American Ophthalmological Society, the president of the Retina Society, the editor for Duane's Clinical Ophthalmology, and the editor for Survey of Ophthalmology,

== Early life and education ==
Born and raised in Philadelphia, Pennsylvania, Tasman attended Haverford College for an undergraduate degree. He went on receive his medical degree at the Lewis Katz School of Medicine at Temple University and subsequently did his internship at Philadelphia General Hospital. His interest in ophthalmology began when he spent a year studying ophthalmology at the University of Pennsylvania Graduate school before interrupting his education in order to serve the United States Military at the 7100th USAF Hospital in Germany. After returning from his service in 1956, he completed a residency at the Wills Eye Hospital, the medical institution where he would work for the majority of his life. His only significant break from Wills was from 1961 to 1962 when he held a retina fellowship at the Massachusetts Eye and Ear Infirmary in Boston, Massachusetts. In 1962 he returned to Philadelphia to practice ophthalmology at Wills.

== Personal life ==
In 1962, Tasman married Alice Lea Mast. The two enjoyed 55 years of marriage before his death and over the course of those years raised three children. The two were known for working as a team in order to raise money for Wills Eye as well as many other institutions. He died of congestive heart failure on March 28, 2017.

== Contributions to ophthalmology ==
=== Medical work ===
Some of his most notable contributions include advancements in the treatment of retinopathy of prematurity, retinal detachments, and diabetic retinopathy. In particular, he worked on the laser photocoagulation of threshold retinopathy of prematurity. Prior to that he assisted in writing the treatment protocol for the Cryotherapy ROP Study. David W. Parke II, the current CEO of the American Academy of Ophthalmology, told Wills Eye that “few ophthalmologists of his generation have had a more profound impact”.

=== Wills Eye ===
Since the 1970s, Tasman held many positions and committee chairmanships, the most notable of which was Ophthalmologist-in-Chief at Wills Eye, a position that he held for over 22 years. In 1980 he wrote The History of the Wills Eye Hospital and later helped create an expanded edition in 2002.

=== Other medical institutions ===
During Tasman's eight-year tenure on the American Board of Ophthalmology (ABO), he chaired the Written Examination Committee and was responsible for creating a computer bank for the Board's Written Qualifying Examination. He also served as the president of the American Academy of Ophthalmology, the American Ophthalmological Society, and the Retina Society at various times in his career.

== Awards and honors ==
Tasman was awarded the Wills Eye Hospital Alumni Society's Silver Tray Award, the College of Physicians of Philadelphia's Zentmayer Award, the American Academy of Ophthalmology's Lifetime Achievement Award, the Strittmatter Award of the Philadelphia County Medical Society, the Marshall Parks Award of the American Association for Pediatric Ophthalmology and Strabismus, the Lucien Howe Medal of the American Ophthalmological Society, the Gold Medal of the Kingdom of Saudi Arabia, the Heed Award, and the Charles Schepens Award of the Retina Society.
