= Medulloepithelioma =

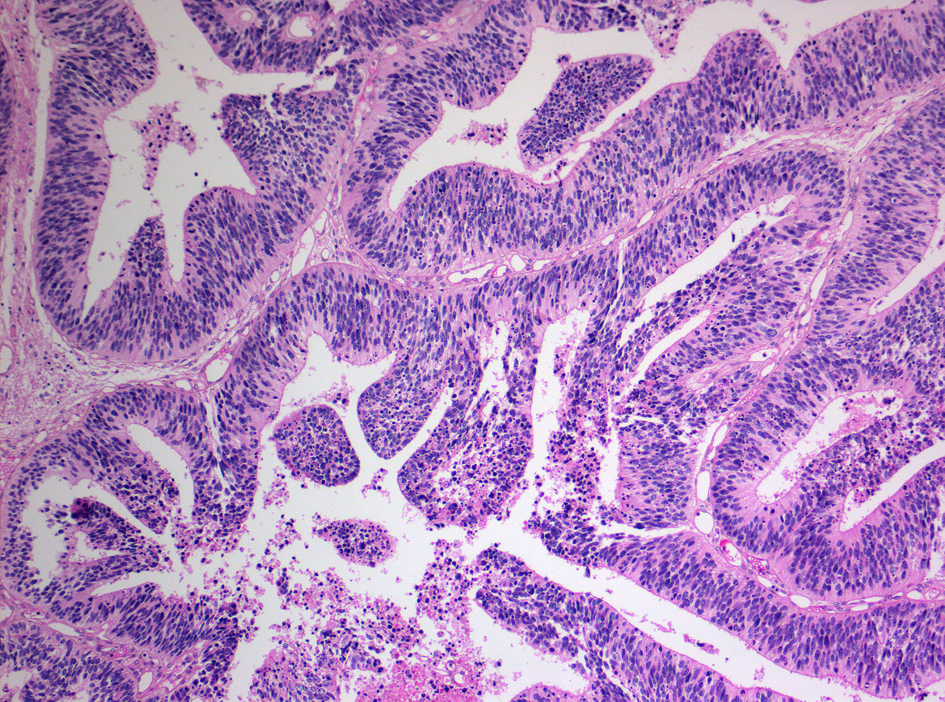
- Histopathology of medulloepithelioma showing characteristic neural tube like strands.
- Specialty: Neurosurgery, Neuro-oncology

Medulloepithelioma is a rare, primitive, fast-growing brain tumour thought to stem from cells of the embryonic medullary cavity. Tumours originating in the ciliary body of the eye are referred to as embryonal medulloepitheliomas, or diktyomas.

A highly malignant undifferentiated primitive neuroepithelial tumour of children, medulloepithelioma may contain bone, cartilage, skeletal muscle, and tends to metastasize extracranially.

== Signs and symptoms ==
Medulloepithelioma have been reported to occur in the cerebral hemispheres, brainstem, cerebellum, and peripheral sites.

Due to rapid growth of the tumour, patients typically present with increased intracranial pressure, seizures, and focal neurologic signs.

== Diagnosis ==
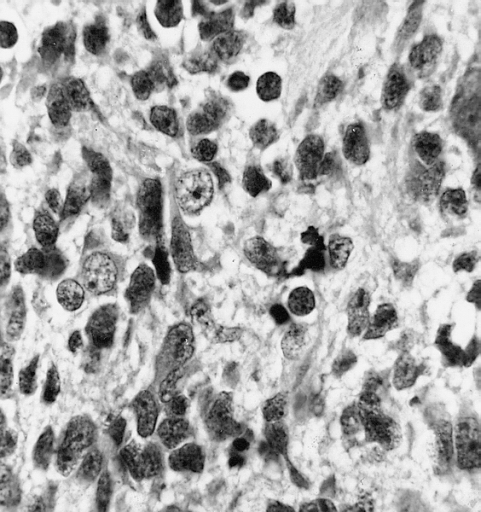
Neuronal differentiation, ranging from neuroblasts to ganglion cells, is seen in some medulloepitheliomas.

Imaging studies such as Computerized Tomography (CT) and Magnetic Resonance Imaging (MRI) can aid diagnosis. Medulloepithelioma appears isodense or hypodense with variable heterogeneity and calcification on non-contrast CT scan, and enhances with contrast. This radiographical finding is consistent with a primitive neuroectodermal tumour, especially in children. Blood studies and imaging studies of the abdomen may be used to detect metastases.

Needle aspiration biopsy can be used to aid diagnosis. Definitive diagnosis requires histopathological examination of surgically excised tumour tissues.

Histologically, medulloepithelioma resemble a primitive neural tube and with neuronal, glial and mesenchymal elements. Flexner-Wintersteiner rosettes may also be observed.

Immunohistochemically, neural tube-like structures are vimentin positive in the majority of medulloepitheliomas. Poorly differentiated medulloepitheliomas are vimentin negative.

=== Classification ===
Medulloepithelioma was originally classified as the most primitive neoplasm of the Central Nervous System (CNS) by Bailey and Cushing in 1926. Rorke et al. classified this tumour into two subtypes:

1) medulloepithelioma not otherwise specified
2) medulloepithelioma with differentiation into astrocytes, oligodendrocytes; ependymal cells; neuronal cells; others (melanin, mesenchymal cells); and mixed cellular elements.

== Treatment ==
Total resection of the tumour, followed by radiation therapy is the standard treatment modality. Medulloepithelioma of the ciliary body may necessitate enucleation of the eye. Radiation therapy alone may prolong survival. Aggressive chemotherapy with autologous bone marrow transplant is used for metastatic medulloepitheliomas.

== Prognosis ==
Medulloepithelioma carries a dismal prognosis with a median survival of 5 months.

== Epidemiology ==
Medulloepithelioma most commonly affect children between 6 months and 5 years; rarely, this tumour may occur congenitally or beyond this age range. Incidence is equal in males and females.
