= Vijay Anand Reddy =

Indian oncologist (born 1959)

Dr Vijay Anand Reddy
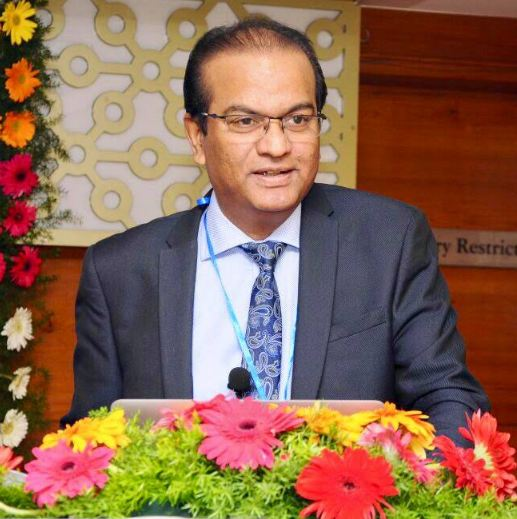
- Born: 20 October 1959 (age 66); Hyderabad, Telangana
- Occupation: Oncologist
- Known for: Eye cancer treatment Breast cancer treatment Proton therapy
- Awards: Padma Shri (2026)

Dr. Vijay Anand Reddy (born 20 October 1959) is an Indian oncologist known for his contributions to the field of cancer. He serves as the director and senior consultant oncologist at Apollo Cancer Hospital, Hyderabad. He also served as the President of Association of Radiation Oncologists of India & Chairman of Indian College of Radiation Oncology.

== Life and career ==
Reddy was born in the Hyderabad city in Telangana state. He graduated in medicine (MBBS) from the Osmania Medical College, Hyderabad in 1982. His master's degree was also obtained from the same institution in 1992. He also secured a DNB in Radiation Oncology National Board of Examinations, New Delhi.

He also served as a consultant ocular oncologist at the L.V. Prasad Eye Institute from 1998. In 2002, he was appointed as the director & senior consultant at Apollo Cancer Hospital, Hyderabad. In 2003 he founded CURE foundation for the poor so they could avail the best of cancer care.

He has served as a member on numerous prestigious committees and bodies, including the American Society of Clinical Oncology, American Society for Radiation Oncology, European Society of Medical Oncology, Union for International Cancer Control, Indian Society of Oncology and others. He has also received international fellowships from Clinical Oncology Fellowship of the Meyerstein Institute of Clinical Oncology, London; Nargis Dutt Memorial Cancer Foundation Fellowship of the New York Hospital, New York; Ocular Oncology Fellowship at Wills Eye Hospital and Children's Hospital, Philadelphia, and, Head and Neck Oncology Fellowship at Peter McCallum Cancer Institute, Melbourne.

== Honors and achievements ==
- International Cancer Research Technology Award from UICC, Geneva, Switzerland
- Nargis Dutt Memorial Foundation Award
- INTERNATIONAL CANCER RESEARCH TECHNOLOGY TRANSFER AWARD” Awarded in 1992 by UICC, Geneva, Switzerland
- Best Scientific Paper award of the National Conference of Oncologists of India in 1996
- Young Scientist award from Indo-American Cancer Congress in 1966
- International Cancer Research Technology Transfer Award of the UICC in 1998 from UICC
- 2001 Young Investigators’ Award from Eli Lilly & Company, USA.
- BEST POSTER award of the American Academy of Ophthalmology in 2008
- The Legend in the Field of Oncology” at the Times Healthcare Achievers Awards function at HICC, Hyderabad on 28th Feb’ 2017
- AOS achievement award from American Academy of Ophthalmology in January 2018

== Selected bibliography ==
- Reddy, Vijay Anand (25 August 2017). I am a Survivor: 108 Stories of Triumph Over Cancer. Penguin Random House India Private Limited. ISBN 9789386815866.
- Ali, Mohammad Javed; Honavar, Santosh G.; Reddy, Vijay Anand (2013). "Distant metastatic retinoblastoma without central nervous system involvement". Indian Journal of Ophthalmology. 61 (7): 357–359. doi:10.4103/0301-4738.97077. ISSN 1998-3689. PMC 3759110. PMID 23548316.
- Reddy, Vijay Anand; Honavar, Santosh G.; Mulay, Kaustubh; Ali, Mohammad Javed; Shah, Sneha J. (30 April 2013). "Primary Intraocular Malignant Extrarenal Rhabdoid Tumor: A Clinicopathological Correlation". Journal of Pediatric Ophthalmology and Strabismus. 50 (6): e18-20. doi:10.3928/01913913-20130423-03. ISSN 0191-3913. PMID 23614508.
- Anand P Reddy, Vijay; Mulay, Kaustubh (28 June 2013). "Adenoid cystic carcinoma of the lacrimal gland: role of nuclear survivin (BIRC5) as a prognostic marker". Histopathology. 62 (6): 840–846. doi:10.1111/his.12073. PMID 23611357. S2CID 40645730.
- Mulay, Kaustubh; Ali, Mohammad Javed; Honavar, Santosh G.; Reddy, Vijay Anand P. (2014). "Orbital alveolar soft-part sarcoma: clinico-pathological profiles, management and outcomes". Journal of Cancer Research and Therapeutics. 10 (2): 294–298. doi:10.4103/0973-1482.136570. ISSN 1998-4138. PMID 25022380.
- Manjandavida, Fairooz Puthiyapurayil; Honavar, Santosh G.; Gowrishankar, Swarnalatha; Mulay, Kaustubh; Reddy, Vijay Anand P.; Vemuganti, Geeta K. (2013). "Optic nerve meningeal hemangiopericytoma: a clinicopathologic case report". Survey of Ophthalmology. 58 (4): 341–347. doi:10.1016/j.survophthal.2012.10.001. ISSN 1879-3304. PMID 23294915.
- Ali, Mohammad Javed (2014). "Lacrimal surgery: Glorious past, exciting present era and the audacity of hope for a brilliant future". Saudi Journal of Ophthalmology. 28 (1): 1–2. doi:10.1016/j.sjopt.2013.12.005. ISSN 1319-4534. PMC 3923203. PMID 24526850.
- More, Niteen B.; Reddy, Vijay Anand P. (1 June 2012). "Radiation Oncology in 21st century – Changing the paradigms". Apollo Medicine. 9 (2): 115–125. doi:10.1016/j.apme.2012.05.006. ISSN 0976-0016.
- Ali, Mohammad Javed (2014). "Lacrimal surgery: Glorious past, exciting present era and the audacity of hope for a brilliant future". Saudi Journal of Ophthalmology. 28 (1): 1–2. doi:10.1016/j.sjopt.2013.12.005. ISSN 1319-4534. PMC 3923203. PMID 24526850.
