= Pineoblastoma =

Cancerous tumor of the pineal gland

- Other names: Pineoblastoma
- Specialty: Oncology
- Symptoms: Nausea, vomiting, headache, double vision, problems with eye movement
- Usual onset: Childhood, between the ages of 20 and 40
- Frequency: Just under half of all pineal gland tumors, which make up fewer than 1% of all primary brain tumors

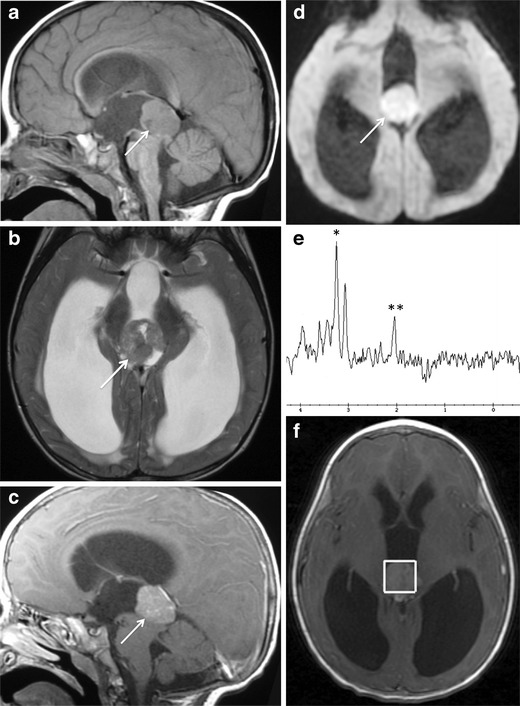
Pineoblastoma on brain imaging

Pineoblastoma is a malignant tumor of the pineal gland. A pineoblastoma is a supratentorial midline primitive neuroectodermal tumor. Pineoblastoma can present at any age, but is most common in young children. They account for 0.001% of all primary CNS neoplasms.

== Epidemiology ==
Pineoblastomas typically occur at very young ages. One study found the average age of presentation to be 4.3 years, with peaks at age 3 and 8. Another cites cases to more commonly occur in patients under 2 years of age. Rates of occurrence for males and females are similar, but may be slightly more common in females. One study found incidence of pineoblastoma to be increased in black patients compared to white patients by around 71%. This difference was most apparent in patients aged 5 to 9 years old.

== Pathophysiology ==
The pineal gland is a small organ in the center of the brain that is responsible for controlling melatonin secretion. Several tumors can occur in the area of the pineal gland, with the most aggressive being pineoblastoma. Pineoblastomas arise from embryonal cells in the pineal gland and are rapidly growing. They are considered grade 4 tumors, meaning they are malignant and may metastasize. Due to the pineal gland's location at the center of the brain and the rapidly growing nature of this disease, obstruction of CNS fluid is a common symptom.

The exact cause of pineoblastoma is unknown. MicroRNA dysregulation has been found to be associated with many cases of pineoblastoma, specifically, mutations in DICER1 and DROSHA genes. DICER1 germline mutations cause a tumor predisposition syndrome, and should be considered in patients with pineoblastoma.

Pineoblastoma may occur in patients with hereditary uni- or bilateral retinoblastoma. When retinoblastoma patients present with pineoblastoma this is characterized as "trilateral retinoblastoma". Up to 5% of patients with hereditary retinoblastoma are at risk of developing trilateral retinoblastoma. This tumor combination is more aggressive than an isolated pineoblastoma. Prognosis of patients with trilateral retinoblastoma is dismal, only a few patients have survived more than 5 years after diagnosis; all survivors were diagnosed with small tumors in a subclinical stage. Recent advances in (high-dose) chemotherapy treatment regimens and early detection have improved survival of patients with trilateral retinoblastoma to up to 50%.

Additionally, various mutations or deletions in chromosomes 1, 9, 13, 16 and 22 have been associated with pineoblastoma incidence.

== Clinical features ==
The most common symptoms to occur with pineoblastoma are headache, behavior changes, and cognitive disturbances. These masses also often cause obstructive hydrocephalus, leading to increased intracranial pressure. This can result in vision changes and Parinaud's syndrome.

Due to the aggressive nature of the disease, tumor spread at the time of diagnosis is common. Pineoblastomas often invades locally, with spread to the head and spine seen in 25–41% of patients. While CNS spread is relatively common, these tumors rarely cause distant metastases.

== Diagnosis ==
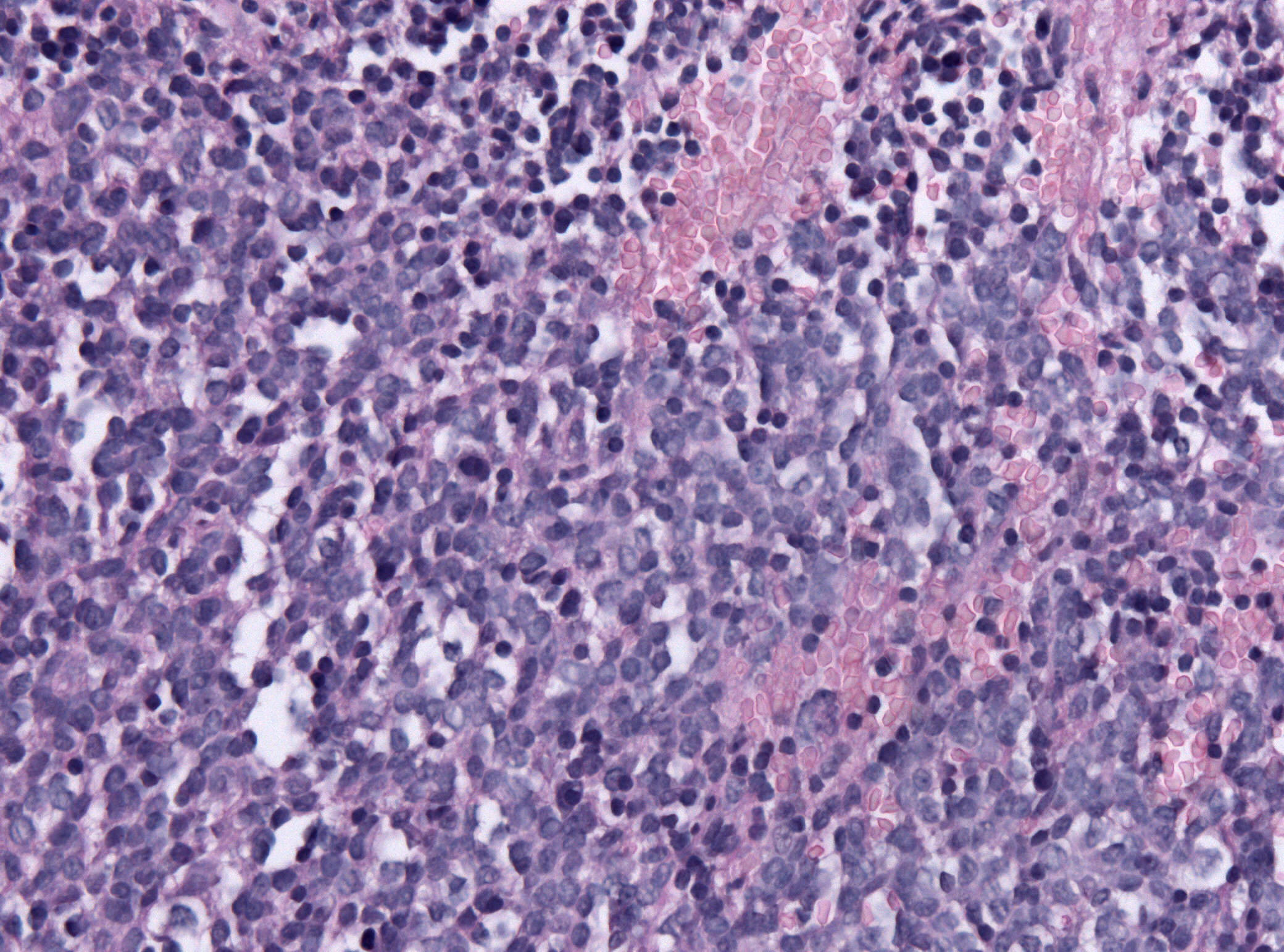
Histology of pineoblastoma

Several imaging methods can be used to diagnose pineoblastoma. Initially, urgent CTs are recommended, followed by MR imaging. CT will show large, multilobulated masses with heterogenous contrast enhancement and peripheral calcification of the pineal gland. On MRI, pineoblastomas again appear as masses with heterogenous enhancement. They often appear hypo- to isointense on T1 and slightly hyperintense on T2-weighted images. Some areas of necrosis or hemorrhage may be seen as well. PET-CT has also been used in diagnosis, and shows increased uptake of fludeoxyglucose with pineoblastomas compared to other pineal masses.

Diagnosis also requires CSF sampling via lumbar puncture to assess for cytology and tumor markers.

Biopsy is required for diagnosis. Pineoblastomas appear as high grade, highly cellular, small blue cells histologically. Features of aggressive malignancies can be seen, like high nucleus-to-cytoplasm ration, poorly differentiated cells, high mitotic activity, and necrosis. Homer Wright, or neuroblastic, and Flexner-Wintersteiner, or retinoblastic, rosettes can also be seen. In contrast to other masses of the pineal gland, pineocytomatous rosettes are not present. Immunohistochemistry staining will reveal neuronal, glial, and photoreceptor marker positivity. This includes synaptophysin, neurofilament protein, and CRX, a specific pineal or retinal marker, positive staining. Four methylation-based subtypes of pineoblastoma with clinical relevance is now recognized.

== Treatment ==
Initial treatment for pineoblastoma often includes a shunting procedure to redirect accumulated cerebrospinal fluid secondary to obstructive hydrocephalus. This shunt can help manage increased intracranial pressure and relieve some symptoms. Surgery to remove the tumor is associated with better outcomes, however, this is not always possible due to the proximity of the pineal gland to neurovascular structures. Complete tumor resection is only seen in about 30% of cases. Following surgery, radiation therapy to the brain and spinal cord can increase survival. However, radiation can only safely be used in patients over 3 years old due to the risk of significant neurological impairment. Chemotherapy treatment can also be used, either before or after surgery; its optimal use is still under investigation.

== Prognosis ==
Pineoblastomas are very aggressive tumors. 5-year survival for patients with pineoblastomas is around 58%. Prognosis for patients under 5 years old is lower, between 15 and 40%. Disseminated disease at diagnosis is also associated with worse outcomes. When pineoblastomas occur with retinoblastomas, the prognosis is typically worse, and these patients require more aggressive treatment. When stratified by molecular subtype, localized, microRNA-altered pineoblastomas are in contrast associated with superior outcome when treated with radiation and chemotherapy.

Complete gross tumor resection is associated with improved prognosis, but is difficult and rare to achieve. Radiation therapy after surgery is also linked to improved survival.
