= Trilateral retinoblastoma =

Type of brain tumor

- Other names: TRb
- Specialty: Oncology

Trilateral retinoblastoma (TRb) is a malignant midline primitive neuroectodermal tumor occurring in patients with inherited uni- or bilateral retinoblastoma. In most cases trilateral retinoblastoma presents itself as pineoblastoma (pineal TRb). In about a fourth of the cases the tumor develops in another intracranial region, most commonly supra- or parasellar (non-pineal TRb), but there are reported cases with non-pineal TRb in the 3rd ventricle. In most cases pineal TRb is diagnosed before the age of 5, but after the diagnosis of retinoblastoma. Non-pineal TRb, however, is often diagnosed simultaneous with retinoblastoma. Prognosis of patients with trilateral retinoblastoma is dismal, only a few patients have survived more than 5 years after diagnosis; all survivors were diagnosed with small tumors in a subclinical stage. Recent advances in (high-dose) chemotherapy treatment regimens and early detection have improved survival of patients with trilateral retinoblastoma.
