= Associated Services for the Blind =

American non-profit organization

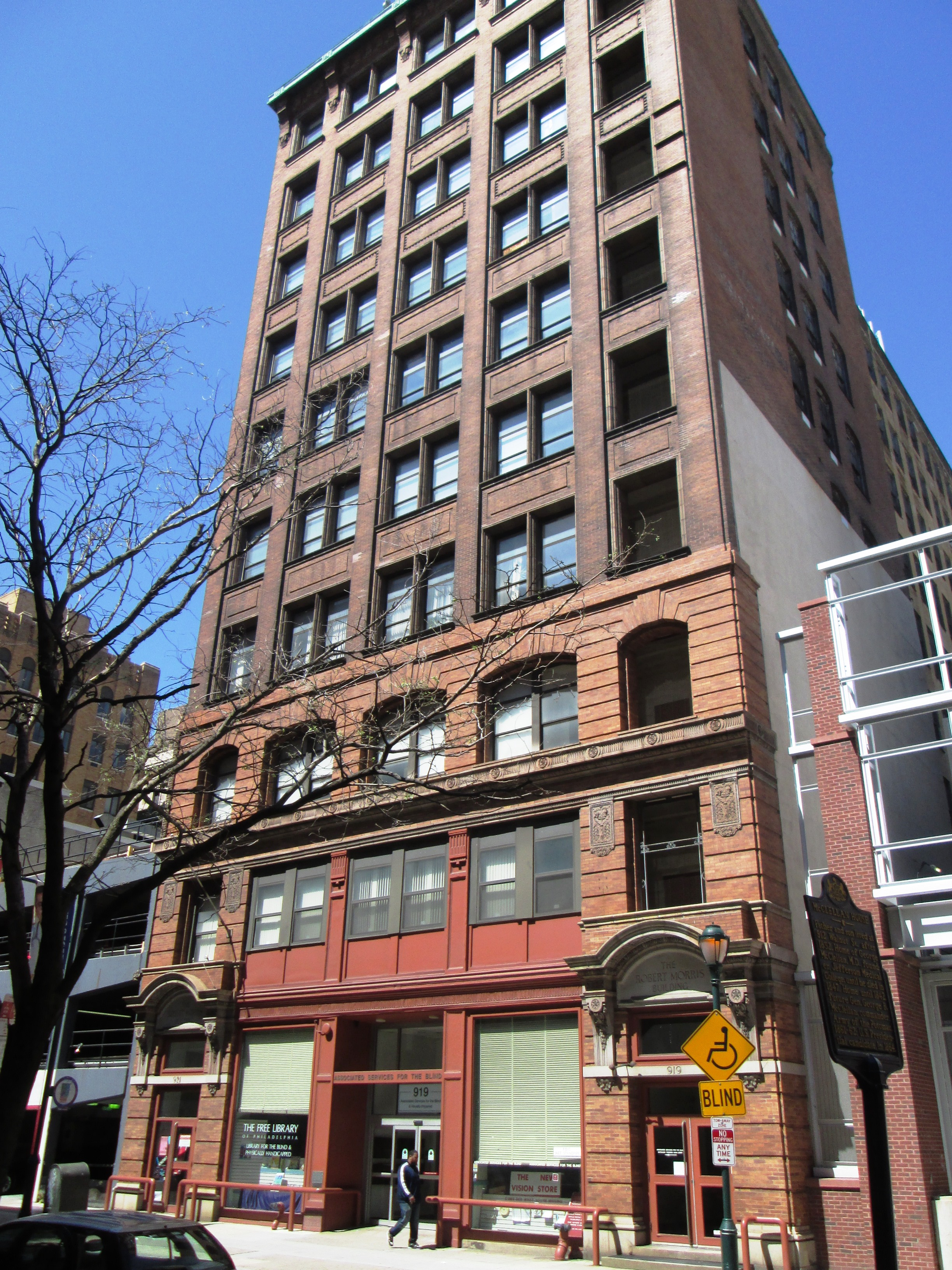
ASB has been located in the Robert Morris Building at 919 Walnut Street in Center City, Philadelphia since 1975

The Associated Services for the Blind & Visually Impaired (ASB) is a private non-profit organization in Philadelphia, Pennsylvania. It assists those living with vision loss to achieve independence through education, support services to advance necessary skills, and community connections. ASB collaborates with local, regional and national partners to provide additional resources and opportunities to clients.

Since 1975, the agency has been located in the Robert Morris Building at 919 Walnut Street in Center City, Philadelphia. Since the COVID-19 pandemic in 2020 and 2021, ASB has been providing its services remotely through both phone and online education, programming, and support.

== History ==
On November 30, 1983, three agencies – the Radio Information Center for the Blind, the Nevil Institute for Rehabilitation and Service and Volunteer Services for the Blind – merged to form Associated Services for the Blind and Visually Impaired. A lineage that began in 1874 with the Pennsylvania Working Home for Blind Men is today the largest non-profit organization in southeastern Pennsylvania serving the blind and visually impaired.

ASB has primarily been a human services agency, but up until 2020, it had also operated as a braille production facility for decades, printing books, magazines, textbooks, brochures, and other materials. With the rise of assistive and adaptive technologies and following a comprehensive strategic planning process for the agency, the board of directors made the decision to divest the braille division as of August 2020 in order to focus the nonprofit agency's resources entirely on its human services and the growing number of individuals who are experiencing vision loss.

== Services ==
ASB provides a wide range of services:

- Life Skills: ASB staff and instructors instruct program participants in home management skill building, reading and writing braille, keyboard skills and using specially adapted equipment. Specialists teach orientation and mobility techniques for safe and effective travel techniques with the aid of a cane. Clients learn to orient themselves to the community and use public transportation, for increased independence.
- Technology Training: During one-on-one training, clients use adaptive technology and software, including screen readers, mobile phone apps and smart speakers.
- Enrichment programs: ASB provides a variety of support groups as well as accessible social experiences and hands-on activities with cultural and community partners such as the Pennsylvania Ballet and Philadelphia Historical Society.
- ASB also provides support by connecting participants and learners with the appropriate resources beyond the agency that can help address a variety of issues such as healthcare and wellness, housing, employment, family and social support, financial literacy, etc.
- At-Home Resources & Support: With the closures brought on by the COVID-19 pandemic, ASB curated a schedule of virtual programming, including webinars and conference calls, activities for at-home learning, an ASB video library, and an index of city and government resources as well as regional and national nonprofits and associations that can address a variety of topics and issues.
- Philadelphia Lighthouse of the Blind: The Philadelphia Lighthouse of the Blind was founded in 1945 to provide social, cultural, and educational opportunities for people who are blind and visually impaired. Through this program, ASB can offset the cost of technological devices and adaptive aids for those who qualify.
