= Ganglioneuroblastoma =

Nerve tissue cancer surrounded by ganglion cells

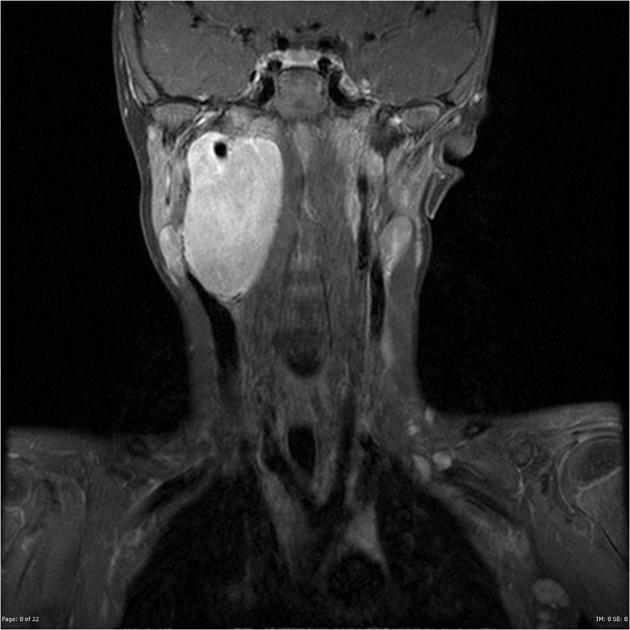
- MRI of a ganglioneuroblastoma found in the head and neck of a 7 year old Caucasian male.
- Specialty: Neuro-oncology
- Frequency: 0.0001%

Ganglioneuroblastoma is a neuroblastic tumor composed of both ganglion cells and neuroblasts. Ganglioneuroblastoma is a variant of neuroblastoma and can either be categorized as either stroma rich or stroma poor. Ganglioneuroblastomas are more commonly found in children below the age of 4 and only very rarely found in adults. There is no preference for sex as both males and females are affected equally.

Ganglioneuroblastomas are of neuroectodermal origin and can form anywhere along the peripheral sympathetic nervous system. The most common location for the neoplasm to form is in the abdomen or the adrenal glands. The tumors are generally divided into stroma rich and stroma poor categories. The stroma rich category is further divided into intermixed ganglioneuroblastoma and nodular ganglioneuroblastoma.

Ganglioneuroblastomas can be difficult to diagnose because they are often asymptomatic and are only found incidentally or when the tumor is of increased size. Ganglioneuroblastomas can be found in the body with imaging such as MRI or CT. Ganglioneuroblastomas are hypointense on T1 weighted MRI images and hyperintense on T2.

== Signs and symptoms ==
Most ganglioneuroblastomas are asymptomatic and are found only when the tumor reaches increased size or if symptoms arise due to metastasis to other areas of the body. Ganglioneuroblastomas can be large enough to compress surrounding structures in the body such as the lung causing dyspnea. Local invasion of surrounding structures including vital organs can cause pain.

Occasionally, the tumor can be active hormonally, releasing vasoactive intestinal polypeptide that causes watery diarrhea.

== Cause ==
Ganglioneuroblastomas are caused by the replication of immature neural crest cells. These cells multiple without control due to gene mutations and form tumors in the peripheral sympathetic nervous system.

== Pathology ==
Adrenal Ganglioneuroblastoma under medium power microscopy.

Ganglioneuroblastomas are believed to arise from mutations that occur at the gene level. The genetics of ganglioneuroblastomas is not fully understood, however, some have been linked to mutations in the ALK gene. Ganglioneuroblastomas are made up of ganglion cells and neural crest cells. The cells can grow to make ovoid or large multiloculated tumors with some areas of calcification.

== Diagnosis ==
The most common way that a tumor is diagnosed is through the use of imaging to find the location of the tumor, followed by a biopsy of the tumor for histological examination. Histology and the use of special stains such as S100, synaptophysin, chromogranin, and ALK1 can be helpful in identification.

== Treatment ==
Surgery is the mainstay treatment of ganglioneuroblastomas and can always be considered. Low risk tumors may only need to be treated by surgery alone. High risk tumors may require the use of chemotherapy and radiation.

Most ganglioneuroblastomas are not detected until after they have metastasized which requires higher levels of treatment.

== Prognosis ==
The International Neuroblastoma Staging System can be used to evaluate prognostic factors as either favorable or unfavorable. Neuroblastic tumors, which include ganglioneuroblastomas, that occur in patients less than 18 months is a favorable prognostic factor. If the patient is older than 18 months then this is an unfavorable factor.

Other factors to consider include stage, histology, and genetic makeup of the tumor.

== Neuroblastic tumors ==
It is contained within the neuroblastic tumors group, which includes:

- Ganglioneuroma (benign)
- Ganglioneuroblastoma (intermediate).
- Neuroblastoma (aggressive)

== See also ==
- Neuroblastoma
