= Band of Parents =

American nonprofit organization

- Formation: 2007
- Founder: Parents of children with neuroblastoma
- Type: Non-profit organization
- Legal status: 501(c)(3) charitable organization
- Purpose: Funding research and treatment for neuroblastoma
- Headquarters: New York City, U.S.
- Region served: United States
- Website: www.bandofparents.org

The Band of Parents is a 501(c)(3) nonprofit organization. Formed in July 2007 and incorporated in October 2007, it was founded by approximately 100 parents of young children with neuroblastoma who were treated at Memorial Sloan Kettering Cancer Center (MSKCC). It main aim is to fund the development of new therapies for neuroblastoma that would not otherwise be pursued by research institutions or the pharmaceutical industry. The organization has become the largest single funder of neuroblastoma research at MSKCC.

== Neuroblastoma ==
Neuroblastoma is a form of childhood cancer that can develop at any age but typically presents between the ages of 18 months and five years. It affects a little over 600 children per year in the United States. Most are diagnosed with stage IV disease, the most advanced form. Even with aggressive therapy, stage IV neuroblastoma carries a poor prognosis, with a three-year survival rate of 30–40%.

Compared with other types of cancer, neuroblastoma is rare. Scientific advances have allowed the development of individualized treatments, with techniques such as immunotherapy being targeted to specific kinds of cancer. However, because of the rising cost of drug development, which is approaching $1 billion, pharmaceutical companies are not likely to develop drugs that are specific to neuroblastoma or other rare disorders.

== Projects ==
The Band of Parents' first project was the development of a humanized antibody, Hu3F8.

In addition to surgery, chemotherapy and radiation, many neuroblastoma patients at MSKCC were treated with a murine (mouse-derived) monoclonal antibody called 3F8. Given intravenously, 3F8 binds specifically to neuroblastoma cells and triggers an immune response, which destroys the cancerous cells. Because the antibody also binds to peripheral nerve cells, the treatment is painful, but it is generally without long-term complications. However, its use is limited by the body's eventual development of human anti-murine antibody, which neutralizes the effects. The Band of Parents raised $2–$3 million to fund the genetic engineering of the murine cell line that produces 3F8 so that it would produce a new antibody, Hu3F8, using human genes. Hu3F8 has the same benefits as 3F8, but because it is 98% human, it does not cause a neutralizing immune response. In theory, this should allow patients to be treated with it indefinitely.

In March 2013, the Band of Parents led a group of nonprofit organizations in providing a $2 million grant to MSKCC to fund the development of a bispecific monoclonal antibody targeting neuroblastoma.

The organization's other projects have included the Loneliest Road Campaign, a 3,000-mile, 19-day bicycle ride across the US by six fathers of children in active treatment; a bake sale with cookies made by the children, their families and supporters; and The BoP Shop, an online store featuring artwork by children with neuroblastoma.

In 2012, the Band of Parents began an annual gala event called the Evening of Hope, which has become its primary fundraiser.

== See also ==
- Help Fight Childhood Cancer
- Solving Kids' Cancer UK
- The Neuroblastoma Society
