= Solving Kids' Cancer UK =

British children's cancer charity

- Formation: 27 April 2006; 20 years ago
- Type: Charity
- Chief Executive: Gail Jackson
- Chair of Trustees: Nick Bird
- Staff: 15 FTEs (2024)
- Website: https://www.solvingkidscancer.org.uk
- Formerly called: Neuroblastoma Children's Cancer Alliance UK (NCAA UK)

Solving Kids' Cancer UK is a charity in the United Kingdom that supports children and families affected by neuroblastoma, a type of childhood cancer. The organisation assists families in accessing and fundraising for treatment abroad when suitable options are unavailable in the UK, provides support, and funds research into the disease. It was known as Neuroblastoma Children’s Cancer Alliance UK until October 2015.

== History ==
The charity was established in April 2006 as the 2Simple Trust. The charity initially had broad aims, but the trustees decided to focus on helping children with neuroblastoma after learning about the potential to save children's lives from a parent, Yvonne Brown, whose son Jack was diagnosed with the disease. Although Jack Brown received pioneering treatment abroad through funds raised by his family, he died in 2009. The charity continued its work with families affected by neuroblastoma and, by January 2013, had funded treatment abroad for 21 children.

In 2011, it was rebranded as the Neuroblastoma Children's Cancer Alliance UK (often abbreviated to NCCA UK), and in 2015 the name was changed to Solving Kids' Cancer UK.

The charity was criticised by far-right English Defence League leader Tommy Robinson in 2013 after refusing a £6,000 donation, stating that it did not accept political contributions.

As of 2025, the charity's patrons are actors Natalie Cassidy and Rob Brydon, and businessman Carl Cavers, co-founder of the video game developer Sumo Digital. In the 2025 New Year's Honours, the chair of trustees, Nick Bird, was appointed MBE for services to paediatric oncology patients and research advocacy.

== Activities ==
=== Financial assistance ===
The charity helps families access and fundraise for their child's treatment abroad. Various new treatments for neuroblastoma are being trialled in the UK, but if children do not meet the criteria for a trial, or need treatment that is only available abroad, families have to pay for their child's treatment abroad.

The costs of treatment abroad vary from around £80,000 for treatment in Germany to more than £300,000 for treatment in the United States.

The charity has a number of appeals for children that are fundraising to receive treatment abroad. Some of the families supported by the charity have attracted high-profile media and celebrity support for their fundraising campaigns.

=== Support for families ===
The charity helps families affected by neuroblastoma by putting them in touch with other families that have gone through a similar situation. It also holds events for parents so they can meet other families and learn more about advances in research and treatment.

=== Research ===
The charity has funded research, including a project at University College Hospital, London, which aims to improve radiation treatments for patients with neuroblastoma.

== See also ==
- Neuroblastoma Society
- Help Fight Childhood Cancer
- Band of Parents
- Young Lives vs Cancer
- Children with Cancer UK
- Blood Cancer UK

General:

- Cancer in the United Kingdom
