= NDRG1 =

Protein-coding gene in the species Homo sapiens

Identifiers
- Aliases: NDRG1, CAP43, CMT4D, DRG-1, DRG1, GC4, HMSNL, NDR1, NMSL, PROXY1, RIT42, RTP, TARG1, TDD5, N-myc downstream regulated 1
- External IDs: OMIM: 605262; MGI: 1341799; GeneCards: NDRG1

Gene location (Human)
Chr.	Chromosome 8 (human)
Band	8q24.22	Start	133,237,175 bp
Band	8q24.22	End	133,302,022 bp

Gene location (Mouse)
Chr.	Chromosome 15 (mouse)
Band	15|15 D2	Start	66,801,167 bp
Band	15|15 D2	End	66,841,489 bp
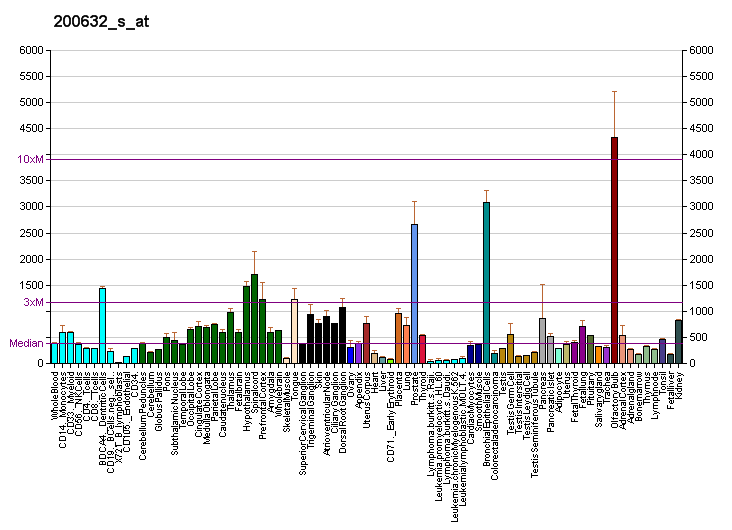
RNA expression pattern
Bgee	Human / Mouse (ortholog); Top expressed in: olfactory bulb; internal globus pallidus; tibial nerve; corpus callosum; inferior olivary nucleus; skin of abdomen; inferior ganglion of vagus nerve; trigeminal ganglion; skin of leg; C1 segment / Top expressed in: sciatic nerve; epithelium of lens; human kidney; migratory enteric neural crest cell; right kidney; proximal tubule; suprachiasmatic nucleus; utricle; ciliary body; iris; More reference expression data
BioGPS	More reference expression data
Gene ontology
Molecular function	microtubule binding; cadherin binding; protein binding; gamma-tubulin binding
Cellular component	cytoplasm; centrosome; membrane; microtubule cytoskeleton; myelin sheath; plasma membrane; microtubule organizing center; recycling endosome membrane; perinuclear region of cytoplasm; microtubule; extracellular exosome; cytoskeleton; nucleus; cytosol; glutamatergic synapse
Biological process	mast cell activation; peripheral nervous system myelin maintenance; DNA damage response, signal transduction by p53 class mediator; response to metal ion; positive regulation of spindle checkpoint; regulation of cell population proliferation; cellular response to hypoxia; negative regulation of cell population proliferation; regulation of apoptotic process; signal transduction; postsynapse organization
Sources:Amigo / QuickGO
Orthologs
Databases	NCBI: entry; OMA: entry
Species	Human	Mouse
Entrez	10397	17988
Ensembl	ENSG00000104419	ENSMUSG00000005125
UniProt	Q92597	Q62433
RefSeq (mRNA)	NM_001135242; NM_001258432; NM_001258433; NM_006096; NM_001374844 NM_001374845; NM_001374846; NM_001374847	NM_008681
RefSeq (protein)	NP_001128714; NP_001245361; NP_001245362; NP_006087; NP_001361773 NP_001361774; NP_001361775; NP_001361776	NP_032707
Location (UCSC)	Chr 8: 133.24 – 133.3 Mb	Chr 15: 66.8 – 66.84 Mb
PubMed search
- Wikidata
View/Edit Human	View/Edit Mouse

Protein NDRG1 is a protein that in humans is encoded by the NDRG1 gene.

This gene is a member of the N-myc downregulated gene family which belongs to the alpha/beta hydrolase superfamily. The protein encoded by this gene is a cytoplasmic protein involved in stress responses, hormone responses, cell growth, and differentiation.

== Gene ==
In humans, NDRG1 gene is located on the long arm of chromosome 8 (8q24.22). The gene is transcribed to a 3.0 kilobases (kb) messenger RNA (mRNA) encoding 394 amino acids. NDRG1 belong to the NDRG1 family consisting of four members - NDRG1, NDRG2, NDRG3 and NDRG4 - that share a 53-65 % homology. In contrast to other family members, NDRG1 has a three tandem repeats (GTRSRSHTSE) in the C-terminal part.

The expression of NDRG1 is regulated by hypoxia dependent and independent manner. Under hypoxia the oxygen sensor hypoxia-inducible factor (HIF)-1α is translocated from cytoplasm to nucleus, where binds to HIF-1β to form HIF-1 complex. This complex works as a transcription factor, binds to hypoxia response element (HRE) in the promoter of hypoxia-related genes, one of these genes is the NDRG1. Also heavy metal ions (nickel, cobalt, iron) upregulate NDRG1 by mimicking hypoxia. Opposite effect on NDRG1 expression could have myc oncoproteins, N-myc and c-myc, which transcriptionally repress the expression. These effect is mediated indirectly by decreasing its promoter activity.

== Structure ==
NDRG1, along with NDRG2, NDRG3, and NDRG4 are members of the NDRG protein family that all contain a core α/β hydrolase fold region. NDRG1 also contains an N-terminal disordered region and a distinctive C-terminal three tandem 10‑residue repeat region each of which binds metals. The core α/β hydrolase region of NDRG1 also contains a phosphopantetheine attachment site.

== Function ==
NDRG1 is involved in embryogenesis and development, cell growth and differentiation, lipid biosynthesis and myelination, stress responses, immunity, DNA repair and cell adhesion among other functions. NDRG1 is localised in the cytoplasm, nucleus and mitochondrion, at probabilities of 47.8%, 26.1% and 8.7%, respectively. In response to DNA damage NDRG1 translocates from the cytoplasm to the nucleus, where it may inhibit cell growth and promote DNA repair mechanisms. It is suggested that NDRG1 acts as a stress response gene or potentially as a transcription factor.

It has been reported that NDRG1 localizes to the endosomes and is a Rab4a effector involved in vesicular recycling.

=== DNA repair and aging ===
In one of its functions at a molecular level, NDRG1 binds and stabilizes methyltransferases, chiefly O-6-methylguanine-DNA methyltransferase (MGMT), a DNA repair protein. Thus, higher expression of NDRG1 can promote MGMT protein stability and activity. Dominick et al. showed NDRG1 and MGMT protein expression was increased by 2-fold to 3-fold for each of three strains of mice (Snell, GHKRO, and PAPPA-KO) with increased longevity. These authors strongly suggest a link between the increase in the MGMT DNA repair pathway and a delay in the aging process in these mouse strains. This is consistent with the DNA damage theory of aging.

=== Immune system ===
The NDRG1 plays an important role in allergy and anaphylaxis, defence against bacterial pathogens and bacterial clearance, inflammation and wound healing. In mast cells, NDRG1 is upregulated during maturation and helps to rapid degranulation, which leads to enhanced exocytosis in response to various stimuli. Also was shown its role in T-cell clonal anergy downstream of Egr2, where NDRG1 is upregulated in the absence of costimulation to inhibit subsequent re-activation of T cells by TCR and CD28 signaling.

== Clinical significance ==
=== Charcot-Marie-Tooth disease ===
Mutations in this gene have been reported to be causative the autosomal-recessive version of Charcot-Marie-Tooth disease known as CMT4D.

=== Cancer ===
NDRG1 plays a dual role in breast cancer. NDRG1 was first to be known as tumor suppressor, but ongoing evidence suggested that NDRG1 could promote cancer cell proliferation, invasion, migration, and brain metastasis. As reviewed by Kovacevic et al., NDRG1 is a potent, iron-regulated growth and metastasis suppressor that was found to be negatively correlated with cancer progression in a number of tumors, including prostate, pancreatic, breast, and colon cancers. NDRG1 has marked anti-oncogenic activity, being associated with decreased cell proliferation, migration, invasion, and angiogenesis. The molecular functions of NDRG1 affect numerous signaling pathways that regulate cancer cell proliferation, invasion, angiogenesis, and migration. Specifically, NDRG1 inhibits the oncogenic RAS, c-Src, phosphatidylinositol 3-kinase (PI3K), WNT, ROCK1/pMLC2, and nuclear factor-light chain enhancer of activated B cell (NF-B) pathways, while promoting expression of key tumor-suppressive molecules including phosphatase and tensin homolog, E-cadherin, and mothers against decapentaplegic homolog 4 (SMAD4). Through its effects on E-cadherin and beta-catenin, which form the adherens junction and promote cell adhesion, NDRG1 also inhibits the epithelial to mesenchymal transition, an initial key step in metastasis.
