= CFAP263 =

Protein-coding gene in humans

Identifiers
- Aliases: CFAP263, HSPC065, coiled-coil domain containing 113, CCDC113, Cilia and flagella associated protein 263
- External IDs: OMIM: 616070; MGI: 3606076; GeneCards: CFAP263

Gene location (Human)
Chr.	Chromosome 16 (human)
Band	16q21	Start	58,231,157 bp
Band	16q21	End	58,283,836 bp

Gene location (Mouse)
Chr.	Chromosome 8 (mouse)
Band	8|8 D1	Start	96,260,713 bp
Band	8|8 D1	End	96,285,518 bp
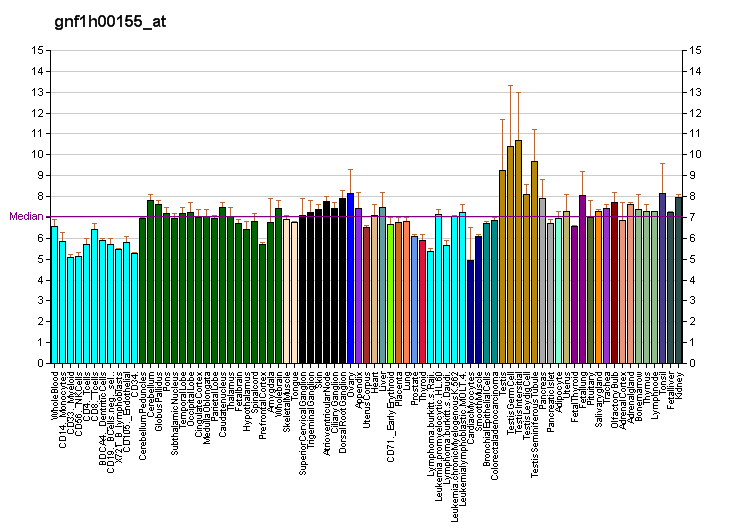
RNA expression pattern
Bgee	Human / Mouse (ortholog); Top expressed in: bronchial epithelial cell; mucosa of paranasal sinus; right uterine tube; endothelial cell; epithelium of nasopharynx; trachea; middle temporal gyrus; Brodmann area 23; caput epididymis; olfactory zone of nasal mucosa / Top expressed in: choroidal fissure; spermatid; spermatocyte; seminiferous tubule; neural layer of retina; choroid plexus of fourth ventricle; olfactory epithelium; Epithelium of choroid plexus; morula; embryo; More reference expression data
BioGPS	More reference expression data
Gene ontology
Molecular function	protein binding
Cellular component	microtubule organizing center; centriolar satellite; cytoskeleton; cytoplasm; nucleoplasm; cytosol; protein-containing complex
Biological process	cell projection organization; cilium assembly
Sources:Amigo / QuickGO
Orthologs
Databases	NCBI: entry; OMA: entry
Species	Human	Mouse
Entrez	29070	244608
Ensembl	ENSG00000103021	ENSMUSG00000036598
UniProt	Q9H0I3	Q8C5T8
RefSeq (mRNA)	NM_001142302; NM_014157	NM_172914
RefSeq (protein)	NP_001135774; NP_054876	NP_766502
Location (UCSC)	Chr 16: 58.23 – 58.28 Mb	Chr 8: 96.26 – 96.29 Mb
PubMed search
- Wikidata
View/Edit Human	View/Edit Mouse

Cilia- and flagella-associated protein 263 is a protein that in humans is encoded by the CFAP263 gene (previously CCDC113). The CFAP263 protein is involved in cilium assembly as part of the centriolar satellites, and is part of a protein complex that regulates ciliary beating.

== Gene ==
CCDC113 is located on chromosome 16q21 and encodes two distinct isoforms with isoform 2 containing one less alternate in-frame exon compared to the full length protein, isoform 1. Isoform 1 is composed of 5304 base pairs of mRNA which form the 9 exons that make up the coding sequence.

CCDC113, located between nucleotides 58283840 and 58317740 on chromosome 16, is surrounded between antisense genes PRSS54 and CSNK2A2 and downstream from GINS3 and NDRG4 on the sense strand. PRSS54 is a trypsin-like serine protease which codes for the inactive serine protease 54 precursor. CSNK2A2 the casein kinase 2, alpha prime polypeptide contains a protein kinase domain and a catalytic domain. GINS3 is essential for the initiation of DNA replication and replisome progression in eukaryotes. NDRG4 a member of the N-myc downregulated gene family belonging to the alpha/beta hydrolase superfamily which encodes a cytoplasmic protein responsible for cell cycle progression and survival in primary astrocytes and may be involved in regulation of mitogenic signaling in vascular smooth muscle cells.

== Homology ==
=== Paralogs ===
CCDC113 has one known paralog CCDC96 which has a query cover of 27% and a max identity value of 34%.

Name	Species	Species Common Name	NCBI Accession Number	Length	Protein Identity
CCDC113	Homo sapiens	Human	NP_054876.2	377aa	100%
CCDC96	Homo sapiens	Human	NP_699207.1	555aa	34%

=== Homologs ===
CCDC113 is highly conserved in all mammals and in organisms diverging back to Zebrafish, Danio rerio.

Species	Species common name	NCBI Accession Number (mRNA/Protein)	Length (bp/aa)	Protein Identity
Homo sapiens	Human	NM_014157.3 / NP_054876.2	5304bp/377aa	100%
Pan troglodytes	Chimpanzee	XM_523504.4/ / XP_523504.2	5269bp/377aa	99%
Mus musculus	Mouse	NM_172914.2 / NP_766502.1	1271bp/377aa	78%
Felis catus	Cat	XM_003998086.1 / 410983617	1252bp/323aa	69%
Xenopus (Silurona) tropicalis	Western Clawed Frog	XM_002931657.1 / 301604136	1395bp/441aa	43%
Danio rerio	Zebrafish	NM_001006061.1 / NP_001006061.1	1154bp/358aa	38%

== Protein ==
The CCDC113 protein is composed of 377 amino acids which form a secondary structure composed primarily of alpha-helices. This protein contains a domain of unknown function DUF4201. There are many predicted post-translational modifications including phosphorylation, N-terminal acetylation, sumoylation, and N-glycosylation.

=== Function ===
The function of CCDC113 is currently unknown.

=== Expression ===
CCDC 113 is expressed at low levels in nearly all tissues of the body by RNA-seq including blood, lymph node, brain, heart, skeletal muscle, kidney, liver, colon, lung, thyroid, prostate, ovary, breast, adrenal gland, and adipocyte. The gene is also expressed in embryonic tissues and stem cells. There are high levels of expression in the cerebellum and in the testis and surrounding tissues.

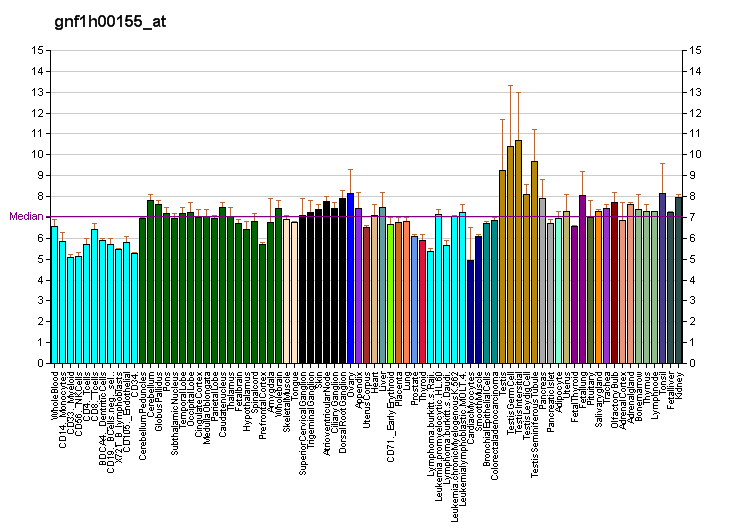
CCDC113 expression in human tissues.

=== Interactions ===
Regulatory elements of CCDC113 include transcription factors ATF2, FOXD1, LCR-F1, C/EBPalpha, Max, AREB6, CBF-A, CBF(2), c-Myc, and HIF.

Interacting proteins found using two-hybrid screening techniques include GIT1; a G protein-coupled receptor kinase interacting ArfGAP, the cytoplasmic protein HAP1; Huntingtin-associated protein 1, IMMT, an inner mitochondrial membrane protein, and PFN2; Profilin 2- ubiquitous actin monomer binding protein.

=== Clinical significance ===
Studies have linked expression of CCDC113 in cancerous tissues to mutations present in the coding sequence. Missense mutations at location 86 from Arginine to Tryptophan (R86Y) and at R180C are related to adenocarcinomas of the colon. Two point mutations have also been linked to adenocarcinomas of the rectum, a missense mutation of R361Q and a base pair point mutation c972t. Serous carcinoma of the ovaries has been related to a missense mutation S6F.
