= Young Lives vs Cancer =

British charity (formed 2005)

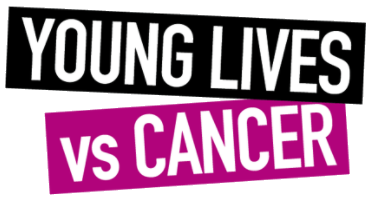
- Formation: 2005; 21 years ago
- Merger of: Cancer and Leukaemia in Childhood (CLIC), Sargent Cancer Care for Children
- Type: Registered Charity
- VAT ID no.: 863639196
- Registration no.: 1107328 (England & Wales), SC039857 (Scotland)
- Legal status: Charity
- Headquarters: 4th Floor, Whitefriars, Lewins Mead, Bristol, BS1 2NT
- Location: United Kingdom
- Chief Executive: Rachel Kirby-Rider
- Website: younglivesvscancer.org.uk
- Formerly called: CLIC Sargent

Young Lives vs Cancer, the operating name for "CLIC Sargent", is a charity in the United Kingdom formed in 2005. Young Lives vs Cancer is the 12th largest cancer charity in the UK with a focus on children, young people and their families. Its care teams provide specialist support across the UK.

Young Lives vs Cancer supports people from diagnosis onwards and aims to help the whole family deal with the impact of cancer and its treatment, life after treatment and, in some cases, bereavement.

The charity also undertakes research into the impact of cancer on children and young people. It uses this evidence to raise awareness and to seek to influence government and policy-makers, and those who provide public services across the UK.

== History ==
CLIC Sargent was formed in 2005 after a successful merger between Cancer and Leukaemia in Childhood (CLIC) and Sargent Cancer Care for Children. Sargent was set up in 1967 in memory of conductor Sir Malcolm Sargent who died of cancer.

The charity began operating under a new name - "Young Lives vs Cancer" - in May 2021, the tagline already in use by the charity.

== Chief executive ==
Young Lives vs Cancer's chief executive is Rachel Kirby-Rider, who took over from Kate Lee in March 2020. Rachel Kirby-Rider had previously worked for the organisation as the Director of Income and Engagement for 5 years before being appointed.

== Awareness and fundraising ==
Young Lives vs Cancer's main fundraising and awareness event is Childhood Cancer Awareness Month in September. People also fundraise through runs, cycles and other events.

== Services ==
The charity provides 'Homes from home', which are buildings with free accommodation for child and young people are their families. They are located near treatment centers and aim to help lift the burden of travel, food and accommodation costs.

== Ambassadors ==
- James Allen
- Alice Beer
- Angellica Bell
- Nicola Benedetti
- Mark Chapman
- Chris Hollins
- Emma Johnson
- Julian Lloyd Webber
- Patsy Palmer
- Gaby Roslin
- Kai Owen
- Michelle Ryan
- Richard Young
- Susan Young
- Duncan Pow
- Jake Humphrey
- Ben Cajee

== Corporate partners ==
Corporate partners currently working with Young Lives vs Cancer:

- Credo Asset Finance
- Crerar Hotels
- Dell
- Johnson Matthey
- London Steakhouse co.
- Lidl (Northern Ireland)
- Metcalfe's Food Company
- MFS Investment Management
- Manchester Airports Group
- One Stop Stores Ltd
- Partylite UK
- Sequence
- Signet Jewelers
- Scentsy
- BAM Construct UK
- TC facilities management
- Wallis (retailer)
- Wetherspoons
- Winplus Europe
- Zurich Community Trust

Previous corporate partners include, ITV's Text Santa, Morrisons, Tesco, Chelsea F.C., HMV and Virgin Trains West Coast.

Colas Rail and Virgin Trains West Coast named 60087 and 390047 respectively as CLIC Sargent in support of the charity.

== Gallery ==
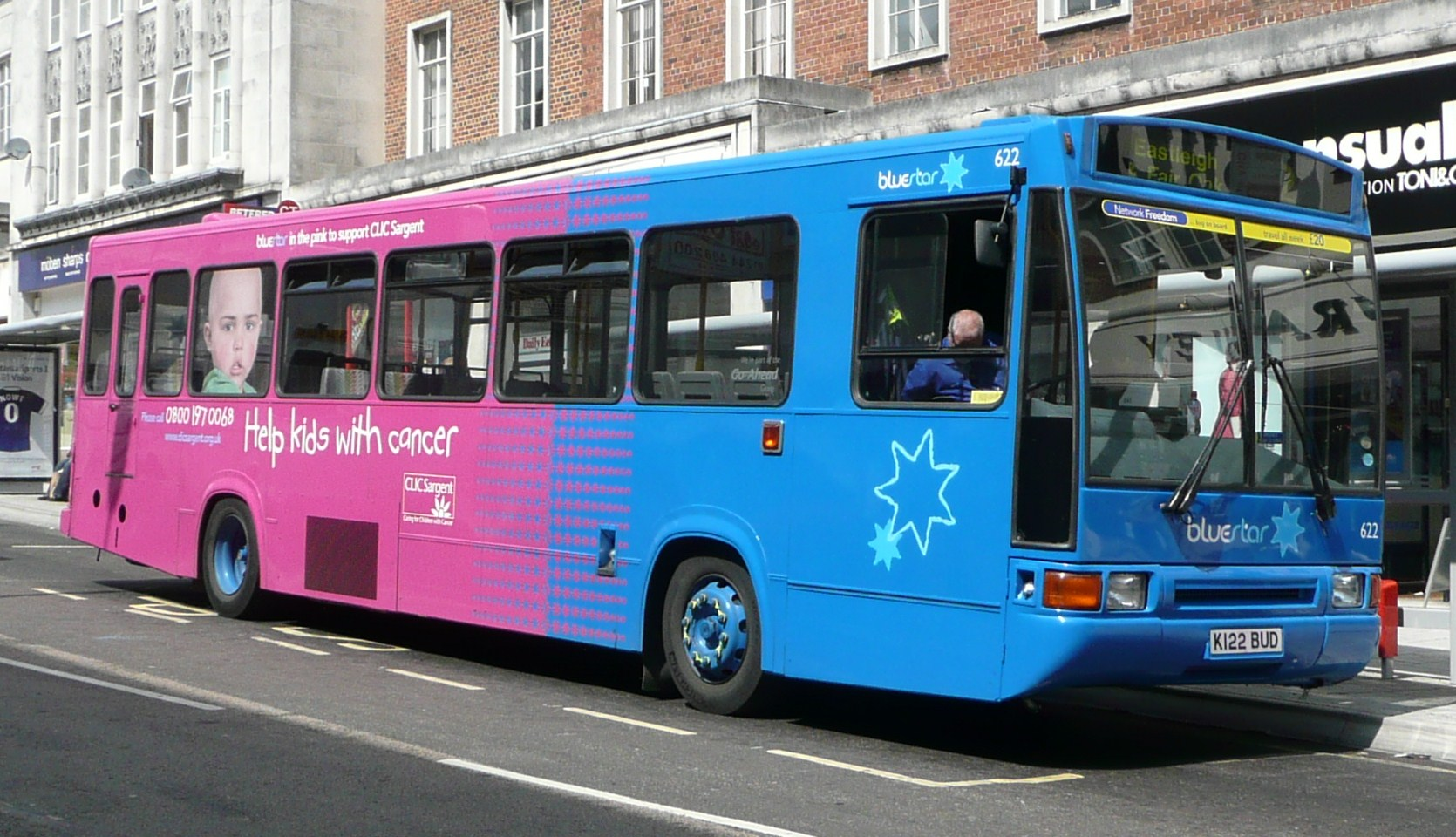
A Bluestar bus in a special advertising livery to support the charity.

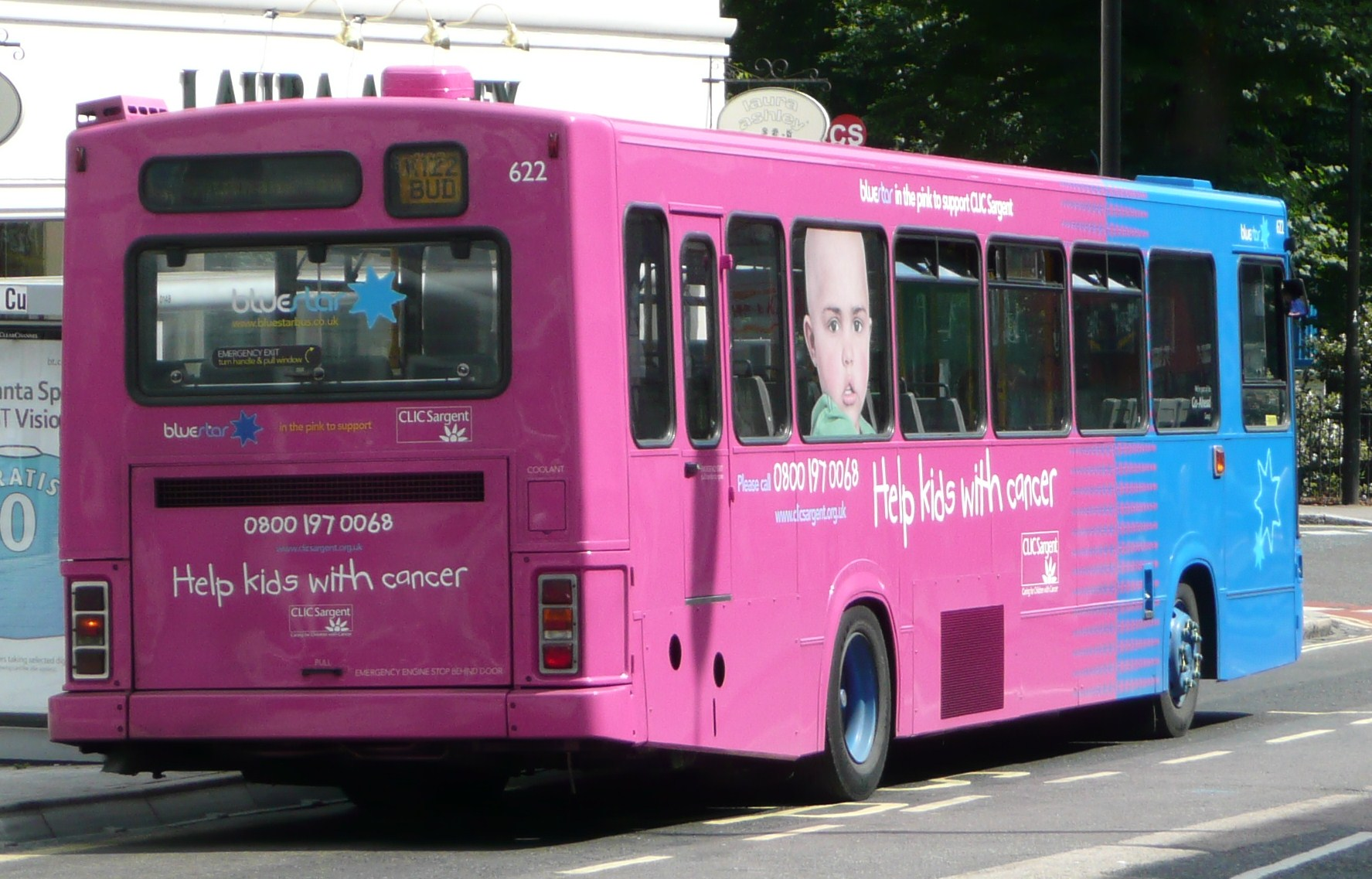
Rear of the Bluestar bus in the special advertising livery.

== See also ==
- Blood Cancer UK
- Children with Cancer UK
- Leonora Children's Cancer Fund
- Solving Kids' Cancer UK
- Neuroblastoma Society
- Liam Fairhurst - charity fundraiser
- Joyce Lishman - social care leader

General:

- Cancer in the United Kingdom
