= VASP (disambiguation) =

VASP can refer to:

- Value-added service provider, a service supplier in telecommunications
- Vasodilator-stimulated phosphoprotein, a human protein
- Vesicoamniotic shunting procedure; see Shunt (medical)
- Viação Aérea São Paulo airline
- Vienna Ab-initio Simulation Package, a quantum chemistry simulation package
