= Mir-650 microRNA precursor family =

mir-650

Identifiers
- Symbol: mir-650
- Rfam: RF00952
- miRBase family: MIPF0000457

Other data
- RNA type: microRNA
- Domain: Eukaryota;
- PDB structures: PDBe

In molecular biology mir-650 microRNA is a short RNA molecule. MicroRNAs function to regulate the expression levels of other genes by several mechanisms.

== Diabetic and Non-Diabetic Heart Failure ==
miR-650 is one of a group of six miRNAs with altered expression levels in diabetic and non-diabetic heart failure. This altered expression corresponds to various enriched cardiac dysfunctions.

== NDRG2 regulation ==
miR-650 has further been reported to target a homologous DNA region in the promoter region of the NDRG2 gene. There is direct regulation of this gene at a transcriptional level, leading to repressed NDRG2 expression.

== See also ==
- MicroRNA
