= 3F8 =

Monoclonal antibody

Monoclonal antibody
- Type: ?
- Source: Mouse
- Target: GD2

Clinical data
- Routes of administration: intravenous
- ATC code: none

Identifiers
- CAS Number: 339169-93-6
- ChemSpider: none
- UNII: 3GFS72WN4M

3F8 is a murine IgG3 monoclonal antibody which binds to GD2.

It has been used in the detection and treatment of neuroblastoma. For imaging neuroblastoma, it is labelled with one of the radioisotopes iodine-124 and iodine-131.

== See also ==
- Monoclonal antibody therapy
