= DPYSL3 =

Protein-coding gene in the species Homo sapiens

Identifiers
- Aliases: DPYSL3, CRMP-4, CRMP4, DRP-3, DRP3, LCRMP, ULIP, ULIP-1, dihydropyrimidinase like 3
- External IDs: OMIM: 601168; MGI: 1349762; GeneCards: DPYSL3
Available structures
PDB	Ortholog search: PDBe RCSB
PDB	List of PDB id codes 4BKN, 4CNS, 4CNT, 4CNU

Gene location (Human)
Chr.	Chromosome 5 (human)
Band	5q32	Start	147,390,808 bp
Band	5q32	End	147,510,068 bp

Gene location (Mouse)
Chr.	Chromosome 18 (mouse)
Band	18|18 B3	Start	43,454,049 bp
Band	18|18 B3	End	43,571,351 bp
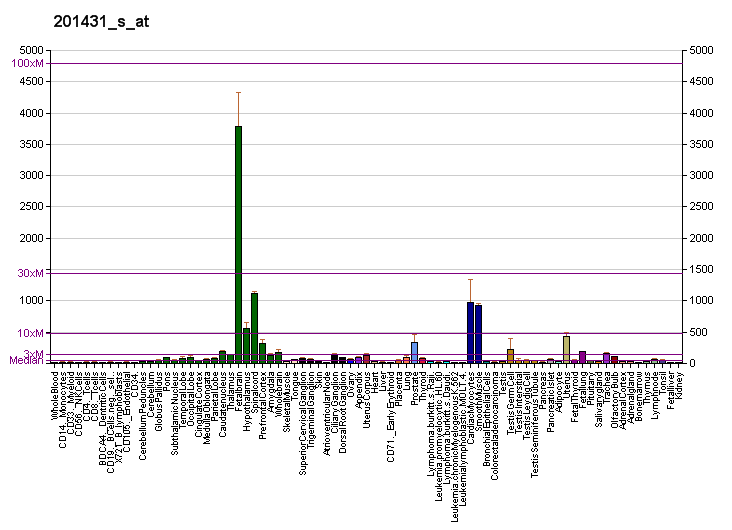

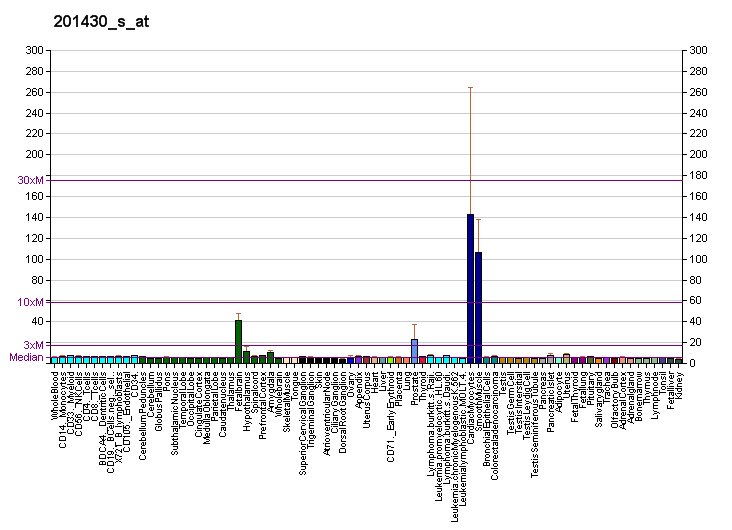
RNA expression pattern
Bgee	Human / Mouse (ortholog); Top expressed in: ganglionic eminence; ventricular zone; saphenous vein; gastric mucosa; tail of epididymis; right coronary artery; tibial arteries; ascending aorta; urethra; optic nerve / Top expressed in: superior cervical ganglion; Rostral migratory stream; barrel cortex; ganglionic eminence; seminiferous tubule; optic nerve; medial ganglionic eminence; neural tube; sexually immature organism; pineal gland; More reference expression data
BioGPS	More reference expression data
Gene ontology
Molecular function	SH3 domain binding; protein binding; hydrolase activity, acting on carbon-nitrogen (but not peptide) bonds; chondroitin sulfate binding; hydrolase activity; filamin binding
Cellular component	cytoplasm; cell body; filamentous actin; cytosol; cell projection; exocytic vesicle; growth cone; lamellipodium; extracellular space; synapse
Biological process	negative regulation of neuron projection development; regulation of cell migration; regulation of neuron projection development; neuron development; actin filament bundle assembly; negative regulation of cell migration; response to axon injury; actin crosslink formation; positive regulation of neuron projection development; protein homooligomerization; positive regulation of filopodium assembly; cellular response to cytokine stimulus
Sources:Amigo / QuickGO
Orthologs
Databases	NCBI: entry; OMA: entry
Species	Human	Mouse
Entrez	1809	22240
Ensembl	ENSG00000113657	ENSMUSG00000024501
UniProt	Q14195	Q62188
RefSeq (mRNA)	NM_001197294; NM_001387	NM_001136086; NM_001291455; NM_009468
RefSeq (protein)	NP_001184223; NP_001378	NP_001129558; NP_001278384; NP_033494
Location (UCSC)	Chr 5: 147.39 – 147.51 Mb	Chr 18: 43.45 – 43.57 Mb
PubMed search
- Wikidata
View/Edit Human	View/Edit Mouse

Dihydropyrimidinase-related protein 3 is an enzyme that in humans is encoded by the DPYSL3 gene. A recent bioinformatics study suggested that the DPYSL3 gene might have a prognostic role in neuroblastoma.
