= Dinutuximab =

Pharmaceutical drug

Monoclonal antibody
- Type: Whole antibody
- Source: Chimeric (mouse/human)
- Target: GD2

Clinical data
- Trade names: Unituxin, Qarziba, others
- Other names: Ch14.18, APN-311
- AHFS/Drugs.com: Monograph
- MedlinePlus: a615022
- License data: US DailyMed: Dinutuximab
- Pregnancy category: AU: C
- Routes of administration: Intravenous
- ATC code: L01FX06 (WHO)

Legal status
- Legal status: AU: S4 (Prescription only); CA: ℞-only / Schedule D; UK: POM (Prescription only); US: ℞-only; EU: Rx-only

Identifiers
- CAS Number: 1363687-32-4
- IUPHAR/BPS: 7979
- DrugBank: DB09077
- ChemSpider: none
- UNII: 7SQY4ZUD30
- KEGG: D10559
- ChEMBL: ChEMBL3137342

Chemical and physical data
- Formula: C_{6422}H_{9982}N_{1722}O_{2008}S_{48}
- Molar mass: 144981.42 g·mol^{−1}

Dinutuximab (Ch14.18, tradename Unituxin) and dinutuximab beta (tradename Qarziba) are monoclonal antibodies used as a second-line treatment for children with high-risk neuroblastoma. Each antibody is made of both mouse and human components and targets glycolipid GD2, expressed on neuroblastoma cells and on normal cells of neuroectodermal origin, including the central nervous system and peripheral nerves. They differ in that dinutuximab is manufactured using mouse cells, and dinutuximab beta is manufactured using hamster cells. The dosing regime differs, and dinutuximab is given in combination with granulocyte-macrophage colony stimulating factor (GM-CSF), interleukin-2 (IL-2) and 13-cis-retinoic acid (RA), while dinutuximab beta can be given alone.

They both cause severe side effects, including severe pain that must be controlled with morphine, and a high risk of infusion reaction that must be controlled with antihistamines and anti-inflammatory drugs. They both work by binding to neurons and causing the body's immune system to destroy them.

Dinutuximab received marketing approval in the US and in the European Union in March 2015; the marketing approval was withdrawn in 2017. Dinutuximab beta received marketing approval in Europe in 2017. The antibody was originally called Ch14.18 and was discovered by a group at University of California San Diego led by Alice Yu; this antibody and several others were brought into clinical trials funded by the National Cancer Institute.

== Medical use ==
Dinutuximab is used as post-consolidation therapy for children with high-risk neuroblastoma, in combination with granulocyte-macrophage colony-stimulating factor, interleukin-2, 13-cis-retinoic acid. It is given in patients who have completed induction therapy and consolidation therapy (autologous bone marrow transplant and external beam radiation therapy), as part of standard-of-care therapy for newly-diagnosed high-risk neuroblastoma. It is given by intravenous infusion, over ten to twenty hours, four days in a row. It is also used second-line for relapsed/refractory neuroblastoma in combination with chemotherapy and GM-CSF.

Dinutuximab beta is also used as a second line treatment for children with high-risk neuroblastoma; it was tested and is used with a longer and slower dosing regime, and is given on its own, although it may be combined with IL-2 if a stronger immune response is needed.

Morphine is administered prior to, during, and for two hours after infusion of dinutuximab and dinutuximab beta to manage the severe pain that this drug causes. An antihistamine and an anti-inflammatory are also given before, during, and after to manage the infusion reaction.

Women who are pregnant or who might become pregnant should not take dinutuximab or dinutuximab beta, because it is very likely to cause harm to a fetus.

== Adverse effects ==
The US label for dinutuximab carries black box warnings for life-threatening infusion reactions and neurotoxicity, as it causes severe neuropathic pain, and can cause severe sensory neuropathy and severe peripheral motor neuropathy. Dinutuximab beta also has these adverse effects.

More than 25% of children taking these drugs experienced pain, fever, hives, vomiting, diarrhea, bone marrow suppression causing loss of platelets, red blood cells, white blood cells, and albumin, hypotension, electrolyte imbalance including low sodium, potassium, and calcium, elevated transaminases, infusion reactions, and capillary leak syndrome.

Other common adverse effects include retention or urine for weeks to months after receiving the drugs, protein in urine, blurred vision or dilated pupils, infections, edema, high blood pressure, bleeding that won't stop, tachycardia, and weight gain.

== Pharmacology ==
Dinutuximab and dinutuximab beta each work by binding to GD2, a glycolipid found on cells originating from the neuroectoderm during prenatal development, including neurons in the central nervous system and in the peripheral nervous system. Neuroblastoma cells have this as well. When dinutuximab binds to any cell that has GD2, that cell is destroyed via cell-mediated cytotoxicity and complement-dependent cytotoxicity.

In clinical trials of dinutuximab, the maximum plasma concentration was 11.5 mcg/mL; the mean steady state volume distribution was 5.4 L; the clearance rate was 0.21 L/day; and the average half-life was 10 days.

== Chemistry ==
Ch14.18 is a chimeric monoclonal antibody in which the variable heavy and light chain regions come from a mouse, with a human constant region for the heavy chain IgG1 and light chain kappa.

The version of dinutuximab made by United Therapeutics, and marketed under the brand name Unituxin, is manufactured via industrial fermentation using a murine myeloma cell line, SP2/0. The version marketed by EUSA for Apeiron is called generically dinutuximab beta and is marketed under the brand name Isquette, and is manufactured in Chinese hamster ovary cells.

== History ==
Dinutuximab (originally called Ch14.18) was discovered by a group at University of California San Diego led by Alice Yu; this antibody and several others were brought into clinical trials funded by the National Cancer Institute. The NCI manufactured the mAbs for the Phase III trial of Ch14.18 in combination with GM-CSF and IL-2, which was halted due to clear efficacy; the results published in 2009. No company had offered by that time to get FDA approval and commercialize the drug, so the NCI kept manufacturing it and making it available under compassionate use. In 2010, the NCI signed an agreement with United Therapeutics under which the company took over manufacturing and would bring the drug to market.

In the meantime in Europe, oncologists and patient advocates wanted to have the drug available in Europe, and made efforts to obtain the cell line used to make it from United Therapeutics and the originating lab at the NCI itself; when those efforts failed they reached out to a group at Memorial Sloan Kettering that had generated an anti-GD2 mAb and was making at MSK for administration to patients there, but this didn't work out either. A lab at the Children's Cancer Research Institute in Vienna, in collaboration with a network of European oncologists, had developed an anti-GD2 mAb that it made in CHO cells, and by 2011, it was in Phase III clinical trials, and the institute licensed its rights to Apeiron, a local biotech company.

The FDA approved United Therapeutics application in March 2015, as did the European Medicines Agency.

In 2017, United Therapeutics withdrew the European marketing authorization, and said that it was having trouble making enough of the drug to sell in Europe.

In October 2016, Apeiron licensed the rights to Ch14.18 to the UK biotech company, EUSA, and in May 2017, Apeiron and EUSA obtained EMA approval to market Ch14.18, by then called dinutuximab beta.
