= GD2 =

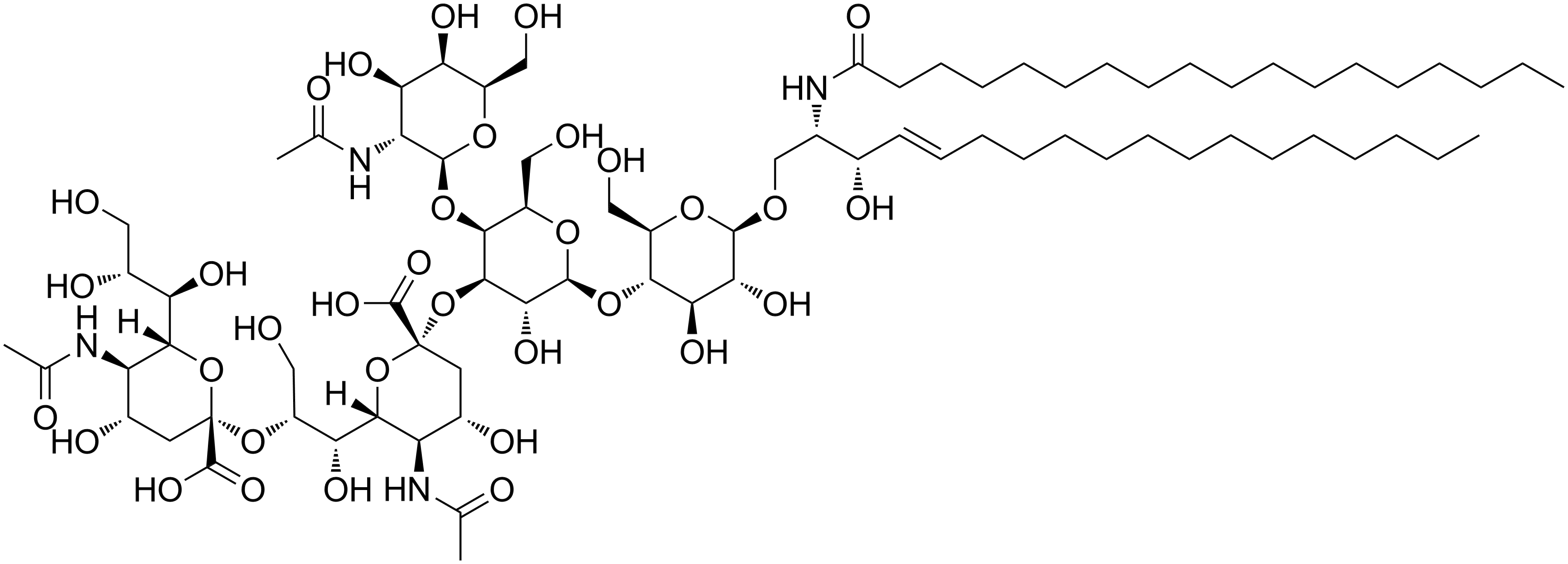

Names
- IUPAC name (2R,4R,5S,6S)-2-[3-[(2S,3S,4R,6S)-6-[(2S,3R,4R,5S,6R)-5-[(2S,3R,4R,5R,6R)-3-acetamido-4,5-dihydroxy-6-(hydroxymethyl)oxan-2-yl]oxy-2-[(2R,3S,4R,5R,6R)-4,5-dihydroxy-2-(hydroxymethyl)-6-[(E)-3-hydroxy-2-(octadecanoylamino)octadec-4-enoxy]oxan-3-yl]oxy-3-hydroxy-6-(hydroxymethyl)oxan-4-yl]oxy-3-amino-6-carboxy-4-hydroxyoxan-2-yl]-2,3-dihydroxypropoxy]-5-amino-4-hydroxy-6-(1,2,3-trihydroxypropyl)oxane-2-carboxylic acid
- Other names Ganglioside G2

Identifiers
CAS Number	[https://commonchemistry.cas.org/detail?cas_rn=65988-71-8 ChemSpider ID: 4952955 65988-71-8 ChemSpider ID: 4952955]
3D model (JSmol)	Interactive image
PubChem CID	6450346
UNII	FUI2V09E1C
CompTox Dashboard (EPA)	DTXSID70893901
- InChI: InChI=1S/C74H134N4O32/c1-4-6-8-10-12-14-16-18-19-21-23-25-27-29-31-33-52(89)78-43(44(84)32-30-28-26-24-22-20-17-15-13-11-9-7-5-2)40-101-69-61(95)60(94)63(50(38-81)104-69)106-70-62(96)67(64(51(39-82)105-70)107-68-55(77-42(3)83)59(93)58(92)49(37-80)103-68)110-74(72(99)100)35-46(86)54(76)66(109-74)57(91)48(88)41-102-73(71(97)98)34-45(85)53(75)65(108-73)56(90)47(87)36-79/h30,32,43-51,53-70,79-82,84-88,90-96H,4-29,31,33-41,75-76H2,1-3H3,(H,77,83)(H,78,89)(H,97,98)(H,99,100)/b32-30+/t43?,44?,45-,46-,47?,48?,49-,50-,51-,53+,54+,55-,56?,57?,58+,59-,60-,61-,62-,63-,64+,65+,66+,67-,68+,69-,70+,73-,74+/m1/s1 Key: FFILOTSTFMXQJC-QCFYAKGBSA-N
- SMILES: CCCCCCCCCCCCCCCCCC(=O)NC(CO[C@H]1[C@@H]([C@H]([C@@H]([C@H](O1)CO)O[C@H]2[C@@H]([C@H]([C@H]([C@H](O2)CO)O[C@H]3[C@@H]([C@H]([C@H]([C@H](O3)CO)O)O)NC(=O)C)O[C@@]4(C[C@H]([C@@H]([C@H](O4)C(C(CO[C@@]5(C[C@H]([C@@H]([C@H](O5)C(C(CO)O)O)N)O)C(=O)O)O)O)N)O)C(=O)O)O)O)O)C(/C=C/CCCCCCCCCCCCC)O

Properties
Chemical formula	C_{74}H_{134}N_{4}O_{32}
Molar mass	1591.882 g·mol^{−1}
- Except where otherwise noted, data are given for materials in their standard state (at 25 °C [77 °F], 100 kPa). verify (what is ?) Infobox references

GD2 is a disialoganglioside expressed on tumors of neuroectodermal origin, including human neuroblastoma and melanoma, with highly restricted expression on normal tissues, principally to the cerebellum and peripheral nerves in humans.

The relatively tumor-specific expression of GD2 makes it a suitable target for immunotherapy with monoclonal antibodies or with artificial T cell receptors, Recently, GD2 has been explored as a therapeutic target in neuroblastoma using genetically engineered M13 bacteriophages. In this approach, the phages were modified to display an anti-GD2 single-chain variable fragment (scFv) derived from the FDA-approved antibody dinutuximab on their pIII coat protein. These engineered phages were further loaded with hundreds of photosensitizer molecules to enable selective delivery to GD2-positive neuroblastoma cells. Upon activation by laser light or ultrasound, the photosensitizers triggered precise and targeted killing of GD2-expressing tumor cells both in vitro and in vivo. An example of such antibodies is hu14.18K322A, a monoclonal antibody. This anti-GD2 antibody is currently undergoing a phase II clinical trial in the treatment of previously untreated high risk neuroblastoma given alongside combination chemotherapy prior to stem cell transplant and radiation therapy. A prior phase I clinical trial for patients with refractory or recurrent neuroblastoma designed to decrease toxicity found safe dosage amounts and determined that common toxicities, particularly pain, could be well managed. The chimeric (murine-human) anti-GD2 monoclonal antibody ch14.18 is FDA-approved for the treatment of pediatric patients with high-risk neuroblastoma and has been studied in patients with other GD2-expressing tumors.

== See also ==
- 3F8
