= PFN2 =

Protein-coding gene in the species Homo sapiens

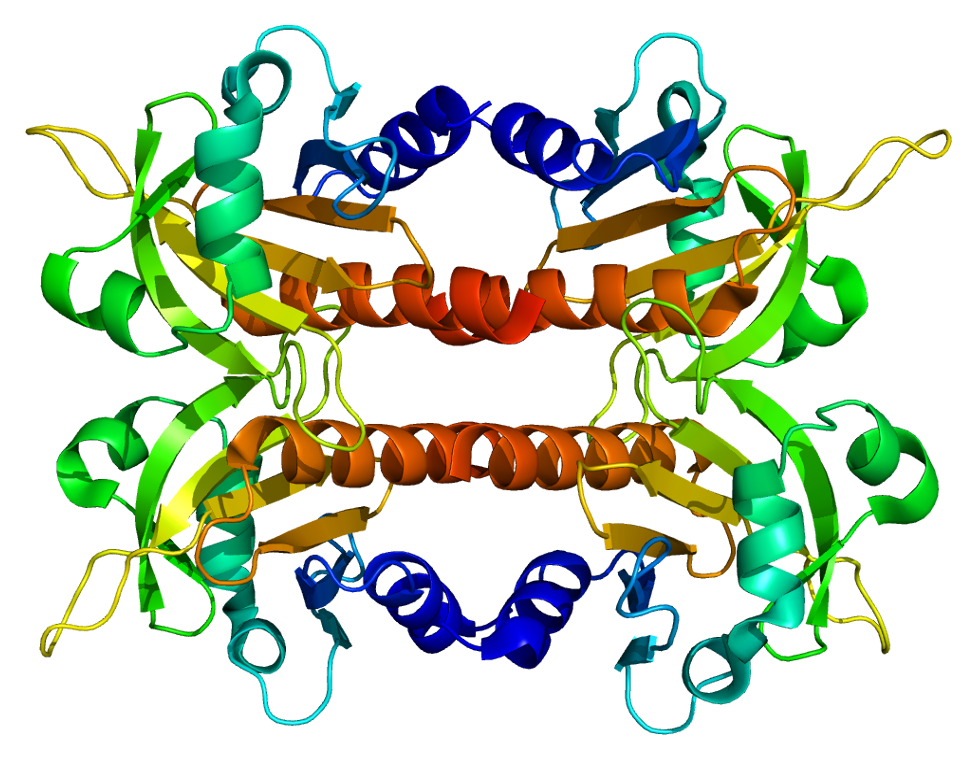

Identifiers
- Aliases: PFN2, D3S1319E, PFL, profilin 2
- External IDs: OMIM: 176590; MGI: 97550; GeneCards: PFN2
Available structures
PDB	Ortholog search: PDBe RCSB
PDB	List of PDB id codes 1D1J

Gene location (Human)
Chr.	Chromosome 3 (human)
Band	3q25.1	Start	149,964,904 bp
Band	3q25.1	End	150,050,788 bp
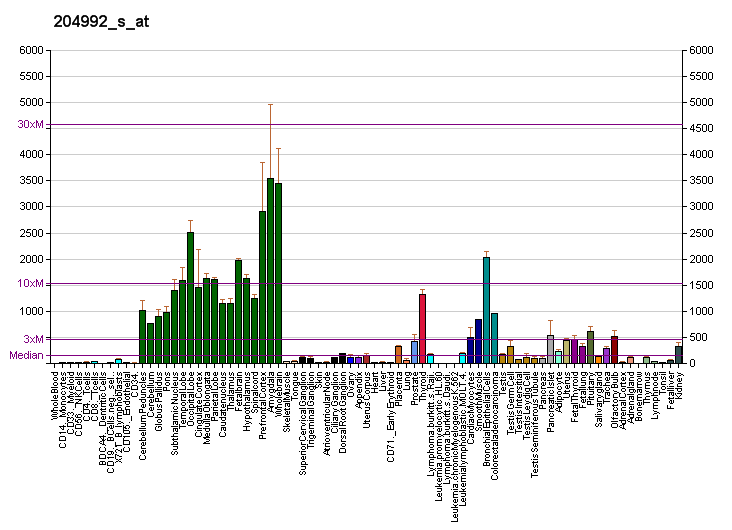
RNA expression pattern
Bgee	Human / Mouse (ortholog); Top expressed in: frontal pole; superior frontal gyrus; postcentral gyrus; Brodmann area 10; pons; middle temporal gyrus; orbitofrontal cortex; ganglionic eminence; glutes; ventricular zone / n/a; More reference expression data
BioGPS	More reference expression data
Gene ontology
Molecular function	actin binding; phosphatidylinositol-4,5-bisphosphate binding; actin monomer binding; protein binding; ATPase activity
Cellular component	cytoplasm; terminal bouton; extracellular exosome; cytoskeleton; Schaffer collateral - CA1 synapse; presynapse; postsynapse; glutamatergic synapse
Biological process	regulation of actin filament polymerization; regulation of synaptic vesicle exocytosis; protein stabilization; positive regulation of actin filament bundle assembly; positive regulation of actin filament polymerization; negative regulation of actin filament polymerization; positive regulation of ATP-dependent activity; negative regulation of epithelial cell migration; positive regulation of stress fiber assembly; actin cytoskeleton organization; positive regulation of peptidyl-serine phosphorylation; negative regulation of ruffle assembly; modification of postsynaptic actin cytoskeleton
Sources:Amigo / QuickGO
Orthologs
Databases	NCBI: entry; OMA: entry
Species	Human	Mouse
Entrez	5217	18645
Ensembl	ENSG00000070087	ENSMUSG00000027805
UniProt	P35080	Q9JJV2
RefSeq (mRNA)	NM_053024; NM_002628	NM_019410
RefSeq (protein)	NP_002619; NP_444252	NP_062283
Location (UCSC)	Chr 3: 149.96 – 150.05 Mb	n/a
PubMed search
- Wikidata
View/Edit Human	View/Edit Mouse

Profilin-2 is a protein that in humans is encoded by the PFN2 gene.

The protein encoded by this gene is a ubiquitous actin monomer-binding protein belonging to the profilin family. It is thought to regulate actin polymerization in response to extracellular signals. There are two alternatively spliced transcript variants encoding different isoforms described for this gene.

== Interactions ==
PFN2 has been shown to interact with ROCK1, Vasodilator-stimulated phosphoprotein, CFAP263 and FMNL1.
