= Liam Fairhurst =

British activist (1995–2009)

Liam Fairhurst (26 February 1995 – 30 June 2009) was a British charity fundraiser who had been diagnosed with synovial sarcoma. He was diagnosed with the disease in his leg in 2005, and large portions of his leg muscles had to be removed. The cancer eventually spread to his lungs. By the time of his death, he had collected almost £320,000, mainly for children's cancer charity CLIC Sargent.

Born in Soham, Cambridgeshire, Fairhurst began charity work after his friend, Jack Wilkinson, died of cancer in 2006, aged 12. He decided to raise money for a holiday home in Yorkshire for families living with childhood cancer. Barely able to walk, he began fundraising with a one-mile swim in 2006.

Fairhurst's courage impressed and inspired people such as Prime Minister Gordon Brown and his wife Sarah Brown. After Fairhurst's death, Brown said: "Liam was a courageous young man who showed immense bravery in the face of his illness. It was a privilege to meet him - his dedication as a fundraiser was an encouragement to us all and I am very proud of what Liam achieved. His courage will be a continuing inspiration to all those that knew him. My thoughts are with his family at this sad time."

== Awards ==
- Voted Britain's Kindest Kid in a Five News/Charities Aid Foundation (CAF) competition
- Diana Award, June 2007
- Child of Courage awards, 2008, presented by Sir Richard Branson and Rebecca Adlington, at the Daily Mirror's "Pride of Britain" Awards in London
