= Vasodilator-stimulated phosphoprotein =

Mammalian protein found in Homo sapiens

VASP
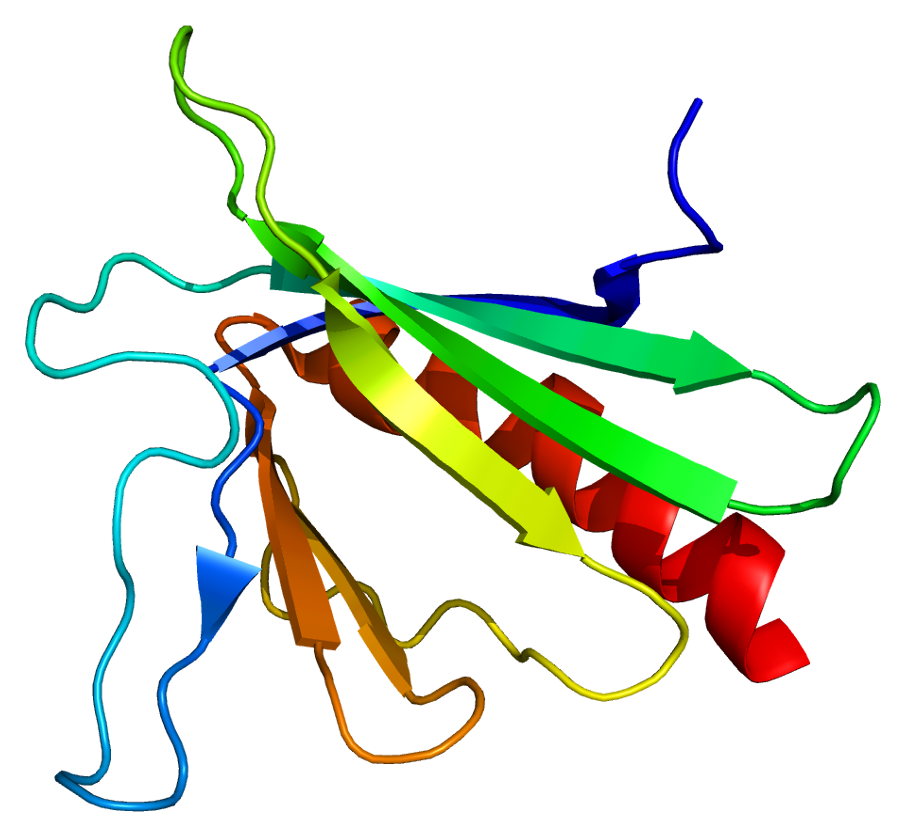
Available structures
PDB	Ortholog search: PDBe RCSB
PDB	List of PDB id codes 1EGX, 1USD, 1USE, 2PAV, 2PBD, 3CHW

Identifiers
- Aliases: VASP, vasodilator-stimulated phosphoprotein, vasodilator stimulated phosphoprotein
- External IDs: OMIM: 601703; MGI: 109268; HomoloGene: 7592; GeneCards: VASP; OMA:VASP - orthologs

Gene location (Human)
Chr.	Chromosome 19 (human)
Band	19q13.32	Start	45,506,579 bp
Band	19q13.32	End	45,526,983 bp

Gene location (Mouse)
Chr.	Chromosome 7 (mouse)
Band	7|7 A3	Start	18,990,854 bp
Band	7|7 A3	End	19,005,742 bp
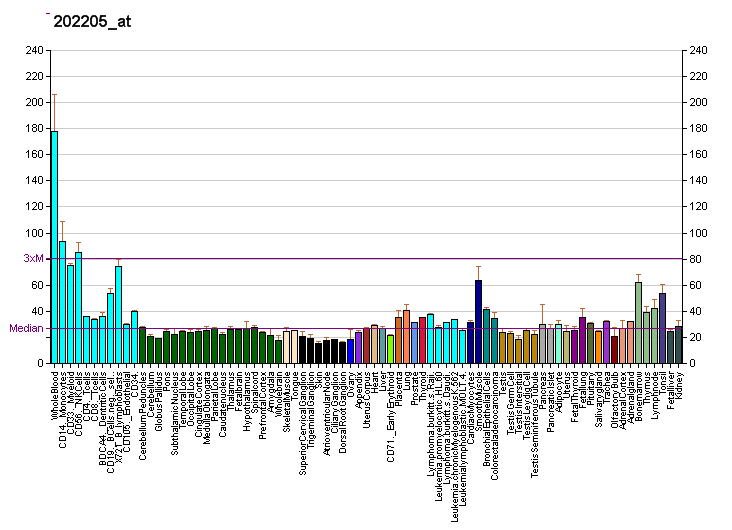
RNA expression pattern
Bgee	Human / Mouse (ortholog); Top expressed in: granulocyte; monocyte; mucosa of transverse colon; saphenous vein; spleen; blood; muscle layer of sigmoid colon; rectum; thoracic aorta; ascending aorta / Top expressed in: granulocyte; mesenteric lymph nodes; tibiofemoral joint; colon; spleen; left colon; left lung lobe; pyloric antrum; epithelium of stomach; atrium; More reference expression data
BioGPS	More reference expression data
Gene ontology
Molecular function	profilin binding; SH3 domain binding; protein binding; actin binding; cadherin binding
Cellular component	cell projection; membrane; focal adhesion; bicellular tight junction; filopodium; plasma membrane; cell junction; actin cytoskeleton; extracellular exosome; cytoskeleton; lamellipodium membrane; lamellipodium; filopodium membrane; cytoplasm; cytosol
Biological process	positive regulation of actin filament polymerization; axon guidance; neural tube closure; actin polymerization or depolymerization; protein homotetramerization; actin cytoskeleton organization; cell junction assembly
Sources:Amigo / QuickGO
Orthologs
Species	Human	Mouse
Entrez	7408	22323
Ensembl	ENSG00000125753	ENSMUSG00000030403
UniProt	P50552	P70460
RefSeq (mRNA)	NM_001008736; NM_003370	NM_001282021; NM_001282022; NM_009499
RefSeq (protein)	NP_003361	NP_001268950; NP_001268951; NP_033525
Location (UCSC)	Chr 19: 45.51 – 45.53 Mb	Chr 7: 18.99 – 19.01 Mb
PubMed search
- Wikidata
View/Edit Human	View/Edit Mouse

Vasodilator-stimulated phosphoprotein is a protein that in humans is encoded by the VASP gene.

== Function ==
Vasodilator-stimulated phosphoprotein (VASP) is a member of the Ena-VASP protein family. Ena-VASP family members contain an N-terminal EVH1 domain that binds proteins containing E/DFPPPPXD/E motifs and targets Ena-VASP proteins to focal adhesions cell membranes. In the mid-region of the protein, family members have a proline-rich region that binds SH3 and WW domain-containing proteins. Their C-terminal EVH2 domain mediates tetramerization and binds both G and F actin. VASP is associated with filamentous actin formation and likely plays a widespread role in cell adhesion and motility. VASP may also be involved in the intracellular signaling pathways that regulate integrin-extracellular matrix interactions. VASP is regulated by the cyclic nucleotide-dependent kinases PKA and PKG.

== Interactions ==
Vasodilator-stimulated phosphoprotein has been shown to interact with Zyxin, Profilin 1, and PFN2.
