= NDRG2 =

Protein-coding gene in humans

Available structures
PDB	Ortholog search: PDBe RCSB
PDB	List of PDB id codes 2XMQ, 2XMR, 2XMS

Identifiers
- Aliases: NDRG2, SYLD, NDRG family member 2
- External IDs: OMIM: 605272; MGI: 1352498; HomoloGene: 22785; GeneCards: NDRG2; OMA:NDRG2 - orthologs

Gene location (Human)
Chr.	Chromosome 14 (human)
Band	14q11.2	Start	21,016,763 bp
Band	14q11.2	End	21,070,872 bp

Gene location (Mouse)
Chr.	Chromosome 14 (mouse)
Band	14|14 C1	Start	51,905,271 bp
Band	14|14 C1	End	51,913,488 bp
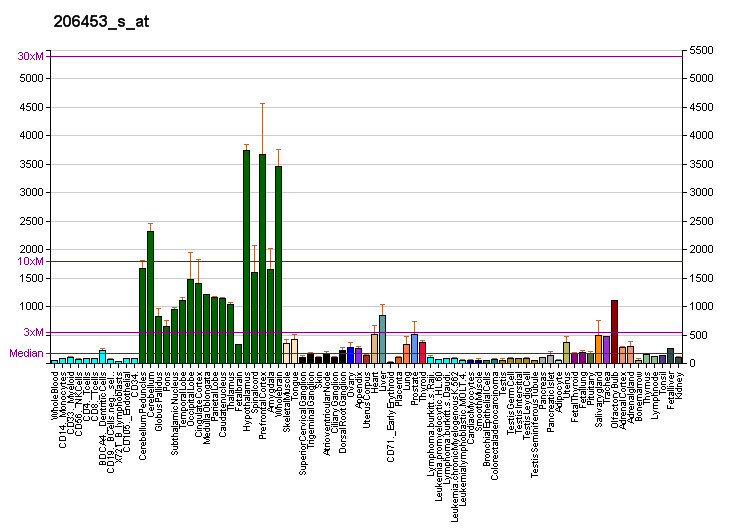

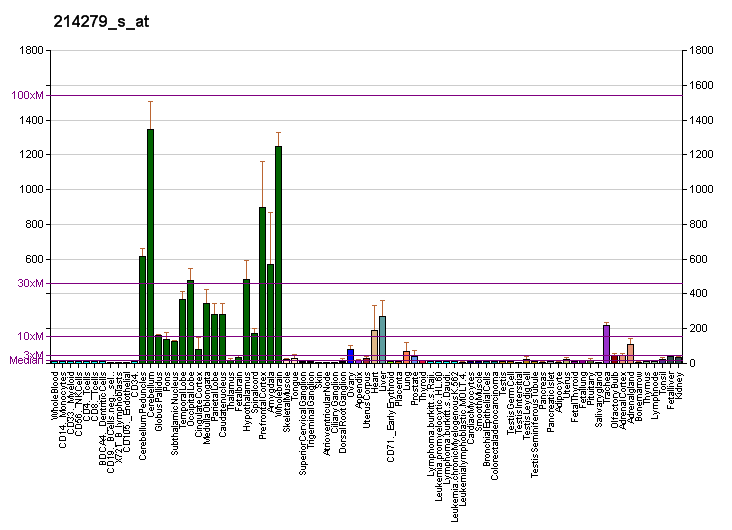
RNA expression pattern
Bgee	Human / Mouse (ortholog); Top expressed in: right frontal lobe; amygdala; right hemisphere of cerebellum; nucleus accumbens; putamen; hypothalamus; internal globus pallidus; caudate nucleus; prefrontal cortex; C1 segment / Top expressed in: muscle of thigh; wall of urinary bladder; mucosa of urinary bladder; transitional epithelium of urinary bladder; superior frontal gyrus; extensor digitorum longus muscle; cerebellar cortex; triceps brachii muscle; dentate gyrus of hippocampal formation granule cell; temporal muscle; More reference expression data
BioGPS	More reference expression data
Gene ontology
Molecular function	protein binding; molecular function
Cellular component	growth cone; nucleus; perinuclear region of cytoplasm; Golgi apparatus; cell projection; cytosol; extracellular exosome; cytoplasm
Biological process	negative regulation of smooth muscle cell proliferation; regulation of vascular endothelial growth factor production; negative regulation of cytokine production; nervous system development; multicellular organism development; cell differentiation; substantia nigra development; Wnt signaling pathway; negative regulation of ERK1 and ERK2 cascade; regulation of platelet-derived growth factor production; signal transduction
Sources:Amigo / QuickGO
Orthologs
Species	Human	Mouse
Entrez	57447	29811
Ensembl	ENSG00000165795	ENSMUSG00000004558
UniProt	Q9UN36	Q9QYG0
RefSeq (mRNA)	NM_001282211; NM_001282212; NM_001282213; NM_001282214; NM_001282215 NM_001282216; NM_016250; NM_201535; NM_201536; NM_201537; NM_201538; NM_201539; NM_201540; NM_201541; NM_001320329; NM_001354559; NM_001354562; NM_001354566; NM_001354567; NM_001354568; NM_001354569; NM_001354570; NM_001354558; NM_001354560; NM_001354561; NM_001354564; NM_001354565	NM_001145959; NM_013864
RefSeq (protein)	NP_001269140; NP_001269141; NP_001269142; NP_001269143; NP_001269144 NP_001269145; NP_001307258; NP_057334; NP_963293; NP_963294; NP_963831; NP_963832; NP_963833; NP_963834; NP_963835; NP_001341488; NP_001341491; NP_001341495; NP_001341496; NP_001341497; NP_001341498; NP_001341499; NP_001341487; NP_001341489; NP_001341490; NP_001341493; NP_001341494	NP_001139431; NP_038892; NP_001347193; NP_001347194; NP_001347195 NP_001347196; NP_001347197; NP_001347198; NP_001347199; NP_001347200; NP_001347201; NP_001347202; NP_001347203; NP_001347205
Location (UCSC)	Chr 14: 21.02 – 21.07 Mb	Chr 14: 51.91 – 51.91 Mb
PubMed search
- Wikidata
View/Edit Human	View/Edit Mouse

Protein NDRG2 is a protein that in humans is encoded by the NDRG2 gene (NMYC downstream-regulated gene 2).

== Function ==
This gene is a member of the N-myc downregulated gene family which belongs to the alpha/beta hydrolase superfamily. The protein encoded by this gene is a cytoplasmic protein that may play a role in neurite outgrowth. This gene may be involved in glioblastoma and aggressive meningioma carcinogenesis (via cell proliferation). Several alternatively spliced transcript variants of this gene have been described, but the full-length nature of some of these variants has not been determined.
