= NDRG4 =

Protein-coding gene in the species Homo sapiens

Identifiers
- Aliases: NDRG4, BDM1, SMAP-8, SMAP8, NDRG family member 4
- External IDs: OMIM: 614463; MGI: 2384590; HomoloGene: 23228; GeneCards: NDRG4; OMA:NDRG4 - orthologs

Gene location (Human)
Chr.	Chromosome 16 (human)
Band	16q21	Start	58,462,846 bp
Band	16q21	End	58,513,628 bp

Gene location (Mouse)
Chr.	Chromosome 8 (mouse)
Band	8|8 D1	Start	95,676,980 bp
Band	8|8 D1	End	95,715,119 bp
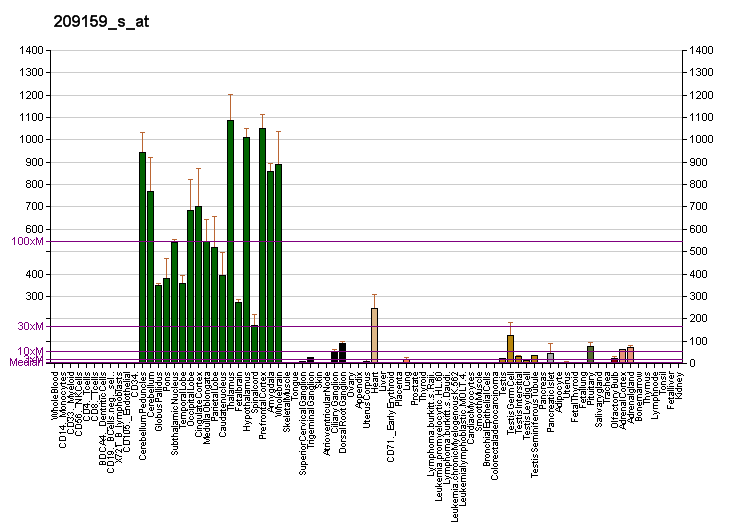
RNA expression pattern
Bgee	Human / Mouse (ortholog); Top expressed in: right hemisphere of cerebellum; pons; lateral nuclear group of thalamus; right frontal lobe; prefrontal cortex; apex of heart; nucleus accumbens; cerebellar vermis; caudate nucleus; dorsolateral prefrontal cortex / Top expressed in: olfactory tubercle; medial dorsal nucleus; medial geniculate nucleus; pontine nuclei; dorsal tegmental nucleus; habenula; medial vestibular nucleus; lateral geniculate nucleus; nucleus accumbens; globus pallidus; More reference expression data
BioGPS	More reference expression data
Gene ontology
Molecular function	protein binding; molecular function
Cellular component	cytosol; basolateral plasma membrane; cell projection membrane; cytoplasm; mitochondrion; endoplasmic reticulum membrane
Biological process	visual learning; negative regulation of platelet-derived growth factor receptor signaling pathway; cell migration involved in heart development; cell differentiation; negative regulation of smooth muscle cell proliferation; regulation of endocytic recycling; negative regulation of smooth muscle cell migration; cardiac muscle cell proliferation; embryonic heart tube development; heart looping; cell growth; vesicle docking; positive regulation of ERK1 and ERK2 cascade; positive regulation of neuron projection development; brain development; signal transduction
Sources:Amigo / QuickGO
Orthologs
Species	Human	Mouse
Entrez	65009	234593
Ensembl	ENSG00000103034	ENSMUSG00000036564
UniProt	Q9ULP0	Q8BTG7
RefSeq (mRNA)	NM_001130487; NM_001242833; NM_001242834; NM_001242835; NM_001242836 NM_020465; NM_022910; NM_001363869	NM_001195006; NM_145602
RefSeq (protein)	NP_001123959; NP_001229762; NP_001229763; NP_001229764; NP_001229765 NP_065198; NP_075061; NP_001350798; NP_001365261; NP_001365262; NP_001365263; NP_001365264; NP_001365265; NP_001365266; NP_001365267; NP_001365268; NP_001365269; NP_001365270; NP_001365271; NP_001365272; NP_001365273; NP_001365274; NP_001365275; NP_001365276	NP_001181935; NP_663577; NP_001359350; NP_001359352; NP_001359354 NP_001359355; NP_001359356; NP_001359357; NP_001359358; NP_001359359; NP_001359360; NP_001359361; NP_001359362; NP_001359363; NP_001359364
Location (UCSC)	Chr 16: 58.46 – 58.51 Mb	Chr 8: 95.68 – 95.72 Mb
PubMed search
- Wikidata
View/Edit Human	View/Edit Mouse

Protein NDRG4 is a protein that in humans is encoded by the NDRG4 gene.

This gene is a member of the N-myc downregulated gene family which belongs to the alpha/beta hydrolase superfamily. The protein encoded by this gene is a cytoplasmic protein that may be involved in the regulation of mitogenic signalling in vascular smooth muscles cells. Several alternatively spliced transcript variants of this gene have been described, but the full-length nature of some of these variants has not been determined.
