= Children with Cancer UK =

UK charity

- Formerly: Children with Leukaemia
- Company type: Charitable organisation (England)
- Founded: 12 January 1988
- Headquarters: Third floor, 21-27 Lamb's Conduit Street, London WC1N 3NL
- Key people: Phil Hall (Trustee)
- Revenue: 14,332,347 pound sterling (2017)
- Number of employees: 37 (2017)
- Website: www.childrenwithcanceruk.org.uk

Children with Cancer UK (formerly Children with Leukaemia) is a United Kingdom-based charity dedicated to raising money for research and providing care for children with cancer and their families. The aims of their research projects are to understand what causes children to get cancer and to develop improved treatments. The charity also organises days out and parties for families affected by childhood cancer.

== History ==
Children with Cancer UK was established in 1987 by Eddie and Marion O’Gorman and their family in memory of their son, Paul, who died from leukemia. The initial aim was to raise £100,000 for research and support. The O’Gormans lost a second child, their daughter Jean, to cancer shortly after their first fundraising event (The Paul O’Gorman Banquet and Ball). Subsequently, Diana, Princess of Wales became involved in the charity, which she inaugurated in 1988. In January 2022, Phil Hall was appointed as a trustee of the charity.

== Fundraising ==
Since 1987, Children With Cancer UK has raised over £290 million, which is used to support research into the causes and treatment of cancer in children and clinical trials. The charity also funds research centres, such as the Northern Institute for Cancer Research. and respite accommodation for affected families. In 2007, they provided funding for a new £40 million biomedical research lab at the UCL Cancer Institute, named after the deceased Paul O'Gorman.

In the early 2000s, the charity co-funded elements of clinical trial that improved outcomes for children with leukaemia. The trial involved development of a test called the Minimal Residual Disease (MRD) test, which measures how much leukaemia remains after treatment and how likely it is that a child will relapse. In 2017 the charity funded into the development of precision medicine as treatment, which involves the genetic profiling of children with cancer and their tumours in order to personalise their treatment plans.

== Support ==
The charity was supported by a range of organisations in the UK including Mr Men Little Miss, who lent their characters to the vests worn the charity's London Marathon entrants.

For his services to charity Eddie O’Gorman was appointed an OBE in 2009. In November 2018, he was presented with the Pride of Britain 'Lifetime Achievement' award.

In 2019 it became the sponsor of League One football club Sunderland AFC. During the same season, BETDAQ donated its front-of-shirt sponsorship to the charity for its teams Sunderland AFC and Charlton Athletic F.C.
