= Neuroblastoma Society =

The Neuroblastoma Society is a UK charity that helps families affected by neuroblastoma by funding research and running a befriending scheme for parents. The charity was set up in 1982 by a group of parents whose children had suffered from or died of neuroblastoma.
