= N-Myc =

Protein-coding gene in the species Homo sapiens

MYCN
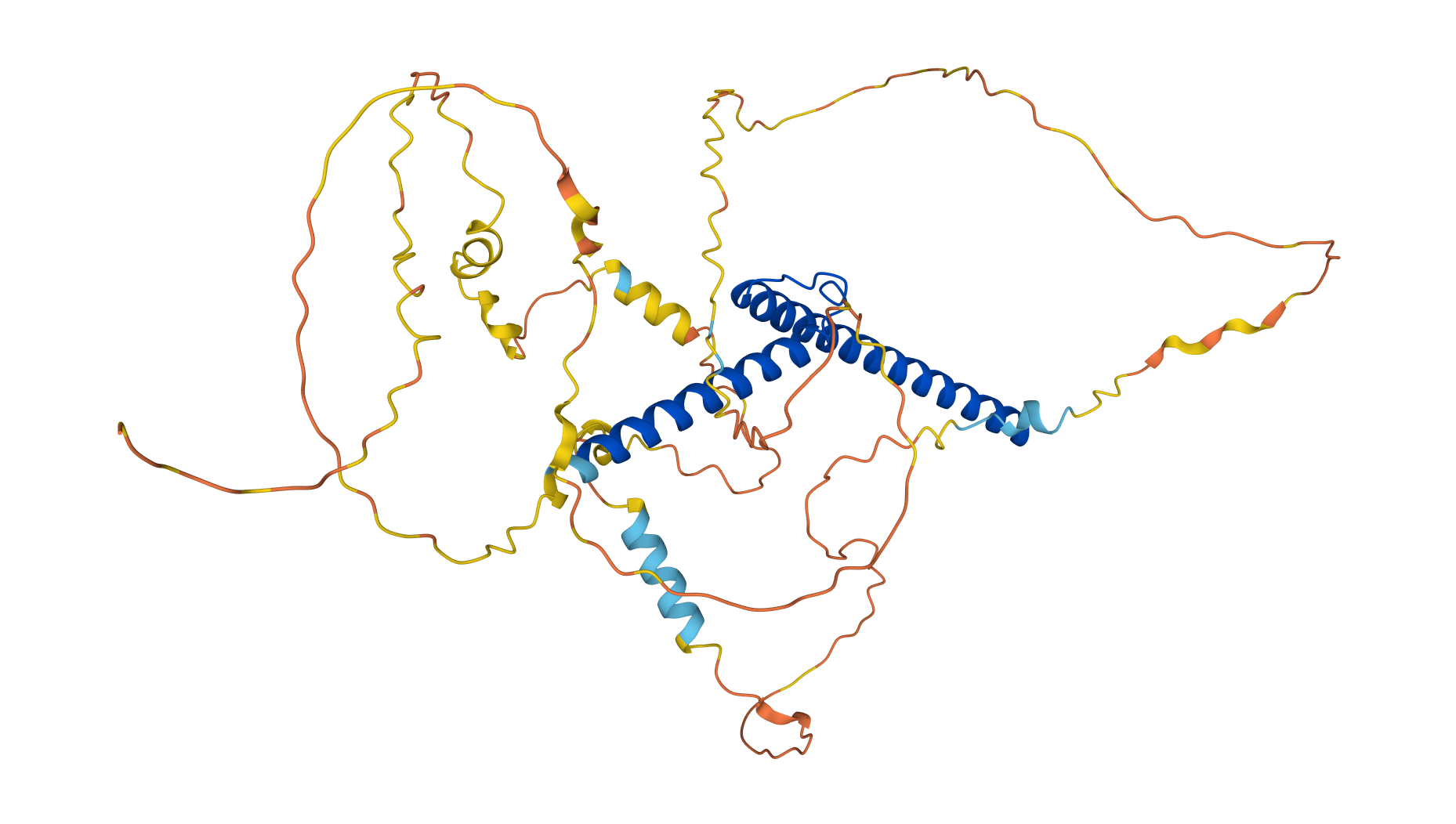

Identifiers
- Aliases: MYCN, MODED, N-myc, NMYC, ODED, bHLHe37, v-myc avian myelocytomatosis viral oncogene neuroblastoma derived homolog, MYCN proto-oncogene, bHLH transcription factor, MYCNsORF, MYCNsPEP
- External IDs: OMIM: 164840; MGI: 97357; GeneCards: MYCN

Gene location (Human)
Chr.	Chromosome 2 (human)
Band	2p24.3	Start	15,940,550 bp
Band	2p24.3	End	15,947,007 bp

Gene location (Mouse)
Chr.	Chromosome 12 (mouse)
Band	12 A1.1|12 6.14 cM	Start	12,986,094 bp
Band	12 A1.1|12 6.14 cM	End	12,991,915 bp
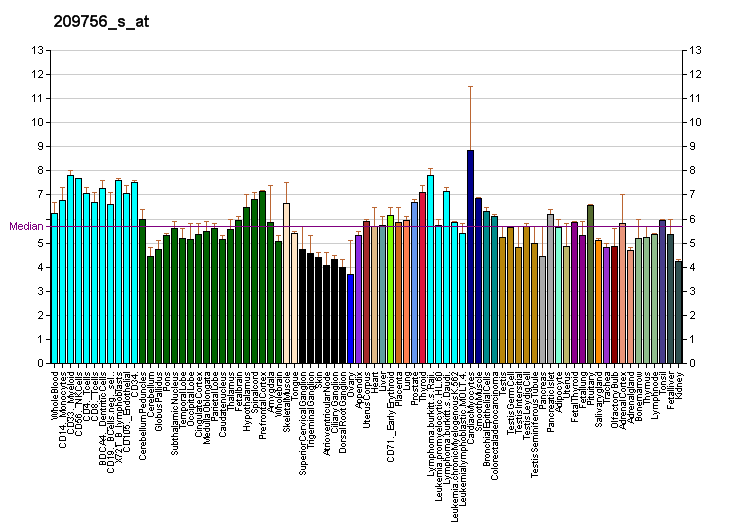

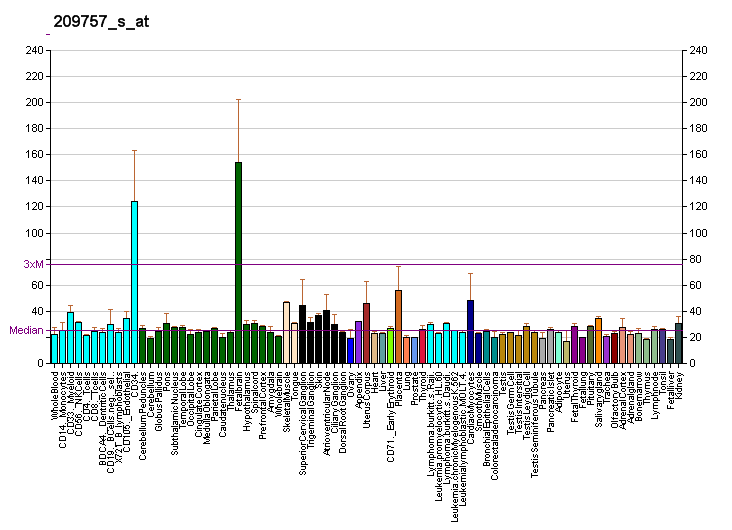

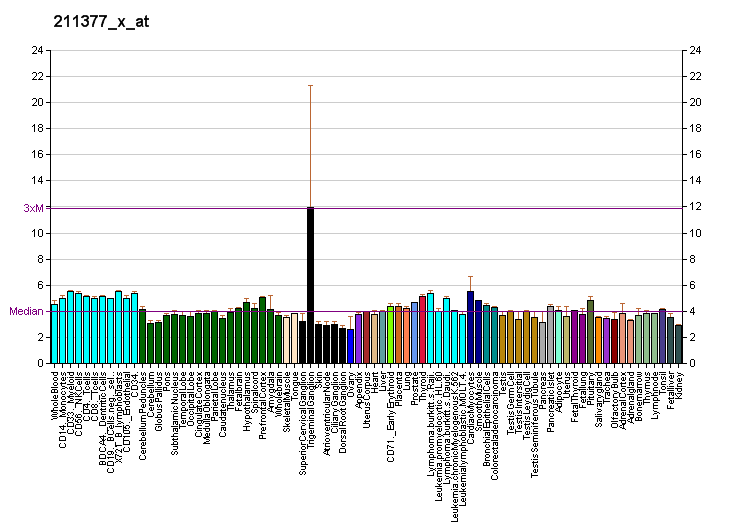
RNA expression pattern
Bgee	Human / Mouse (ortholog); Top expressed in: ventricular zone; embryo; ganglionic eminence; gonad; placenta; kidney tubule; testicle; middle temporal gyrus; decidua; Brodmann area 23 / Top expressed in: primitive streak; epiblast; hair follicle; medial ganglionic eminence; somite; ventricular zone; abdominal wall; mandibular prominence; maxillary prominence; superior cervical ganglion; More reference expression data
BioGPS	More reference expression data
Gene ontology
Molecular function	DNA binding; protein dimerization activity; DNA-binding transcription factor activity; protein binding; RNA polymerase II cis-regulatory region sequence-specific DNA binding; DNA-binding transcription activator activity, RNA polymerase II-specific; kinase binding; DNA-binding transcription factor activity, RNA polymerase II-specific
Cellular component	chromatin; nucleus; nucleolus
Biological process	regulation of transcription, DNA-templated; regulation of transcription by RNA polymerase II; transcription, DNA-templated; positive regulation of gene expression; negative regulation of gene expression; positive regulation of production of miRNAs involved in gene silencing by miRNA; transcription by RNA polymerase II; cartilage condensation; positive regulation of mesenchymal cell proliferation; positive regulation of cell population proliferation; positive regulation of cell death; lung development; embryonic digit morphogenesis; regulation of inner ear auditory receptor cell differentiation; positive regulation of transcription, DNA-templated; positive regulation of transcription by RNA polymerase II; embryonic skeletal system morphogenesis; negative regulation of astrocyte differentiation; branching morphogenesis of an epithelial tube; negative regulation of reactive oxygen species metabolic process
Sources:Amigo / QuickGO
Orthologs
Databases	NCBI: entry; OMA: entry
Species	Human	Mouse
Entrez	4613	18109
Ensembl	ENSG00000134323	ENSMUSG00000037169
UniProt	P04198	P03966
RefSeq (mRNA)	NM_005378; NM_001293228; NM_001293231; NM_001293233	NM_008709
RefSeq (protein)	NP_001280157; NP_001280160; NP_001280162; NP_005369	NP_032735
Location (UCSC)	Chr 2: 15.94 – 15.95 Mb	Chr 12: 12.99 – 12.99 Mb
PubMed search
- Wikidata
View/Edit Human	View/Edit Mouse

N-myc proto-oncogene protein also known as N-Myc or basic helix-loop-helix protein 37 (bHLHe37), is a protein that in humans is encoded by the MYCN gene.

== Function ==
The MYCN gene is a member of the MYC family of transcription factors and encodes a protein with a basic helix-loop-helix (bHLH) domain. This protein is located in the cell nucleus and must dimerize with another bHLH protein in order to bind DNA. N-Myc is highly expressed in the fetal brain and is critical for normal brain development.

The MYCN gene has an antisense RNA, N-cym or MYCNOS, transcribed from the opposite strand which can be translated to form a protein product. N-Myc and MYCNOS are co-regulated both in normal development and in tumor cells, so it is possible that the two transcripts are functionally related. It has been shown that the antisense RNA encodes for a protein, named NCYM, that has originated de novo and is specific to human and chimpanzee. This NCYM protein inhibits GSK3b and thus prevents MYCN degradation. Transgenic mice that harbor human MYCN/NCYM pair often show neuroblastomas with distant metastasis, which are atypical for normal mice. Thus NCYM represents a rare example of a de novo gene that has acquired molecular function and plays a major role in oncogenesis.

== Clinical significance ==
Amplification and overexpression of N-Myc can lead to tumorigenesis. Excess N-Myc is associated with a variety of tumors, most notably neuroblastomas where patients with amplification of the N-Myc gene tend to have poor outcomes. MYCN can also be activated in neuroblastoma and other cancers through somatic mutation. Intriguingly, recent genome-wide H3K27ac profiling in patient-derived NB samples revealed four distinct SE-driven epigenetic subtypes, characterized by their own and specific master regulatory networks. Three of them are named after the known clinical groups: MYCN-amplified, MYCN non-amplified high-risk, and MYCN non-amplified low-risk NBs, while the fourth displays cellular features which resemble multipotent Schwann cell precursors. Interestingly, the cyclin gene CCND1 was regulated through distinct and shared SEs in the different subtypes, and, more importantly, some tumors showed signals belonging to multiple epigenetic signatures, suggesting that the epigenetic landscape is likely to contribute to intratumoral heterogeneity.

== Interactions ==
N-Myc has been shown to interact with MAX.

N-Myc is also stabilized by aurora A which protects it from degradation. Drugs that target this interaction are under development, and are designed to change the conformation of aurora A. Conformational change in Aurora A leads to release of N-Myc, which is then degraded in a ubiquitin-dependent manner.

Being independent from MYCN/MAX interaction, MYCN is also a transcriptional co-regulator of p53 in MYCN-amplified neuroblastoma. MYCN alters transcription of p53 target genes which regulate apoptosis responses and DNA damage repair in cell cycle. This MYCN-p53 interaction is through exclusive binding of MYCN to C-terminal domains of tetrameric p53. As a post-translational modification, MYCN binding to C-terminal domains of tetrameric p53 impacts p53 promoter selectivity and interferes other cofactors binding to this region.

== See also ==
- Myc
