= Eye care in Ghana =

Eye care in Ghana is at an early stage of development, with fewer than 300 professionals serving a population of over 23 million.

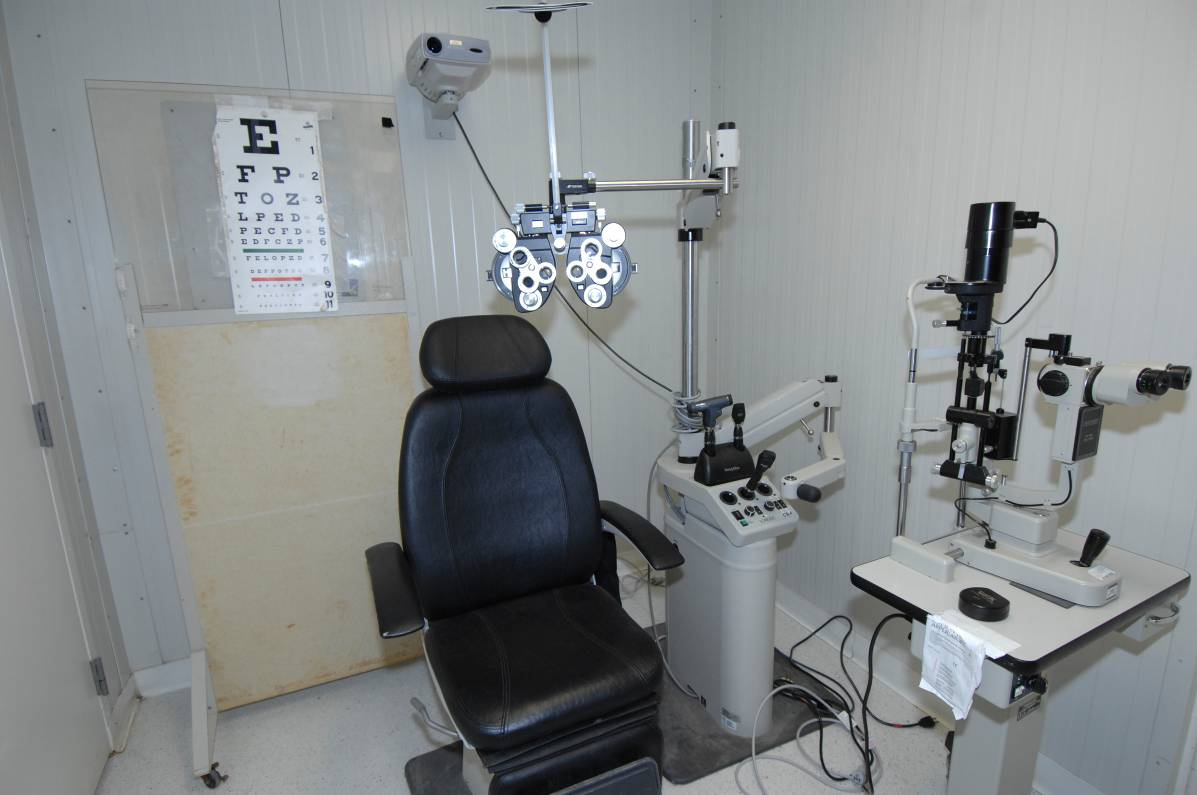
The general setup of an optometry clinic

== History ==
Since Ghana's independence on 6 March 1957, efforts have been made to improve the eye care services in the country. The main professional bodies championing this goal are the Ophthalmological Society of Ghana, Ophthalmic Nurses Group of Ghana and the Ghana Optometric Association.

== Regulatory bodies ==
=== Ophthalmological Society of Ghana (OSG) ===
The Ophthalmological Society of Ghana is a professional body of ophthalmologists that regulates the practice of ophthalmology in Ghana. At its inauguration in 1992, there were 15 members including several expatriates. As of 2011, their numerical strength has increased to 50 with at least five expatriates. Its objectives include promoting good eye health in Ghana and maintaining professional standards in ophthalmology. Its activities include organising continuing medical education for their members and collaborating with each other and members of other ophthalmological societies worldwide to improve patient care. The OSG is associated with the Illinois College of Optometry, the American Academy of Ophthalmology, and the World Glaucoma Association.

=== Ghana Optometric Association ===
The Ghana Optometric Association (GOA) is the country's governing body for the optometry profession. Since 2009, optometrists seeking membership have been required to pass a professional exam, after which certification to practice optometry is awarded. The association has about 200 members. In 2010, the Ghana Optometric Association along with the Kwame Nkrumah University of Science and Technology's Faculty of Distance Learning rolled out a two-year programme to offer members of GOA without a Doctor of Optometry degree to obtain the qualification.

=== Nursing and Midwifery Council of Ghana ===
The Nursing and Midwifery Council of Ghana is the statutory body that regulates ophthalmic nursing practice in Ghana. The Ophthalmic Nurses Group of Ghana is a professional body that represents ophthalmic nurses nationwide. The group has about 500 members across the country. They serve as first point of contact in eye care and collaborate with other health care professionals to provide eye care services to the population.

== Services ==
The Ministry of Health through its hospitals and health facilities is the main provider of eye care services in the country. It has introduced initiatives to train more eye care professionals through the various universities, teaching hospitals, nursing schools, training schools, etc. The aim of the Ministry of Health is to ensure that there is at least one functioning eye unit in every district of the country. Despite these efforts, access to eyecare in Ghana remains limited due to the low ratio of eye care professionals per to the population. The Christian Health Association of Ghana (CHAG) also supports service delivery, providing about 35 per cent of the country’s health care. Many CHAG facilities operate eye clinics, which extend services to towns and rural communities.

The services provided by eye care professionals in Ghana include:

- Cataract surgery
- Glaucoma surgery
- Refraction
- Rehabilitative care

The chart below shows the number of eye care professionals in the various regions and also the progress made to restore sight to people with cataracts in 2005.

=== 2005 Eye report of Ghana ===
==== Eye care personnel ====
| Region | Population | Ophthalmologist | Optometrist | Ophthalmic nurse |
|---|---|---|---|---|
| Eastern | 2,079,483 | 4 | 25 | 22 |
| Greater Accra | 3,451,887 | 20 | 23 | 55 |
| Western | 2,186,539 | 2 | 2 | 1 |
| Central | 1,559,248 | 2 | 2 | 17 |
| Volta | 1,763,300 | 2 | 3 | 18 |
| Ashanti | 4,115,881 | 6 | 7 | 30 |
| Brong Ahafo | 2,003,892 | 2 | 2 | 21 |
| Northern | 2,033,464 | 1 | 1 | 12 |
| Upper East | 961,247 | 2 | 1 | 21 |
| Upper West | 616,441 | 1 | 0 | 12 |
| National | 20,771,382 | 42 | 63 | 216 |

==== Cataract Surgeries ====
| Region | Total Cataract Operation | With IOL | Without IOL | CSR |
|---|---|---|---|---|
| Eastern | 886 | 886 | 0 | 443 |
| Greater Accra | 2,716 | 2,716 | 0 | 799 |
| Western | 172 | 172 | 0 | 86 |
| Central | 1,359 | 1,359 | 0 | 849 |
| Volta | 1,016 | 1,016 | 0 | 564 |
| Ashanti | 1,022 | 1,022 | 0 | 255 |
| Brong Ahafo | 901 | 901 | 0 | 450 |
| Northern | 559 | 548 | 11 | 247 |
| Upper East | 1910 | 1844 | 66 | 1989 |
| Upper West | 377 | 356 | 21 | 608 |
| National | 10,918 | 10,820 | 98 | 524 |

=== Western Ghana ===
Despite a population of more than 2.1 million, the eighteen districts in Ghana's Western Region are among the least resourced in terms of eyecare services. Professional eye care services are available in four districts, Wassa West, Bibiani/Anhwiaso/Bekwai, Ahanta West and Shama Ahanta East Metropolitan.

In 2005 there were five eye care specialists in the region, comprising two ophthalmologists, two optometrists, one optician and one ophthalmic nurse. Specialists practised at the Imperial Eye Care Centre and the SAEMA district hospital in Takoradi, as well as the government hospitals in Tarkwa and Dixcove. Additional support was provided by the region's 106 general practitioners. International assistance has included Operation Eyesight Universal, which funds three district hospital satellite eye clinics in the Western Region.

== Training schools ==
=== Ophthalmologists ===
Teaching hospitals in Ghana train medical doctors in ophthalmology for a period of three to five years. In total, a minimum of ten years of education and training is required from the undergraduate level to qualification as an ophthalmologist.

=== Optometrists ===
The first optometrist school in Ghana started at the Department of Physics, Kwame Nkrumah University of Science and Technology in 1992. The first class had five students and were under the tutelage of Ghana's first optometrist, Dr. K Monny. Admission was limited to only to graduates who had their first degrees in Biochemistry, Physics or Biology. Graduates from the school were awarded the Postgraduate Diploma in Optometry (Pg. Dip. Optometry). In 2000, a four-year Bachelor of Science Degree programme was introduced to replace the Pg. Dip. Optometry programme and also accelerate the training of more eye care professionals in Ghana. In 2004, the first batch of BSc graduates were enrolled for a two-year Doctor of Optometry (O.D) programme, which they completed in 2007. The University of Cape Coast also began its Doctor of Optometry programme in 2002, enrolling five students, who graduated alongside the 2008 batch of O.Ds from KNUST. There are about two hundred optometrists in Ghana working with other health care professionals to provide eye care services.

=== Ophthalmic nurses ===
Trained nurses who wish to specialise in ophthalmic nursing undertake a one-year post-basic programme in eye care at the Korle-Bu Teaching Hospital. The training includes detection of eye conditions, managing common eye diseases, referring patients to appropriate specialists and assisting ophthalmologists during surgery.

=== Opticians ===
Ghana's only optician training school is located in Oyoko, in the New Juaben district of the Ashanti Region. Secondary school graduates who qualify undertake a three-year training programme in lens glazing and fitting, optics and related courses to qualify as an optician. They work closely with optometrists in refraction and refractive therapy.

== Major eye conditions ==
Several ocular conditions are treated in Ghana, including those requiring laser surgery. In some cases, patients may be referred outside the country for specialised care. The most common eye conditions in Ghana include:

- Refractive errors
- Cataracts
- Diabetic Retinopathy
- Hypertensive Retinopathy
- Glaucoma
- Bacterial Infections
- Viral Infections
- Agricultural injuries to the eye
- Trauma
- HIV/AIDS associated ocular complications
- Sickle cell retinopathy
- Allergic conjunctivitis

=== Glaucoma ===
Ghana is ranked second worldwide in the prevalence of glaucoma. An estimated 600,000 Ghanaians are affected by the disease, of whom abour 30,000 are at risk of going blind if left untreated. The statistics indicate that 8.5 percent of people above 40 years and 7.7 percent of people above 30 years have glaucoma. The Ghana Health Service (GHS), the government agency responsible for health care administration and delivery in the country, introduced programmes aimed at improving the eye care system in the country. In 2008, World Glaucoma Day was observed under the theme "Eyes on the Future - Fight Vision Impairment in Later Life Now". In Ghana, only ophthalmologists and optometrists are licensed to manage glaucoma.

== See also ==
- Optometry in Ghana
- Department of Optometry, KNUST
- Optometry, UCC, Ghana
