= Ghana Optometric Association =

- GOA
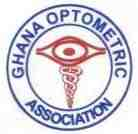

Agency overview
- Formed: 1997
- Jurisdiction: Republic of Ghana
- Headquarters: Accra, Greater Accra, (Ghana)
- Agency executives: Prof.Samuel Bert Boadi Kusi, (President); Dr.Alfred Gardemor, (Vice President); Dr. Yaw Osei Akoto, (National Secretary)
- Parent agency: Ministry of Health (Ghana)
- Website: ghanaoptometryassociation.org

The Ghana Optometric Association (GOA) is the professional body responsible for the development of the optometry profession in Ghana.

== History ==
The association was formed in 1997 to unite the optometry professionals as well as provide a united front to promote the activities of member.

== Executives ==
Five executives lead the GOA. It is headed by the late Dr. Julius Darko as president of GOA, then subsequently Dr. Samuel O. Asiedu. Supt.Dr. Remi Ninkpe is the immediate past president.Prof Samuel Bert Boadi Kusi is the current president

== Activities ==
The association in 2009 passed a resolution mandating all optometrists wanting to be members to write a professional exam. Upon successfully passing the exam, the certification required to practice optometry in Ghana is awarded. The group has about 200 members. In 2010, the Ghana Optometric Association along with the Kwame Nkrumah University of Science and Technology's Faculty of Distance Learning rolled out a two-year program to offer all members of GOA who did not have the Doctor of Optometry degree to enroll for it.

== See also ==
- Eyecare in the Western Region (Ghana)
- Optometry in Ghana
- Optometry in the Western Region (Ghana)
- Department of Optometry, KNUST
- Optometry, UCC, Ghana
