= Van Charles Lansingh =

Mexican ophthalmologist and public health expert

- Born: Mexico City, Mexico
- Citizenship: Mexican
- Education: University of Melbourne
- Occupation: Ophthalmologist
- Medical career
- Research: Ophthalmology, Public Health

Van Charles Lansingh is a Mexican ophthalmologist, clinician-scientist and author, specialising in public health. He is currently a faculty at Mexican Institute of Ophthalmology (IMO), Querétaro, Mexico where he serves as Director, International Affairs. He is also a voluntary assistant professor of ophthalmology at the Miller School of Medicine at the University of Miami, and serves as the chief medical officer at HelpMeSee, a global non-profit training organization.

== Early life and education ==
Lansingh completed his residency in ophthalmology from the Universidad Nacional Autónoma de Mexico in Mexico City, in 1987. Following this, he obtained his PhD from University of Melbourne in Australia. His thesis was on primary health care approach to trachoma control in Aboriginal communities in Central Australia.

== Career ==
He was appointed at the International Agency for the Prevention of Blindness as the regional coordinator in Latin America. He was appointed as chief medical officer at HelpMeSee, a global training organisation that aims to reduce the burden of cataract related blindness through training ophthalmologists using simulation-based technologies. He served as a reviewer to the World report on vision, published by the World Health Organization. Lansingh has authored over 130 peer-reviewed publications in medical journals and his papers have received over 75000 citations.

Lansingh regularly features in the top 2% of the most-cited researchers globally across all specialities (published annually by Elsevier).

== Awards and honors ==
- International Blindness Prevention awarded by the American Academy of Ophthalmology in 2016.
- Vision Excellence Award by the International Agency for the Prevention of Blindness.
- Benjamin F. Boyd Humanitarian Award by the Pan-American Congress of Ophthalmology in 2017.
- Kupfer Award by the Association for Research in Vision and Ophthalmology in 2019.
- Induction into Academia Ophthalmologica Internationalis, a university-centered international organisation with only 100 active chairs. The requirements for membership include active engagement in ophthalmology for at least 15 years and over 100 scientific papers published.

== Selected Books/Chapters ==
- Eyes: For Teachers and Health Workers
- Immediately Sequential Bilateral Cataract Surgery (ISBCS)
- Innovative Approaches in the Delivery of Primary and Secondary Eye Care
- International Encyclopedia of Public Health
- Primary Health Care Approach to Trachoma Control in Aboriginal Communities in Central Australia
- Eye Care Competency Framework by World Health Organization
- Maxcy-Rosenau - Last Public Health and Preventive Medicine: Sixteenth Edition
