= OAA =

OAA may refer to:

- Oakwood Adventist Academy
- Oceania Athletic Association
- Office of the Administrative Assistant to the Secretary of the Army
- Ohio Auctioneers Association
- Ohio Achievement Assessment
- Old Achimotans Association
- The Older Americans Act of 1965
- Oman Automobile Association, a member of the FIA
- One Ayala Avenue, a transport terminal in Makati, Philippines
- Ontario Association of Architects
- Open Adoption Agreement
- Open Agent Architecture
- Open Automotive Alliance, an organization to computerize cars
- Optically active additive, for use in paints and coatings
- Opticians Association of America
- Optometrists Association Australia
- Oriental Astronomical Association
- Orlando Apopka Airport
- Oxaloacetic acid
- Oxford Aviation Academy
- Oxley Aviation, Australia (ICAO operator designator)
- Ozark Adventist Academy
