= Arnall Patz =

American physician (1920–2010)

- Patz (right) with Helen Keller and V. Everett Kinsey (left) at 1956 Lasker Award ceremony
- Born: June 14, 1920; Elberton, Georgia, U.S.
- Died: March 11, 2010 (aged 89); Pikesville, Maryland, U.S.
- Education: Emory University (BA, MD); Johns Hopkins University (MLA)
- Known for: Reducing childhood blindness
- Spouse: Ellen Levy (m. 1950)
- Awards: Lasker-DeBakey Clinical Medical Research Award (1956); E. Mead Johnson Award (1956); Presidential Medal of Freedom (2004)
- Scientific career
- Fields: Medicine (Ophthalmology)
- Institutions: District of Columbia General Hospital; Johns Hopkins University

Arnall Patz (June 14, 1920 – March 11, 2010) was an American medical doctor and research professor at Johns Hopkins University. In the early 1950s, Patz discovered that oxygen therapy was the cause of an epidemic of blindness among some 10,000 premature babies. Following his discovery, there was a sixty percent reduction in childhood blindness in the United States. He also conducted pioneering research in the 1960s into the use of lasers in the treatment of retinal disorders. He received the Lasker Award in 1956 for his research into the causes and prevention of blindness and the Presidential Medal of Freedom in 2004 for his lifetime of work in the field of ophthalmology.

== Biography ==
=== Early years ===
Patz was born in Elberton, Georgia. His father was a Jewish immigrant from Lithuania, and Patz was the youngest of seven children in the only Jewish family in Elberton. He attended Emory University in Atlanta and received both bachelor's and medical degrees there.

After graduating from Emory University School of Medicine in 1945, Patz joined the U.S. Army and served at Walter Reed Army Medical Center. After leaving the military, Patz began a residency in ophthalmology at Gallinger Municipal Hospital (later known as District of Columbia General Hospital) in Washington, D.C.

=== Study of oxygen as cause of childhood blindness ===
While Patz was in training at Gallinger, he observed more than 20 infants who had developed severe retrolental fibroplasia after receiving continuous oxygen therapy. An epidemic of blindness among some 10,000 premature babies in the 1940s and the early 1950s became one of "the great medical mysteries of the postwar era." Patz hypothesized that there was a correlation between the high rate of blindness and the use of pure oxygen to treat premature babies. "It had become standard practice to put babies in incubators and crank up the oxygen," Patz said in a 2004 interview with the Baltimore Sun.

Patz proposed a clinical study to test his hypothesis, but the National Institutes of Health refused to fund the study on ethical grounds, fearing the study would "kill a lot of babies by anoxia to test a wild idea." Unable to obtain a grant, Patz borrowed money from his family to conduct a clinical study at Gallinger in the early 1950s. Patz conducted the study between 1951 and 1953 in conjunction with Leroy Hoeck (1911–2009), a pediatrician who was in charge of the newborn nursery at Gallinger. In the study, some infants were given concentrated oxygen, and others were given concentrated oxygen only if they showed signs of respiratory distress. The study confirmed Patz's suspicion as 12 infants on concentrated oxygen went blind while only one of the infants receiving normal oxygen went blind. Further study established that elevated oxygen levels caused abnormal growth of blood vessels in the eye, irreversibly damaging the retina. After Patz's findings became known, the use of high-dose oxygen therapy was limited, and there was a sixty percent reduction in childhood blindness in the United States.

=== Johns Hopkins ===
In 1955, Patz accepted a part-time faculty position at Johns Hopkins University while maintaining a private ophthalmology practice. In 1970, he joined the Johns Hopkins faculty on a full-time basis as a research professor. He served as the director of the Wilmer Eye Institute at Johns Hopkins from 1979 to 1989. He was also a founder of the Johns Hopkins' Retinal Vascular Center. In the late 1960s, Patz also conducted pioneering research on the use of lasers and collaborated with the Johns Hopkins Applied Physics Laboratory on the development of one of the first argon lasers used in the treatment of retinal disorders. Patz also worked with the Maryland Eye Bank, built an 80-foot radio tower at his home and "became known to ham-radio operators across the country for putting out word on the airwaves whenever corneas were needed for transplant."

=== Awards and accolades ===
In 1956, Patz and V. Everett Kinsey, a biochemist who worked with Patz on a larger study that confirmed Patz's findings, received the Lasker Clinical Medical Research Award. Helen Keller presented Patz and Kinsey with the award.

The Wall Street Journal called Patz the man who "helped solve the riddle of how 10,000 babies went blind." The New York Times credited him with "saving countless babies from blindness", and, through his research on the use of lasers, with "preserving the sight of adults with common conditions that cause blindness."

U.S. President George W. Bush awarded Patz the Presidential Medal of Freedom, the nation's highest civilian honor, in 2004. Patz was given the Presidential Medal of Freedom "for his lifetime contributions to the field of ophthalmology, including his discovery of the most common cause of childhood blindness in the early 1950s." At the time of the award, Bush called Patz "the man who has given to uncounted men, women and children the gift of sight."

Patz also served as president of the American Academy of Ophthalmology and wrote more than 250 scientific publications and four textbooks. He was also the recipient of the Friedenwald Research Award in 1980, the inaugural Isaac C. Michaelson Medal in 1986, the first Helen Keller prize for Vision Research in 1994, and the Pisart International Vision Award from the Lighthouse International in 2001.

=== Later years and death ===
In his later years, Patz studied the impact of deafness on Beethoven's music. He also received a master's degree in liberal arts from Johns Hopkins at age 78.

Patz died of heart disease in March 2010 at his home in Pikesville, Maryland. Patz died at age 89 one day before the 60th anniversary of his wedding to the former Ellen Levy.

In 2013, a biographical profile of Dr. Patz was included in a bestselling book called Saving Sight: An eye surgeon's look at life behind the mask and the heroes who changed the way we see, by Andrew Lam, M.D.

== Selected publications ==
=== Books ===
- Patz, Arnall; Hoover, Richard E. (1969). Protection of Vision in Children. Springfield, Illinois: Thomas Books. OCLC 279361.
- Fine, Stuart L.; Patz, Arnall; Orth, David H.; Dunker, Amalie P. (1976). Sights and Sounds in Ophthalmology, Vol. 2: Retinal Vascular Disorders. St. Louis: Mosby. ISBN 9780801637629. OCLC 954478221.
- Patz, Arnall; Fine, Stuart L. (1977). Interpretation of the Fundus Fluorescein Angiogram. Boston: Little, Brown. OCLC 3206372.

=== Articles ===
- Patz, Arnall (December 1965). "The Effects of Oxygen on Immature Retinal Vessels". Investigative Ophthalmology & Visual Science. 4 (6): 988–999.
- Patz, Arnall (April 1966). "Diabetic Blindness". Archives of Ophthalmology. 75 (4): 455–456. doi:10.1001/archopht.1966.00970050457001. PMID 5905197.
- Patz, Arnall (1967). "New Role of the Ophthalmologist in Prevention of Retrolental Fibroplasia". Archives of Ophthalmology. 78 (5): 565–568. doi:10.1001/archopht.1967.00980030567001. PMID 6072296.
- Patz, Arnall (June 1975). "The Role of Oxygen in Retrolental Fibroplasia". Albrecht von Graefes Archiv für Klinische und Experimentelle Ophthalmologie. 195 (2): 77–85. doi:10.1007/BF00417111. ISSN 0721-832X. PMC 1310320. PMID 4888959.
- Tasman, William; Patz, Arnall; McNamara, J. Arch; Kaiser, Richard S.; Trese, Michael T.; Smith, Bradley T. (October 10, 2005). "Retinopathy of Prematurity: The Life of a Lifetime Disease". American Journal of Ophthalmology. 141 (1): 167–174. doi:10.1016/j.ajo.2005.07.034. PMID 16386993.

== See also ==
- List of Presidential Medal of Freedom recipients
- Lasker-DeBakey Clinical Medical Research Award
