= Global access to cataract surgery =

Access to cataract surgery is very variable by country and region. Even in developed countries, availability may vary significantly between rural and more densely populated areas.

Cataract surgery is the removal of the natural lens of the eye that has developed a cataract, an opaque or cloudy area. The eye's natural lens is usually replaced with an artificial intraocular lens (IOL) implant.

Over time, metabolic changes of the crystalline lens fibres lead to the development of a cataract, causing impairment or loss of vision. Some infants are born with congenital cataracts, and environmental factors may lead to cataract formation. Early symptoms may include strong glare from lights and small light sources at night and reduced visual acuity at low light levels.

During cataract surgery, the cloudy natural lens is removed from the posterior chamber, either by emulsification in place or by cutting it out. An IOL is usually implanted in its place (posterior chamber IOL, or PCIOL), or less frequently in front of the chamber, to restore useful focus. Cataract surgery is generally performed by an ophthalmologist in an out-patient setting at a surgical centre or hospital. Local anaesthesia is normally used; the procedure is usually quick and causes little or no pain and minor discomfort. Recovery sufficient for most daily activities usually takes place in days, and full recovery about a month.

Well over 90% of operations are successful in restoring useful vision, and there is a low complication rate. Day care, high-volume, minimally invasive, small-incision phacoemulsification with quick post-operative recovery has become the standard of care in cataract surgery in the developed world. Manual small incision cataract surgery (MSICS), which is considerably more economical in time, capital equipment, and consumables, but provides comparable results, is popular in the developing world. Both procedures have a low risk of serious complications, and are the definitive treatment for vision impairment due to lens opacification.

The global health situation of cataracts is improving but this progress has not reduced the need for cataract surgery. Older people, women, and lower socioeconomic status are associated with higher untreated cataract numbers.

== General trends ==
Cataracts have the most uneven global distribution of non-communicable eye diseases, with the burden of cataracts more concentrated in countries with lower socioeconomic status. Blindness is also correlated with a lack of ophthalmologists, and density of ophthalmologists correlates with a higher national income. High-income countries had an average of 76.2 ophthalmologists, and low income countries an average of 3.7 ophthalmologists per million inhabitants. The countries with highest socioeconomic levels tend to have the best cataract surgery outcomes. Low income countries also tend to lack adequate training facilities for surgeons.

Cataract is globally the most common cause of blindness in people older than 50 years. It impairs vision and lowers quality of life. Improvements in vision help with daily activities, including work productivity and education. Cataract surgery reduces risk of falling and of dementia. It can prevent disability and is very cost effective, so it has large socioeconomic benefits, but the demand is great and the cost remains a large financial burden to public health systems.In addition to the direct costs, associated surgical complications may require further intervention. In high income countries the environmental costs also tend to be higher. A phacoemulsification surgery in a UK hospital was estimated to cost more than 20 times the greenhouse gas emission of an equivalent surgery in an Indian hospital.

== Africa ==
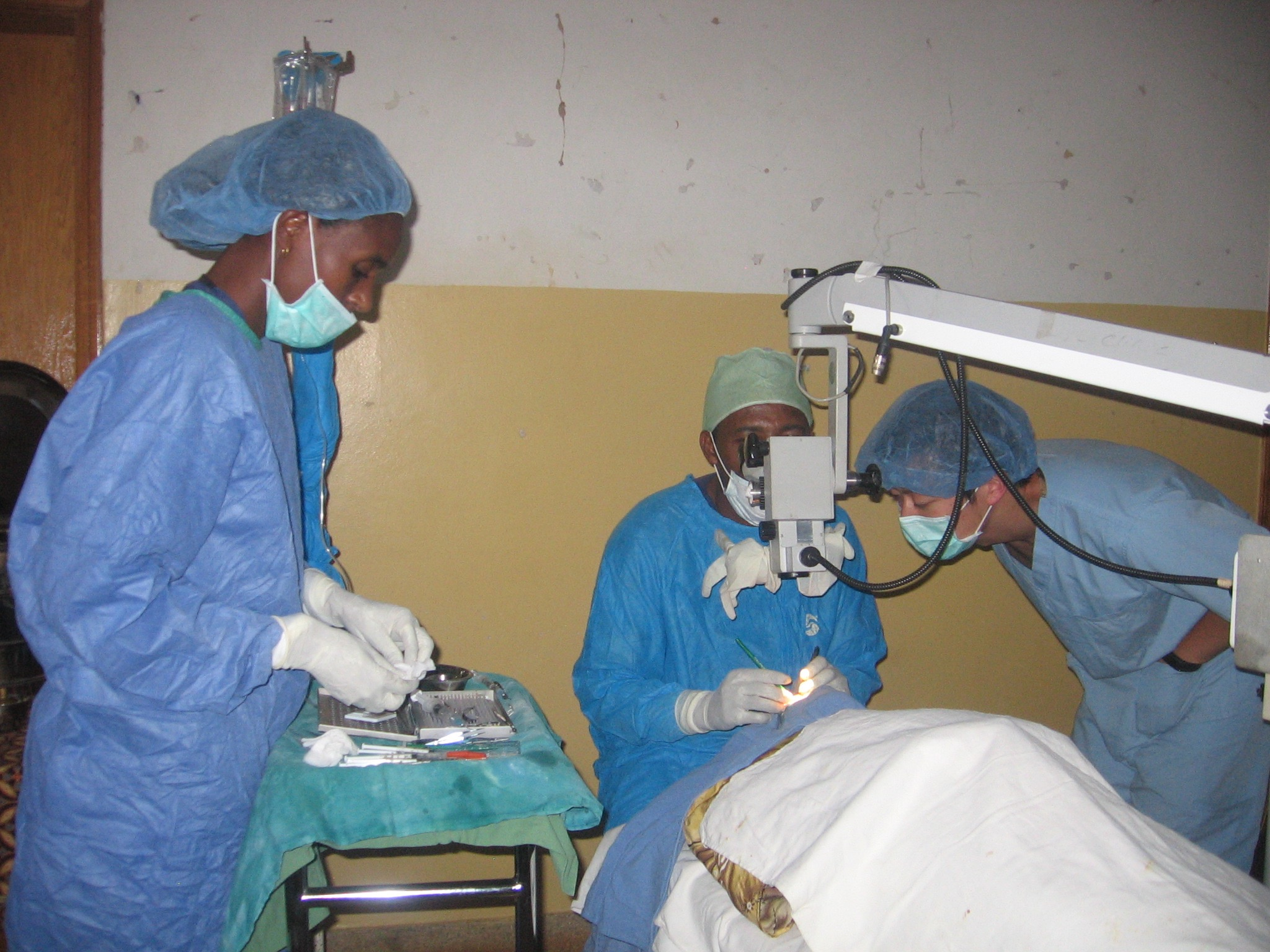
Cataract surgery in Bedele, Ethiopia

Cataracts are the main cause of blindness in Africa, and affect approximately half of the estimated seven million blind people on the continent, a number that is expected to increase with population growth by about 600,000 people per year. As of 2005, the estimated cataract-surgery rate was about 500 operations per million people per year. Progress on gathering information on epidemiology, distribution and impact of cataracts within the African continent has been made, but significant problems and barriers limiting further access to reliable data remain.

These barriers relate to awareness, acceptance, and cost; some studies also reported community and family dynamics as discouraging factors. Most of the studies held locally reported that cataract-surgical rate was lower in females. The higher cataract-surgery coverage found in some settings in South Africa, Libya, and Kenya suggest many barriers to surgery can be overcome.

According to the International Agency for the Prevention of Blindness, some sub-Saharan African countries have about one ophthalmologist per million people, while the National Center for Biotechnology Information stated the percentage of adults above the age of 50 in western sub-Saharan Africa who have developed cataract-induced blindness is about 6%—the highest rate in the world.A mathematical model using survey data from sub-Saharan Africa showed the incidence of cataracts varies significantly across the continent, with the required rate of surgery to maintain a visual acuity level of 6/18 (20/60) ranging from about 1,200 to about 4,500 surgeries per year per million people, depending on the area. Such variations may relate to genetic or cultural differences, as well as life expectancy.

=== Nigeria ===
In 2011, 0.78% of the population of Nigeria were blind; more than 43% of these developed the condition from cataracts, whereas another 9% was a result of aphakia and complications from couching performed by itinerant practitioners. Although there are about 2.8 ophthalmologists per million population in Nigeria, the cataract-surgery rate is only 300 operations per million per year (compared with the WHO recommendation of 3,000 per million per year). Reasons cited for this situation include inadequate blindness prevention programs, shortage of funding and lack of government-led investments in training and services. Teaching hospitals do not have enough patient-surgical load to support training.

=== South Africa ===
In South Africa, facilities vary from government hospitals, where subsidised operations for the disadvantaged may be charged at rates that cover the consumables, to private clinics in which up-to-date equipment is used and patients are charged at premium rates. Waiting times in government hospitals may be up to two years, whereas they are much shorter at private clinics. Some hospitals use a system in which two patients are operated upon for cataracts in the theatre at the same time, increasing the efficiency of facilities. Some charitable organisations in the country provide pro bono cataract surgery in rural areas by using mobile clinics.

As of 2023, the cataract-surgery rate in South Africa is less than half of the estimated requirement of at least 2,000 per million population per year needed to eliminate cataract blindness. In 2011, Lecuona and Cook identified an inadequate level of human resources in the public sector to provide care for the indigent population. The main barrier to increasing South Africa's rate of cataract surgery is inadequate surgery capacity: a higher annual rate of cataract surgeries by individual surgeons would improve cost effectiveness and personal skills, and also contribute towards an overall reduction of risk.

== Asia ==
South Asia has the highest global age-standardized prevalence of moderate-to-severe visual impairment (17.5%) and mild visual impairment (12.2%). The estimated distribution of ophthalmologists ranges from more than 114 per million of population in Japan, to none in Micronesia. Cataract has traditionally been a major cause of blindness in less-developed countries in the region, and in spite of improvements to the volume and quality of cataract surgeries, the success rate (CSR) remains low for some of these nations.

=== China ===
Cataracts are common in China; as of 2022, their estimated overall prevalence in Chinese people over 50 years old was 27.45%. The environment was an influential factor, with the prevalence being 28.79% in rural areas, and 26.66% in urban areas. Prevalence of cataract considerably varies by age group, as well: for ages 50–59, it is 7.88%; for ages 60–69, it is 24.94%; for ages 70–79, it is 51.74%; in people over 80 years old, it is 78.43%. The overall cataract-surgery coverage rate was 9.19%. The prevalence of cataract and cataract surgical coverage also significantly varies by region.

=== India ===
India's cataract-surgical rate rose from just over 700 operations per million people per year in 1981, to 6,000 per million per year in 2011, thus getting increasingly closer to the estimated requirement of 8,000–8,700 operations per million per year needed to eliminate cataract blindness in the country. The rate's rise was partly linked to factors such as increased efficiency due to improved surgical techniques, application of day-case surgery, improvements in operating theatre design, and efficient teamwork with sufficient staff.

In India, the pool of people applying for cataract surgery has been widened through social marketing methods aimed to raise awareness about the condition and access to effective surgical treatments. The non-governmental organization (NGO) sector and Indian ophthalmologists have developed methods to deal with several problems affecting local communities, including outreach camps to find those needing surgery, counsellors to explain the system, locally manufactured equipment and consumables, and a tiered pricing structure using subsidies where appropriate.

There have been occasional incidents in which several patients have been infected and developed endophthalmitis on the same day at some hospitals associated with eye camps in India. Journalists have reported blame being placed on the surgeons, the hospital administration, and other persons, but have not reported on those responsible for sterilizing the surgical instruments and operating theatres involved, whether all infections involved the same micro-organisms, the same theatres, or the same staff. One investigation found bacteria known to be associated with endophthalmia in the theatre and in the eyes of affected patients, and it was claimed the hospital had not followed the required protocol for infection control, but the investigation was ongoing and no findings were reported. Several instances of surgeons performing more operations per day than officially allowed have been reported, but the effects upon sterility of equipment or plausible infection pathways have not been explained.

In 2022, digital news portal Scroll.in contacted the Ministry of Health and Family Welfare, requesting official data on the number of patients who had contracted infections following surgery; according to their researches, since 2006, 469 people had either been blinded in one eye or had their vision seriously affected after undergoing surgery at eye camps. Further inquiries found at least 519 patients were involved, but the total number of surgeries for that period was not mentioned. As of 2017, India is claimed to be performing about 6.5 million cataract surgeries per year, more than the US, Europe and China together.

== Europe ==
About 4.5 million cataract surgeries were done in the EU Member States in 2016. The rate of surgeries generally varied between 12000 and 4000 per million inhabitants. The highest rate was in Portugal, at 14000 per million and the lowest were Ireland and Slovakia at 2000 per million. The figures are not altogether comparable, as in some countries only surgeries at hospitals are included in the counts. The proportion of out-patient surgeries increased in almost all EU states between 2011 and 2016.

=== United Kingdom ===
In the UK, the practice of NHS healthcare providers referring people with cataracts to surgery widely varied as of 2017; many of the providers were only referring patients with moderate or severe vision loss, often with delays. This practise occurred despite guidance issued by the NHS Executive in 2000, which urged providers to standardize care, streamline the process and increase the number of cataract surgeries performed, to meet the needs of the aging population. In 2019, the national ophthalmology outcomes audit found five NHS trusts had complication rates of between 1.5% and 2.1%: however, since the first national cataract audit (held in 2010), there had been a 38% reduction in posterior capsule rupture complications.

== Latin America ==
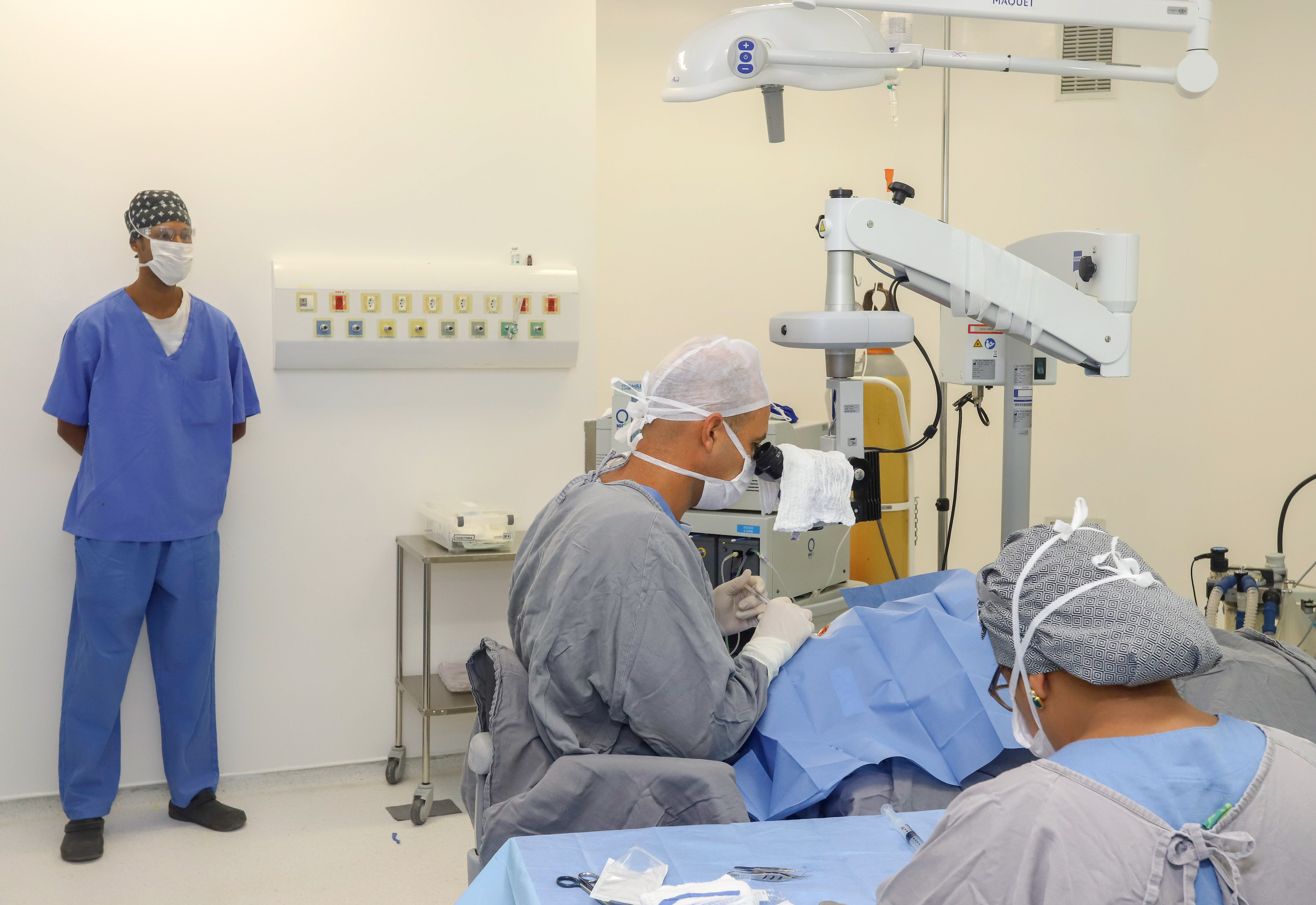
Cataract operation in São Paulo, Brazil

A four-year longitudinal study of 19 Latin American countries published in 2010 showed most of the countries had increased their surgery rates over that period, with increases of up to 186%, but still failed to provide adequate surgical coverage. The study also shown a significant correlation between gross national income per capita and cataract-surgery rate in the countries involved.

In a study published in 2014, the weighted-mean regional surgery rate was found to have increased by 70% from 2005 to 2012, rising from 1,562 to 2,672 cataract surgeries per million inhabitants. The weighted mean number of ophthalmologists per million inhabitants in the region was approximately 62. Cataract-surgery coverage widely varied across Latin America, ranging from 15% in El Salvador, to 77% in Uruguay. Barriers cited included cost of surgery and lack of awareness about available surgical treatment. The number of available ophthalmologists appeared to be adequate, but the number of those who practised eye surgery was unknown.

A 2009 study showed that the prevalence of cataract blindness in people 50 years and older ranged from 0.5% in Buenos Aires, to 2.3% in parts of Guatemala. Poor vision due to cataracts ranged from 0.9% in Buenos Aires, to 10.7% in parts of Peru. Cataract-surgical coverage ranged from good in parts of Brazil to poor in Paraguay, Peru, and Guatemala. Visual outcome after cataract surgery was close to conformity with WHO guidelines in Buenos Aires, where more than 80% of post-surgery eyes had visual acuity of 6/18 (20/60) or better, but ranged between 60% and 79% in most of the other regions, and was less than 60% in Guatemala and Peru.

== North America ==
=== United States ===
As of 2011, cataract surgery is the most frequently performed surgical procedure in the United States, with 1.8 million Medicare beneficiaries undergoing the procedure in 2004. This rate is expected to increase as the population ages.
