= IVORC Academic Foundation =

IVORC Academic Foundation (International Virtual Ophthalmic Research Center) is a nonprofit academic organization dedicated to advancing research, education, and scholarly communication in vision sciences. The foundation supports international collaboration among clinicians, researchers, and educators through scientific publishing, educational initiatives, and research networking.

== Journals ==
The IVORC Academic Foundation publishes two quarterly peer-reviewed open-access journals in the field of vision science. Medical Hypothesis, Discovery & Innovation in Ophthalmology (established since 2012) covers research and scholarly developments in ophthalmology, while Medical Hypothesis, Discovery & Innovation in Optometry (established since 2020) focuses on optometry. Both journals provide a platform for the dissemination of scientific research and advancements in their academic disciplines.

IVORC adheres to the publication ethics guidelines of the ICMJE and COPE and is an official member of CLOCKSS, a trusted digital archiving service that ensures the long-term preservation, accessibility, and stability of its affiliated publications.

=== Medical Hypothesis, Discovery & Innovation in Ophthalmology ===
Medical Hypothesis, Discovery & Innovation in Ophthalmology
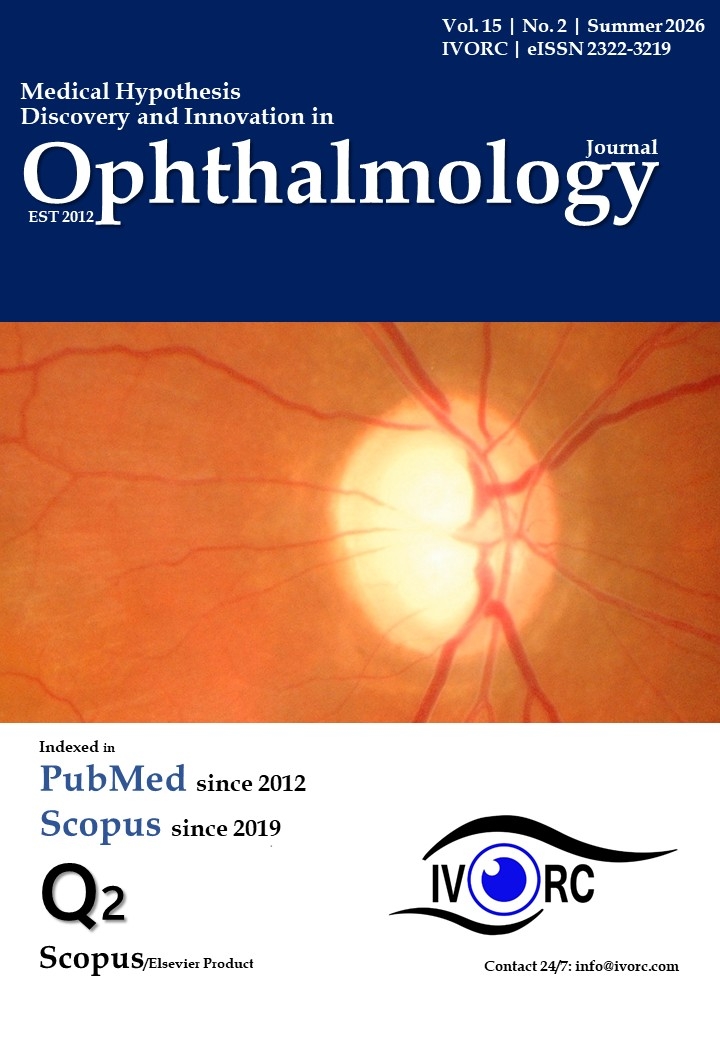
- Medical Hypothesis, Discovery & Innovation in Ophthalmology
- Discipline: Ophthalmology
- Language: English
- Edited by: Fatemeh Heidary

Publication details
- History: 2012–present
- Publisher: International Virtual Ophthalmic Research Center (United States)
- Frequency: Quarterly
- Open access: Yes
- License: CC-BY-NC-SA 4.0

Standard abbreviations
- ISO 4: Med. Hypothesis Discov. Innov. Ophthalmol.

Indexing
- CODEN: MHDICK
- ISSN: 2322-4436 (print); 2322-3219 (web)
- LCCN: 2014236572
- OCLC no.: 1158205168

Links
- Journal homepage; Online archive

Medical Hypothesis, Discovery & Innovation in Ophthalmology is a quarterly peer-reviewed open access medical journal covering ophthalmology. It was established in 2012 by Fatemeh Heidary. The journal was published from 2012 to 2015 by MEPTIC and in January 2015 transferred to the International Virtual Ophthalmic Research Center (IVORC Academic Foundation).

The journal is abstracted and indexed in PubMed, Chemical Abstracts Service, Embase, ProQuest databases, and Scopus (Q2).
