= Association of Malaysian Optometrists =

The Association of Malaysian Optometrists (AMO) is the non-governmental non-profit professional body of eye care professionals in vision sciences representing optometrists in Malaysia, with over 1,000 active members nationwide. It works to support the development of the optometry profession through professional representation, continuing education, and the improvement of vision care standards in Malaysia. AMO also contributes to advancing the quality and consistency of eye care services across the country. In 2022, the AMO signed an academic collaboration agreement with the Medical Hypothesis, Discovery & Innovation in Optometry journal.
