= Department of Optometry and Visual Science (KNUST) =

The Department of Optometry at Kwame Nkrumah University of Science and Technology, is based in Kumasi, Ghana. Its placement is under the College of Science of the university. It is the smallest department of the college with 10 teaching staff and around 210 students

== The Early Days ==
As the first optometrist school in Ghana was started at the department of Physics, Kwame Nkrumah University of Science and Technology in 1992. The first class had just five students and were under the tutelage of Ghana's first Optometrist, Dr. Kofivi Morny. It was opened to only to those who had had their first degrees in either Biochemistry, Physics or Biology. Graduates from the school were awarded the Postgraduate Diploma in Optometry (Pg. Dip. Optometry).

== Later On ==
In 2003, the department moved from the Physics block to the Biology block. In 2002, a four-year Bachelor of Science Degree program, to be followed by a two-year doctoral program, was started to replace the earlier program. In 2003, when the last Pg. Dipl. in Optometrists graduated, there were 53 Optometrists in Ghana. In 2006, just as the first batch of Optometrists with the BSc. Degree had graduated, they were enrolled for the two-year Doctor of Optometry (O.D.) program. They went on to finish with their doctorate degrees in 2008. More than eighty percent of Ghanaian Optometrists have had their training from the KNUST.

== Currently ==
In August 2010, the department finally received its own permanent address as it moved into the multi-million cedi Science Complex Block. The department was allotted permanent classrooms and offices for students and staff members respectively. The 2011 batch who have yet to graduate have are fifty-three. Dr. Dr. Angela O. Amedo, a member of the first batch of Optometrists produced in Ghana, is the Head of Department for Optometry at KNUST. But currently the Head of Department of optometry and visual science is Dr. Nana Yaa Koomson.

Today, there are about two hundred Optometrist in Ghana working hand-in-hand with other eyecare professionals to save sight.

== Staff of the Department ==
As of January 2011, the department had twelve members of staff overall, with 8 teachers, 2 secretaries, a janitorial custodian, and a driver. All members of teaching staff possess a Doctorate of Optometry. Currently four are pursuing other programs at the Masters level and one is pursuing a Doctorate of Philosophy.boom

== Social Responsibilities ==
The department in collaboration with the International Centre for Eyecare Education (now Brien Holden Vision Institute) in May, 2010 established an eye clinic at Ayeduase as a suburb of Kumasi. The center—called the Ashanti Vision Centre is to serve the community as well as the satellite towns that surround the university. Students go there regularly to build up their skills as well as offer their services to the numerous people who come for eyecare services. In November 2010 the whole sixth year class of the department undertook a two-day intensive vision outreach program in the Atebubu district of the Brong-Ahafo Region of Ghana.

In March 2011, volunteers from Vision Aid Overseas visited the department to teach its students as well as embark on Outreaches to cocoa growing areas of the Ashanti Region.

== See also ==
- Optometry, UCC, Ghana
- Ghanaian Optician
- Eyecare in Ghana
