= Ayeduase =

- Town
- Location of Ayeduase in Ashanti Region, South Ghana
- Coordinates: 6°40′30″N 1°33′34″W
- Country: Ghana
- Region: Ashanti Region
- District: Oforikrom Municipal District
- Elevation: 262 m (860 ft)

Population
  - Total: 29,748 in 2,015
- Time zone: GMT
  - Summer (DST): GMT

Ayeduase is a town in the Oforikrom Municipality in the Ashanti Region of Ghana, located approximately 7.3 kilometres from the centre of Kumasi. The town functions as both a residential and commercial hub, serving local inhabitants as well as students from the nearby Kwame Nkrumah University of Science and Technology. Its proximity to Kwame Nkrumah University of Science and Technology makes it a popular area for student housing and businesses that cater to the university community. Ayeduase is situated near the suburbs of Kotei and Boadi.
