= International Agency for the Prevention of Blindness =

Global alliance of eye health organisations

The International Agency for the Prevention of Blindness
- Formation: January 1, 1975; 51 years ago
- Type: International nongovernmental organization
- Purpose: Global prevention of blindness and vision impairment
- Headquarters: 4-108, Devonshire Square; London
- President: Caroline Casey
- Vice President: Babar Qureshi
- Treasurer: Debra Davis
- Chief Executive: Peter Holland
- Affiliations: WHO; International Council of Ophthalmology; World Council of Optometry; International Coalition for Trachoma Control; NTD NGDO Network
- Website: www.iapb.org

The International Agency for the Prevention of Blindness (IAPB) is a global alliance of eye health organisations working for the prevention of blindness and vision impairment. IAPB was established in 1975 to work as an umbrella body for global blindness prevention activities. This agency is a partner of World Health Organization.

In 1999, IAPB and the World Health Organization launched Vision 2020: The Right to Sight, a global initiative to eliminate avoidable blindness, which has achieved some success, though it did not meet all its goals.

Also known as: Agenzia internazionale per la prevenzione della cecità, Organisation mondiale contre la cécité, Organismo Internacional de Prevención de la Ceguera, and உலக கண்ணொளி தினம்.

== History ==
IAPB was established on 1 January 1975 by the International Council of Ophthalmology and the World Blind Union with input from the WHO, to coordinate global efforts to tackle and eliminate avoidable blindness. Sir John Wilson was its founder president. The founder members of IAPB included the International Council of Ophthalmology, the World Council for the Welfare of the Blind (later renamed the World Blind Union), the American Foundation for the Blind (later renamed Helen Keller International) and the Royal Commonwealth Society for the Blind (later renamed Sight Savers International).

IAPB has an official relationship with the WHO Program for Prevention of Blindness and Deafness, which is based in Geneva, Switzerland. In 1978, IAPB helped to set up a blindness prevention unit at the WHO. In 1999, with the WHO, they launched Vision 2020: The Right to Sight. In 2016, the IAPB published the Vision Atlas, bringing together causes and prevalence data on blindness and vision impairment. It showed that over a billion people in the developing world cannot see well because they have no access to spectacles.

== Purposes ==
The IAPB is an implementing and advocacy NGO. It advocates globally for eye health to encourage the attention and resources needed to achieve universal access to eye care. It builds partnerships to generate change at local and international level, and provides information on eye health to enable the development of good policy and practice, including publishing resources in journal, books and a website.

== Organisational members ==
It has over 150 members, mainly NGOs and civil society, corporate organisations, professional bodies and research institutions who are working in the prevention of blindness.

- World Health Organization
- Members of the Partnership Committee:
  - Al-Noor Eye Foundation
  - Asian Foundation for the Prevention of Blindness
  - Associates for World Action in Rehabilitation and Education
  - Christoffel Blindenmission eV
  - The Eye Tech Foundation
  - Federation lnternationale des Associations Catholiques d'Aveugles
  - Foresight
  - Foundation Dark and Light
  - The Fred Hollows Foundation
  - Health for Humanity
  - Helen Keller Worldwide
  - HelpAge International
  - Hong Kong Society for the Blind
  - InFOCUS
  - International Association of Contact Lens Educators
  - International Eye Foundation
  - Lighthouse International
  - Lions Clubs International Foundation
  - Mekong Eye Doctors
  - Nadi al Bassar
  - Norwegian Association of the Blind and Partially Sighted
  - Oeil sur les Tropiques
  - Operation Eyesight Universal
  - ORBIS International
  - Organizacion Nacional de Ciegos de Espana
  - Organisation pour la Prevention de la Cecite
  - Overbrook School for the Blind
  - Perkins School for the Blind
  - SENSE
  - Seva Foundation
  - Sight Savers International
  - Swedish Association of the Visually Impaired
  - Swedish Organisation of Handicapped International Aid Foundation
  - Vision Aid Overseas
  - ZlEN Society for Blindness Prevention Overseas

== Activities ==
IAPB coordinates activities of more than 150 organizations in over 100 countries which cooperate to improve and ensure quality of eye care. These include professional bodies, non-governmental organizations, associations, foundations, and educational institutions. The most influential program as of 2023 was the global initiative Vision 2020: The Right to Sight, which has been followed by 2030 In Sight.

=== Vision 2020: The Right to Sight ===
The Vision 2020: The Right to Sight global campaign was launched on 18 February 1999 by IAPB and the World Health Organization (WHO). The initiative was intended to use improvements in disease control, human resource development and infrastructure development to promote "A world in which nobody is needlessly visually impaired, where those with unavoidable vision loss can achieve their full potential" by eliminating or reducing the main causes of avoidable blindness throughout the world by the year 2020. Programs instituted under Vision 2020 facilitated the planning, development, and implementation of sustainable national eye care programs, including technical support and advocacy. Vision 2020 was based on a plan published by the WHO in 1999, and subsequently superseded by other global action plans from the WHO.

The goal of Vision 2020 was to reduce the projected number of blind people in 2020 from 75 million to 25 million, by disease prevention and control, personnel training, eye care infrastructure improvement, use of appropriate and affordable technology and mobilisation of resources. The conditions which were identified as priorities were cataract, childhood blindness, onchocerciasis, trachoma, and uncorrected refractive errors.

The 1998 World Health Report published an estimate of 19.34 million people who are bilaterally blind due to age-related cataracts, which was 43% of all causes of blindness. This number and proportion were expected to increase due to population growth and increased life expectancy approximately doubling the population in the over 60 years age group. The global increase in blindness from cataract is estimated at at least 5 million per year, and a figure of 1000 new cases per million population per year is used for planning purposes. The average outcomes of cataract surgery are improving over time, and consequently the stage at which surgery is indicated is becoming earlier, which also increases the number of operable cases. It is necessary to operate on more eyes per year than the new cases alone to reduce the backlog.

The rate of surgeries in the economically developed countries as of 1998 was about 4000 to 6000 per million population per year, which was sufficient to meet the demand. India raised the CSR to over 3000, but this does not seem to be sufficient to reduce the backlog. The middle income countries of Latin America and Asia have CSRs of between 500 and 2000 per million per year, and China, most of Africa and the poorer countries of Asia had rates of less than 500. In India and South East Asia the rate required to keep up with the increase is at least 3000 per million population per year, and in Africa and other parts of the word with smaller percentages of older people, a rate of 2000 may be sufficient for the short term.

The Vision 2020 initiative succeeded in bringing the issue of avoidable blindness to the global health agenda. The causes have not been eliminated, but there have been significant changes to the distribution of the causes, which can be attributed to global demographic shifts. Remaining challenges to management of avoidable blindness include population size, gender disparities in access to eyecare, and the available professional workforce.

It has been estimated that there were 43.3 million blind people in 2020, and 295 million with moderate and severe visual impairment (MSVI), 55% female. The age-standardised global prevalence in blindness decreased by 28.5% between 1990 and 2020, but the age-standardised prevalence of MSVI increased by 2.5%. The global leading cause of blindness in 2020 remained cataract.

By March 2022, 14 countries had reported achieving elimination goals for trachoma, but it remains hyperendemic in parts of rural Africa, Central and South America, Asia, Australia and the Middle East. Africa is still the continent most affected, and in which efforts to control the disease remain most intensive. Some mathematical models suggest that it may be possible to achieve this goal over the next decade.

Onchocerciasis has been eradicated in Colombia, Ecuador, Guatemala and Mexico, and significantly reduced in parts of Africa. Eradication appears to be possible and a new target for elimination has been set for 2025.

Childhood blindness was found to be poorly represented in epidemiological data, which may underestimate the extent, and there is a need for improvement. Nevertheless recent estimates show a gradual decline in the rates. A need to increase the focus on primary healthcare and prevention to ensure early recognition and treatment of childhood blindness has been identified.

One of the causes of visual impairment that is most straightforward to treat is uncorrected refractive error. There appears to have been a global reduction the prevalence of uncorrected refraction error causing poor vision during the project. The smallest reductions were in parts of Africa, and the greatest reductions in Latin America and parts of Asia. The number of people with vision loss due to uncorrected refractive error is expected to rise by 55% by 2050 as a result of population growth and increased average life expectancy.

An important achievement of Vision 2020 was improving awareness of the burden of blindness. Getting prevention of blindness onto the healthcare agenda of the WHO and its member states ensured that those countries included allocations for eye care in their budgets. World Sight Day also helps to raise awareness of blindness and visual impairment.

Between 1990 and 2020, the age-standardised global prevalence of blindness fell by 28.5%. In 2017 The Lancet Global Health Commission reported that avoidable blindness figures were set to triple to 115 million by 2050, but the latest data from the same journal has reduced that forecast to about 60 million This has been attributed in part to the function of the International Agency for the Prevention of Blindness in bringing together a community of active organisations, and providing a platform and voice for collective action. This report was based on data collected before the Covid-19 epidemic, and the effect of the epidemic was not yet known in detail, but was expected to have been a major setback.

=== 2030 In Sight ===
2030 IN SIGHT is a project following on from Vision 2020 associated with the WHO World Report on Vision, the Lancet Global Health Commission on Global Eye Health and the UN Resolution, Vision for Everyone.

The objectives of the program are to eliminate unnecessary and preventable sight loss, to ensure that adequate eye care services are affordably available to everyone, and that everyone understands the necessity of taking care of their eyes. The complexity, scale, and ambition of the challenge are recognised.

A conference to develop strategies for 2030 In Sight was held in Singapore in 2022 and another is scheduled for 2023.

=== Vision Atlas ===
The IAPB Vision Atlas is a website resource providing information on factors affecting vision loss relevant to policy makers, health planners, eye health professionals, NGOs, patient groups and advocates. First published in 2016, and launched at the 10th general assembly in Durban, South Africa in October of that year. The 2020 version provides data, narrative and interactive presentation tools suitable for a broad audience. The atlas is based on national indicators based on the 2014-2019 WHO Global Action Plan, and data and prevalence estimates from the Vision Loss Expert Group.

=== World Sight Day ===
World Sight Day is marked on the second Thursday of every October. Started by the Lions Clubs International Foundation in 1999, it was handed over to IAPB who has been coordinating and supporting the day's marking ever since.

== Publications ==
The IAPB is known for research contributions in topics relating to population and visual impairment. Between 1975 and 2021, 57 authors have produced 85 publications, which have received at least 3286 citations. Papers usually relate to the topics: population, visual impairment, cataract surgery, public health and trachoma.

The IAPB compiles lists of good practices and essential equipment for managing specific conditions in consultation with panels of experts. The first of these was the IAPB Essential Equipment List for screening and surgery for trachomatous trichiasis, which recommends the basic items required for high quality surgery under the conditions expected in endemic regions.

The most widely held publications by the IAPB are:

- Arthur Siew Ming Lim. World's major blinding conditions. 3 editions published in 1982 in English and other languages.
- International Association for the Prevention of Blindness. World blindness and its prevention. 9 editions published between 1980 and 1988 in English.
- Vision (Report). an official publication of the International Agency for the Prevention of Blindness, in English
- World blindness and its prevention. Vol. 1 to 3. in English, several editions published between 1980 and 1986.
- Assemblée générale de l'Association internationale de prophylaxie de la cécité et de l'organisation internationale contre le trachome (in French). Paris. 14 May 1934.
- Vision 2020 : report on world sight (Report).
- State of the world's sight : Vision 2020 : the right to sight, 1999-2005. 2005.
- Strengthening diagnosis and treatment of diabetic retinopathy in South-East Asia Region (Report).
