= Optometrists Association Australia =

Australian professional association

The Optometrists Association Australia (the OAA) is a professional association for Australian optometrists. It is also known as Optometry Australia.

The OAA has state branches that work with members to promote and protect the interests of optometrists and establish standards for the industry.
