= Operation Eyesight Universal =

Blindness organization based in Canada

Operation Eyesight Universal is a Canada-based international development organization working to prevent blindness and restore sight. Founded in 1963 in Calgary, Canada, Operation Eyesight been recognized as a key player working towards the elimination of avoidable blindness. With support from donors, Operation Eyesight collaborates with hospital and government partners in low- and middle-income countries to invest in sustainable eye health treatment, blindness prevention and community development to create a better life for people now and into the future. Operation Eyesight currently has programs in Bangladesh, India, Nepal, Ethiopia, Ghana, Kenya, Liberia and Zambia, and is looking to expand to other countries in the future.

For over a decade, Operation Eyesight has developed and implemented its Hospital-Based Community Eye Health Program model to create access to eye health services at the community level and reach people in remote communities. By recruiting local community health workers and educating communities about eye health and general health, Operation Eyesight encourages health-seeking behaviour among community members. This leads to the elimination of avoidable blindness in entire communities.

Operation Eyesight’s work contributes to the achievement of the United Nations Sustainable Development Goal #3: Good Health and Well-Being, as well as the goals related to poverty, gender equality, water and sanitation, and partnerships.

Operation Eyesight Canada is governed by a volunteer Board of Directors that abides by all laws concerning charitable organizations established by the Government of Canada. In 2017, 2018 and 2019, Operation Eyesight was named a Top 10 Impact Charity by Charity Intelligence Canada.

== Mission ==
Operation Eyesight's mission is to prevent blindness and restore sight. At least 1.1 billion people live with vision loss and 90 percent of vision loss is preventable or treatable. The World Report on Vision recognizes the important contribution of eye health to the Sustainable Development Goals, highlighting the close links between eye health and sustainable development.

== History ==
Operation Eyesight was founded in 1963 when a businessman from Calgary, Canada named Arthur (Art) Jenkyns met Dr. Ben Gullison, a physician who worked at a mission hospital in Sompeta, India. After their meeting, Art was inspired to found Operation Eyesight Universal to raise funds for people needing eye care in India.

In the early 1960s Operation Eyesight began by funding screening camps (mobile diagnostic clinics), cataract surgeries and training aimed at reducing the backlog of cataract surgeries in India. In 1981, Operation Eyesight began to fund prevention programs, such as immunization, improved nutrition, health clinics, skills training and employment that would address the root causes of blindness. These programs improved general health, thereby reducing the incidence of blindness in underserved, marginalized communities.

The emphasis on cataracts had ignored other eye diseases, such as glaucoma, corneal trauma, trachoma and others, which were going undiagnosed and untreated. By the late 1990s, a model of quality, comprehensive, sustainable eye care was developed in India under the LV Prasad Eye Institute (LVPEI) in Hyderabad, India. LVPEI demonstrated that a reputation for quality outcomes attracted paying and non-paying patients. Fees from those who could afford the surgery covered the cost of those who could not. This model, which proved to be successful, also featured rigorous cost control and revenue generation from fees to cover annual operating (non-capital) costs.

Equipped with this knowledge, Operation Eyesight transitioned from a charity or aid model to a development model. As such, Operation Eyesight works collaboratively with each of its medical partners to set objectives and develop a practical plan to achieve quality, comprehensive, sustainable eye care services.

== Activities ==
Operation Eyesight's core services are:

1. Community Empowerment

·

· Eye health education and training

· Public awareness

· Community rehabilitation

2. Quality Eye Care

· Infrastructure

· Diagnostics

· Treatment

3. Health System Strengthening

· Integrated eye health care

· Provision of quality eye health services in a safe care environment

== Partner organizations ==
- The International Agency for the Prevention of Blindness
- L. V. Prasad Eye Institute
