= Optometry =

Field of medicine treating eye disorders

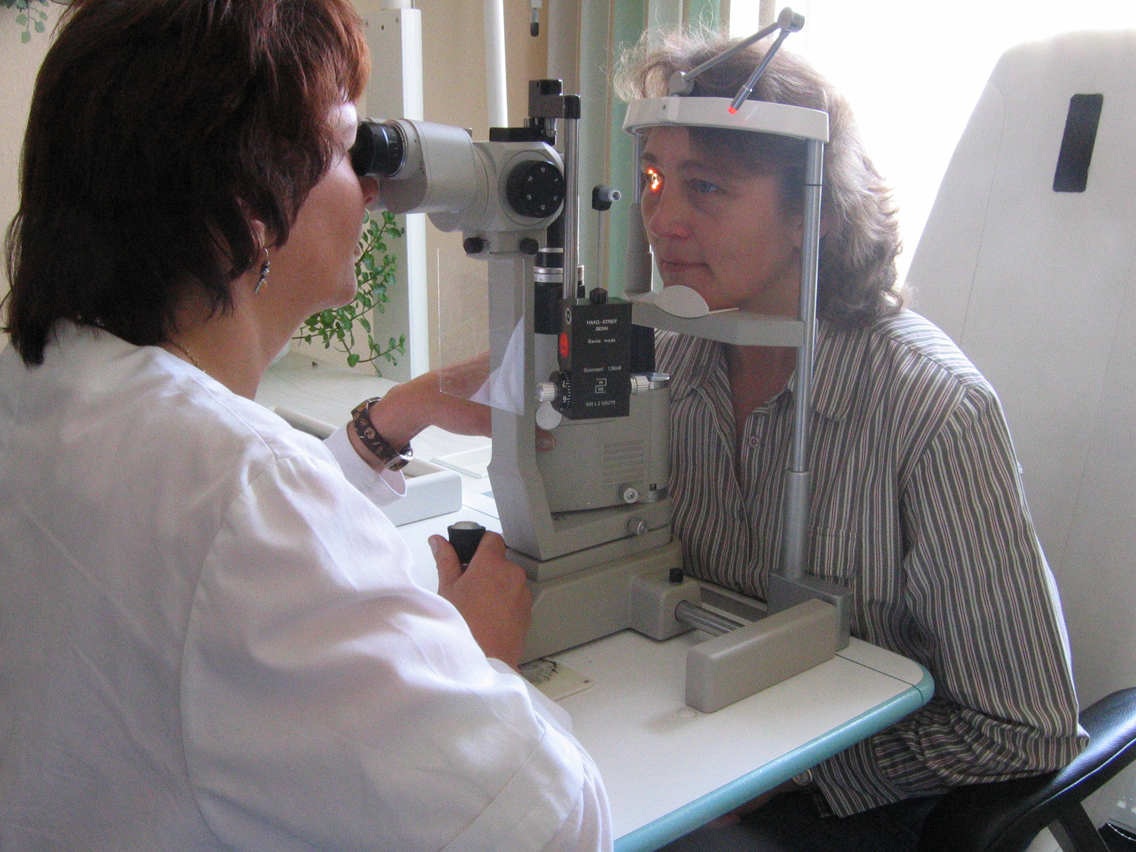
- Eye examination with the aid of a slit lamp
- System: Eye
- Significant diseases: Blurred vision, cataract, macular degeneration, glaucoma, refractive error, retinal disorders, diabetic retinopathy
- Significant tests: Visual field test, ophthalmoscopy

Optometry
Occupation
- Names: Doctor of Optometry, Optometrist
- Occupation type: Health Profession
- Activity sectors: Healthcare

Description
- Competencies: Refractive error, ocular disease, medical therapeutics, binocular vision, sports vision, vision therapy, contact lenses
- Education required: Doctor of Optometry / Master of Optometry / Bachelor of Optometry
- Fields of employment: Hospital, clinic, laboratory

Optometry (from Ancient Greek ὄψις (ópsis), meaning "eye", and μέτρον (métron), meaning "measure") is the healthcare practice concerned with examining the eyes for visual defects, prescribing corrective lenses, and detecting eye abnormalities.

In the United States and Canada, optometrists hold a post-baccalaureate four-year Doctor of Optometry degree. They are trained and licensed to treat some eye-related conditions, in addition to providing refractive (optical) eye care.

In the United Kingdom, optometrists may also provide medical care (e.g., prescribe medications and perform various surgeries) for eye-related conditions in addition to providing refractive care. The Doctor of Optometry degree is rarer in the UK.

Some optometrists participate in academic research for eye-related conditions and diseases. In addition to prescribing glasses and contact lenses for vision-related deficiencies, optometrists are trained in monitoring and treating ocular diseases.

Training for optometrists varies greatly between countries. Some countries only require certificate training while others require a doctoral degree.

== Etymology ==
The term "optometry" comes from the Greek words ὄψις (opsis; "view") and μέτρον (metron; "something used to measure", "measure", "rule"). The word entered the language when the instrument for measuring vision was called an optometer, (before the terms phoropter or refractor were used). The root word opto is a shortened form derived from the Greek word ophthalmos meaning, "eye." Like most healthcare professions, the education and certification of optometrists are regulated in most countries. Optometric professionals and optometry-related organizations interact with governmental agencies, other healthcare professionals, and the community to deliver eye and vision care.

== Definition of optometry and optometrist ==
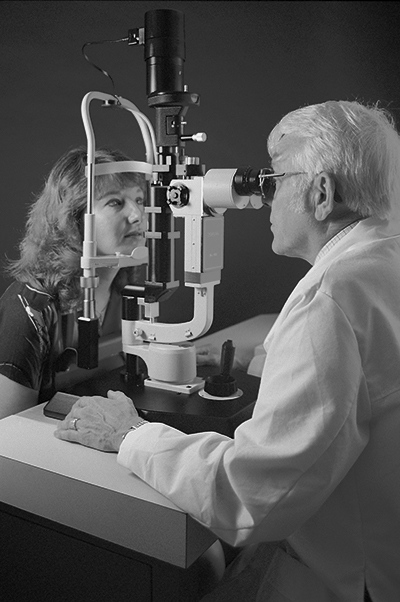
An optometrist examining the eyes of a patient with a slit lamp biomicroscope

The World Council of Optometry, World Health Organization and about 75 optometry organizations from over 40 countries have adopted the following definition, to be used to describe optometry and optometrists.

Optometry is a healthcare profession that is autonomous, educated, and regulated (licensed/registered), and optometrists are the primary healthcare practitioners of the eye and visual system who provide comprehensive eye and vision care, which includes refraction and dispensing, detection/diagnosis and management of disease in the eye, and the rehabilitation of conditions of the visual system.

== History ==
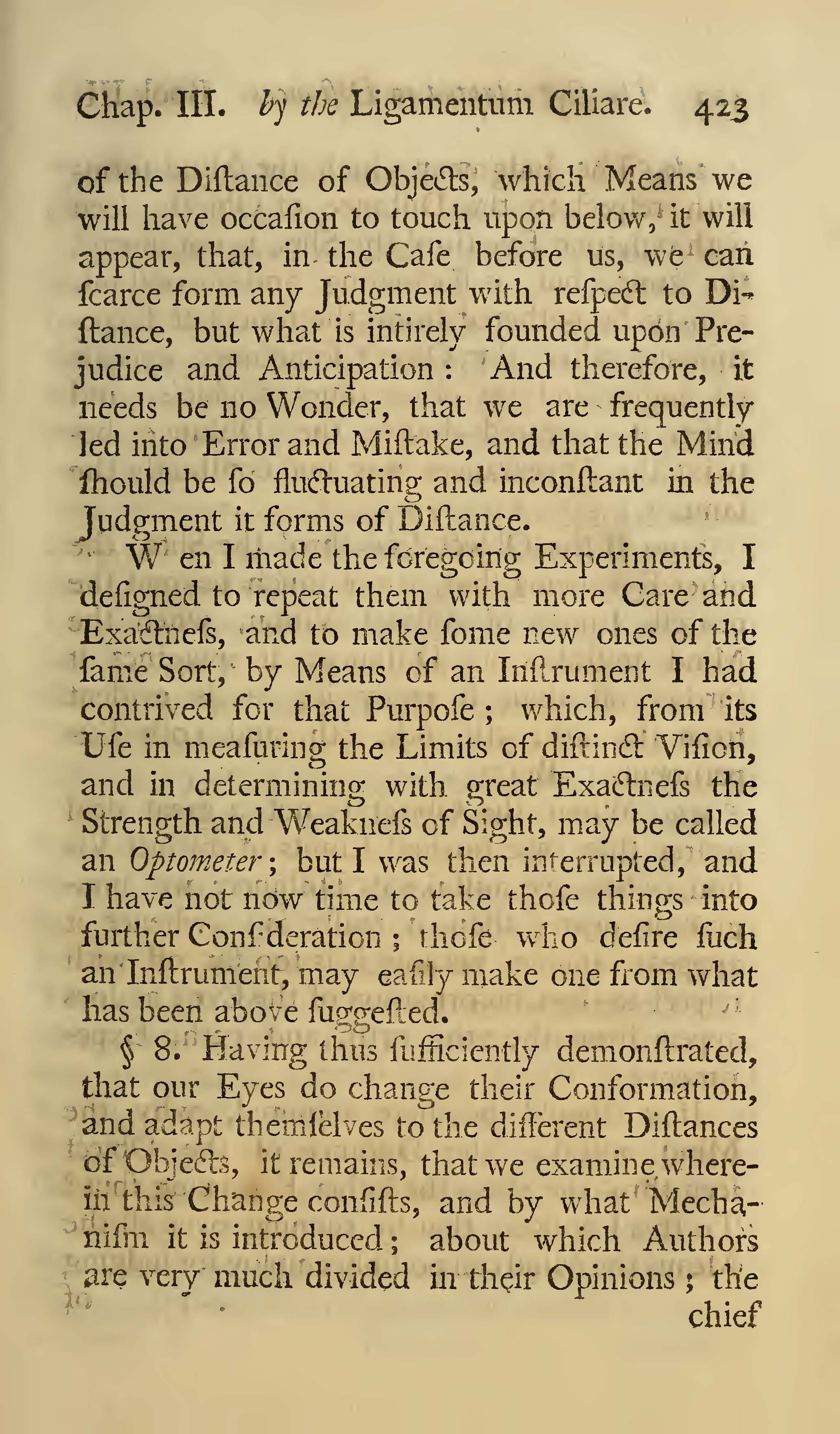
Page 423 from "A treatise on the eye, the manner and phaenomena of vision" by William Porterfield, Published 1759 in Edinburgh. In this book the word "optometer" appears for the first time.

Optometric history is tied to the development of:

- vision science (related areas of medicine, microbiology, neurology, physiology, psychology, etc.)
- optics, optical aids
- optical instruments, imaging techniques
- other eye care professions

The history of optometry can be traced back to thirteenth century, with Roger Bacon's Opus Majus providing a theoretical outline of the use of lenses to improve human vision.

It is unknown when the first spectacles were made. The British scientist and historian Sir Joseph Needham, in his Science and Civilization in China, reported the earliest mention of spectacles was in Venetian guild regulations c. 1300. He suggested that the occasional claim that spectacles were invented in China may have come from a paper by German-American anthropologist Berthold Laufer. According to Needham, the paper by Laufer had many inconsistencies, and the references in the document used by Laufer were not in the original copies but added during the Ming dynasty. Early Chinese sources mention that eyeglasses were imported.

Research by David A. Goss in the United States shows they may have originated in the late 13th century in Italy as stated in a manuscript from 1305 where a monk from Pisa named Rivalto stated "It is not yet 20 years since there was discovered the art of making eyeglasses". Spectacles were manufactured in Italy, Germany, and the Netherlands by 1300. Needham stated spectacles were first made shortly after 1286.

In 1907, Laufer stated in his history of spectacles 'the opinion that spectacles originated in India is of the greatest probability and that spectacles must have been known in India earlier than in Europe'. However, as already mentioned, Joseph Needham showed that the references Laufer cited were not in the older and best versions of the document Laufer used, leaving his claims unsupported.

In Sri Lanka, it is well documented that during the reign of King Bhuvanekabahu IV (AD 1346 – 1353) of the Gampola period the ancient tradition of optical lens making with a natural stone called Diyatarippu was given royal patronage. A few of the craftsmen still live and practice in the original hamlet given to the exponents of the craft by royal decree. But the date of King Bhuvanekabahu is decades after the mention of spectacles in the Venetian guild regulations, and after the 1306 sermon by Dominican friar Giordano da Pisa, where da Pisa said the invention of spectacles was both recent and that he had personally met the inventor.

The German word brille (eyeglasses) is derived from Sanskrit vaidurya. Etymologically, brille is derived from beryl, Latin beryllus, from Greek beryllos, from Prakrit verulia, veluriya, from Sanskrit vaidurya, of Dravidian origin from the city of Velur (modern Belur). Medieval Latin berillus was also applied to eyeglasses, hence German brille, from Middle High German berille, and French besicles (plural) spectacles, altered from old French bericle.

Benito Daza de Valdes published the first full book on opticians in 1623, where he mentioned the use and fitting of eyeglasses. In 1692, William Molyneux wrote a book on optics and lenses where he stated his ideas on myopia and problems related to close-up vision. The scientists Claudius Ptolemy and Johannes Kepler also contributed to the creation of optometry. Kepler discovered how the retina in the eye creates vision. From 1773 until around 1829, Thomas Young discovered the disability of astigmatism and it was George Biddell Airy who designed glasses to correct that problem that included sphero-cylindrical lenses.

Although the term optometer appeared in the 1759 book A Treatise on the Eye: The Manner and Phenomena of Vision by Scottish physician William Porterfield, it was not until the early twentieth century in the United States and Australia that "optometry" began to be used to describe the profession. By the early twenty-first century, however, marking the distinction with dispensing opticians, it had become the internationally accepted term.

== Diseases ==
A partial list of the common diseases optometrists diagnose and manage:

- Amblyopia
- Cataracts
- Corneal disease
- Diabetic retinopathy
- Dry eye syndrome
- Eye neoplasm
- Glaucoma
- Hypertensive retinopathy
- Macular degeneration
- Refractive error (including astigmatism)
- Strabismus
- Uveitis

== Diagnosis ==
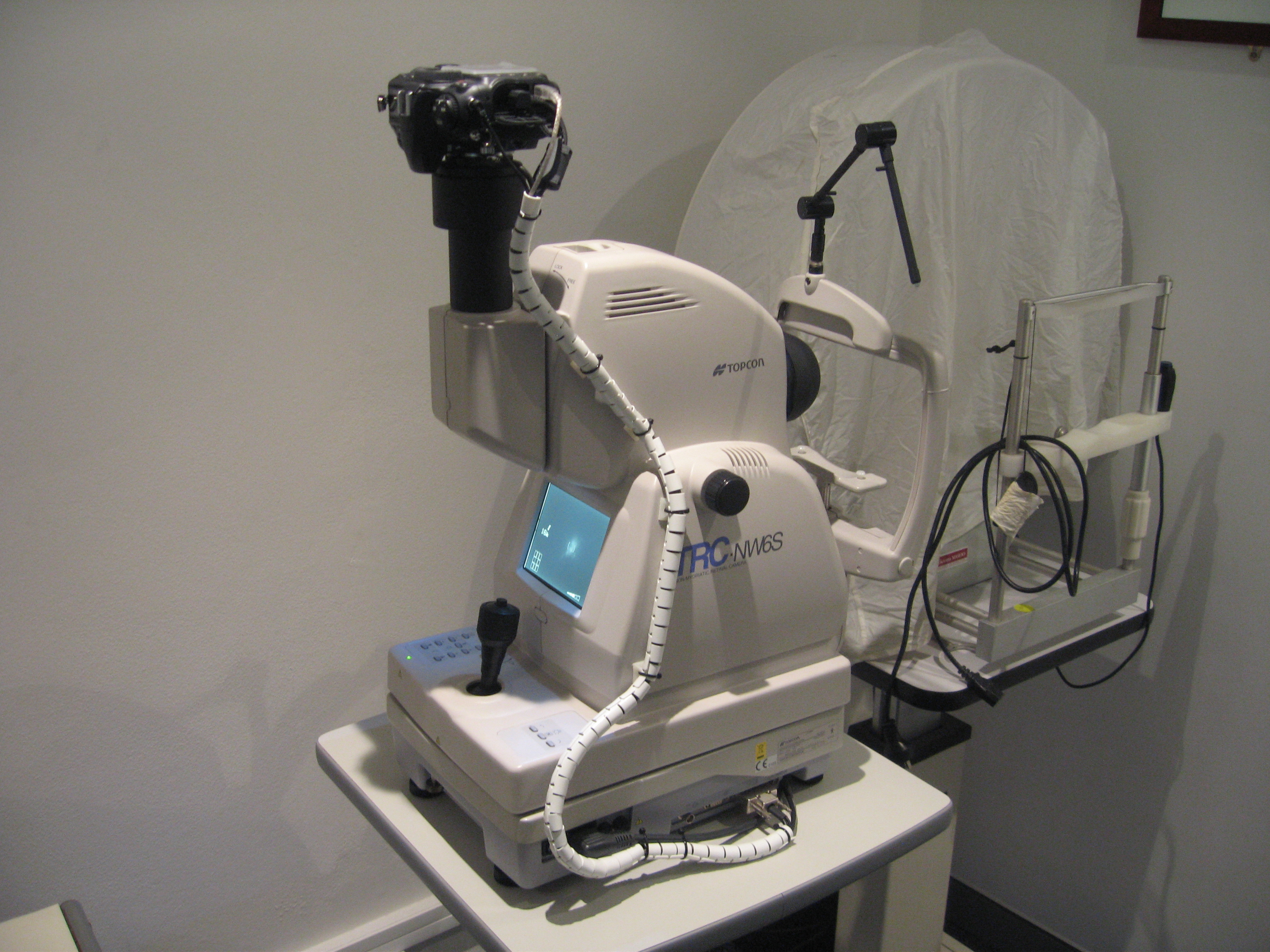
Retinal camera

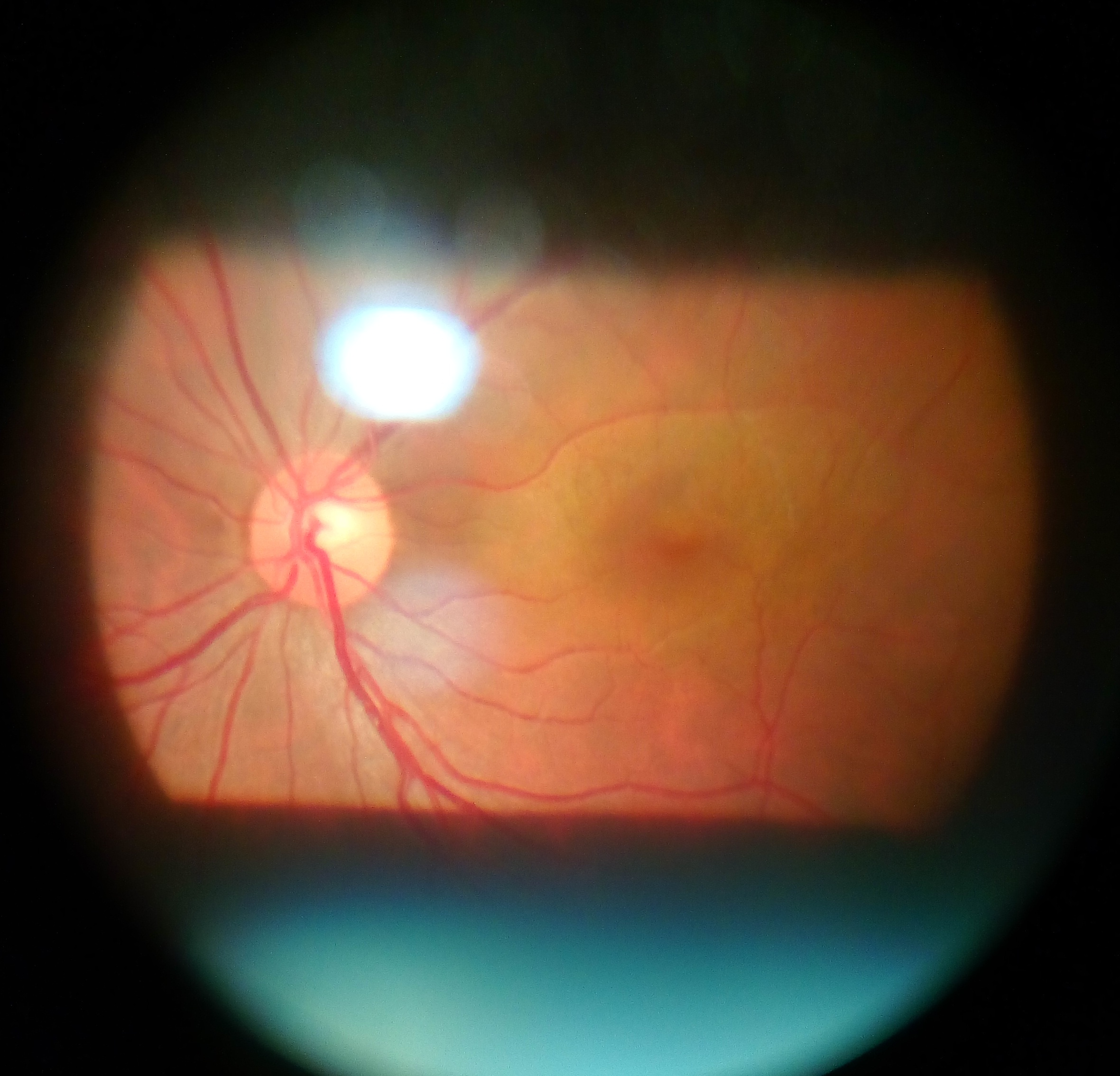
Fundoscopy by using 90 diopter lens with the slit lamp

=== Eye examination ===
Following are examples of examination methods performed during an eye examination that enables diagnosis:

- Ocular tonometry to determine intraocular pressure
- Refraction assessment
- Retina examination
- Slit lamp examination
- Visual acuity
- Color vision test
- Visual field test
- Dry eye test
- Corneal topography

=== Specialized tests ===
Optical coherence tomography (OCT) is a medical technological platform used to assess ocular structures. The information is used by eye doctors to assess staging of pathological processes and confirm clinical diagnoses. Subsequent OCT scans are used to assess the efficacy of treatment for diabetic retinopathy, age-related macular degeneration, and glaucoma.

== Training, licensing, representation and scope of practice ==
Optometry is officially recognized in many jurisdictions. Most have regulations concerning education and practice. Optometrists, like many other healthcare professionals, are required to participate in ongoing continuing education courses to stay current on the latest standards of care.

=== Africa ===
In 1993, five countries in Africa had optometric teaching institutes: Sudan, Ghana, Nigeria, South Africa and Tanzania. Ethiopia began offering optometric education in 2005 at the University of Gondar (UoG). In Kenya, two universities, Masinde Muliro University of Science and Technology (MMUST) and Kaimosi Friends University, offer a Bachelor of Science in Optometry and Vision Sciences.

==== Ghana ====
The Ghana Optometric Association (GOA) regulates the practice of optometry in Ghana. The Kwame Nkrumah University of Science and Technology and the University of Cape Coast are the two universities that offer the degree program in the country. After the six-year training at any of the two universities offering the course, the O.D. degree is awarded. The new optometrist must write a qualifying exam, after which the optometrist is admitted as a member of the GOA, leading to the award of the title MGOA.

==== Mozambique ====
The first optometry course in Mozambique began in 2009 at Universidade Lurio, Nampula. The course is part of the Mozambique Eyecare Project. University of Ulster, Dublin Institute of Technology and Brien Holden Vision Institute are supporting partners. As of 2019, 61 Mozambican students had graduated with optometry degrees from UniLúrio (34 male and 27 female).

==== Nigeria ====
In Nigeria, optometry is regulated by the Optometrists and Dispensing Opticians Registration Board of Nigeria established under the Optometrists and Dispensing Opticians (Registration etc.) Act of 1989 (Cap O9 Laws of Federation of Nigeria 2004). The Board publishes from time to time lists of approved qualifications and training institutions in the federal government gazette.

Optometry education began at the University of Benin in 1970, initially as a four-year bachelor's degree program, making it the first optometry school in West Africa. In 1980, Abia State University introduced the Doctor of Optometry program. The University of Benin upgraded its program to the Doctor of Optometry degree in 1994. Subsequently, Doctor of Optometry programs were established at other public and private universities. The Doctor of Optometry degree is awarded after six years of training at one of the accredited universities located in Edo, Imo, Kano, Kwara, and Abia states.

==== Sudan ====
Sudan's major institution for the training of optometrists is the Faculty of Optometry and Visual Sciences (FOVS), originally established in 1954 as the Institute of Optometry in Khartoum; the Institute joined with the Ministry of Higher Education in 1986 as the High Institute of Optometry, and was annexed into Alneelain University in 1997 when it was renamed the FOVS. The FOVS offers several programs: a BSc in Optometry, which takes five years and includes sub-specialization in orthoptics, contact lenses, ocular photography, or ocular neurology; a BSc in Ophthalmic Technology, requiring four years of training; and a BSc in Optical Dispensary, completed in four years. The FOVS also offers MSc and PhD degrees in optometry. The FOVS is the only institute of its kind in Sudan and was the first institution of higher education in optometry in the Middle East and Africa. In 2010, Alneelain University Eye Hospital was established as part of the FOVS to expand training capacity and to serve the broader Sudanese community. The Sudanese Optometry Society (SOS) is a national professional organization dedicated to advancing optometry and primary eye care in Sudan. It promotes professional education, research, clinical development, eye-health awareness, and collaboration among eye-care professionals and institutions.

=== Asia ===
==== Bangladesh ====
Optometry was first introduced in Bangladesh in 2010 at the Institute of Community Ophthalmology under the Faculty of Medicine, University of Chittagong. This institute offers a four-year Bachelor of Science in Optometry (B.Optom) course. As of 2017, there are 200 graduate optometrists in Bangladesh. The association that controls the quality of optometry practice across the country is the Optometrists Association of Bangladesh, which is also a country member of the World Council of Optometry (WCO).

In 2018, Chittagong Medical University was established, and the BSc in Optometry course was transferred to this university.

In Bangladesh, optometrists perform primary eye care like diagnosis and primary management of some ocular diseases, prescribe eye glasses, low vision rehabilitation, provide vision therapy, contact lens practice and all type of orthoptic evaluations and therapies.

Registration of optometrists by the Ministry of Health remained pending.

==== China ====
In the People's Republic of China, optometric education began in 1988 at the Wenzhou Medical University. Since that time, the discipline and the profession have emerged as a five-year, medically based program within the medical education system of China. Students in the program receive the highest level of training in optometry and are provided with the credentials needed to assume positions of leadership in China's medical education and health care systems. In 2000, the Ministry of Health formally accepted optometry as a subspecialty of medicine.

==== Hong Kong ====
The Optometrists Board of the Supplementary Medical Professions Council regulates the profession in Hong Kong. Optometrists are listed in separate parts of the register based on their training and ability. Registrants are subject to restrictions depending on the part they are listed in. Those who pass the examination on refraction conducted by the Board may be registered to Part III, thereby restricted to practice only work related to refraction. Those who have a Higher Certificate in Optometry or have passed the board's optometry examination may be registered to Part II, thereby restricted in their use of diagnostic agents, but may otherwise practice freely. Part I optometrists may practice without restrictions and generally hold a bachelor's degree or a professional diploma.

There are around 2000 optometrists registered in Hong Kong, 1000 of which are Part I. There is one Part I optometrist to about 8000 members of the public. The Polytechnic University runs the only optometry school. It produces around 35 Part I optometrists each year.

=== India ===
In 2010, it was estimated that India needed 115,000 optometrists. In contrast, India has approximately 15,000 optometrists Bachelor of Optometry (four-year trained as per University Grant Commission Notification 5 July 2014) and 50,000 Diploma in Optometry (two-year trained diploma conferred By State Medical Faculty). In order to prevent blindness or visual impairment more well-trained optometrists are required in India. The definition of optometry differs considerably in different countries. India needs more optometry schools offering four-year degree courses with a syllabus similar to that in force in those countries where the practice of optometry is statutorily regulated and well established with an internationally accepted definition.

In 2013, it was reported in the Indian Journal of Ophthalmology that poor spectacle compliance amongst school children in rural Pune resulted in significant vision loss.

In 2015, it was reported that optometrists need to be more involved in providing core optometry services like binocular vision and low vision.

==== History of optometry education in india ====
Optometry education in India began during British rule in 1927, the first college was established in West Bengal with the name The Indian College of Optics and the certification was diploma in optometry.

After the independence of India, the Directorate General Of Health Services (DGHS) Government of India in 1958, introduced the first (by the Central Government of india) optometry education in the form of a diploma in optometry with the collaboration of UP State Medical Faculty, Government Of Utter Pradesh, under the second five-year plan. The government offered diplomas in optometry courses of two years duration conferred by State Medical Faculties, empowered under the Indian Medical Degree Act, 1916 (as per Government of India Notification Department of Education, Health and Lands No,1964 dated 16 December 1926, effective from 15 November 1929). The first two schools of optometry were established at Gandhi Eye Hospital, Aligarh in Uttar Pradesh, (the first school of optometry started by Mohan Lal) and at Sarojini Devi Eye Hospital, Hyderabad in Telangana.

Subsequently, four more schools were opened across India, situated at Sitapur Eye Hospital, Sitapur in Uttar Pradesh; Chennai (formerly Madras) in Tamil Nadu; Bengalooru (formerly Bangalore) in Karnataka; and the Regional Institute of Ophthalmology, Thiruvananthapuram (formerly Trivandrum) in Kerala.

In 1985, the Elite School of Optometry (ESO) was established in Chennai (The first school of optometry/college started by S. Badrinath) and was the first to offer a four-year degree course Baccalaureate of Science in Optometry (B.S. Optometry). The degree was conferred only by the Shanker Netraliya (Elite School of Optometry and the first principal was E. Vaithilingam) instead of any university or state government authority, etc. After that, the B.S. in Optometry (under off-campus mode) was affiliated with Bitis Pilani University, Rajasthan, and re-affiliated with the University of State of Tamilnadu, India.

The School of Optometry at Bharati Vidyapeeth Deemed University, Pune, established in 1998, was the first to offer a four-year degree course and confer a Bachelor of Clinical Optometry. The university also provided a pathway for diploma holders to upgrade their education to a Degree of Optometry through a lateral entry program. Also, the first two years of the Master of Optometry course were introduced in 2003.

The All India Institute of Medical Science(AIIMS), New Delhi introduced a two-year Diploma in Clinical Technology-Optometry (D.C.T. in Optometry) in 1973 and then upgraded the diploma course to a three-year B.Sc. (H) in Ophthalmic Technique in 1975. After that, the nomenclature to degree and course of duration changed from B.Sc. (H) to Bachelor of Optometry, with a four-year duration following the University Grants Commission (UGC) notification in 2014. The first batch of students graduated in 2019.

There are more than fifty schools of optometry and colleges in India, and over 100 universities confer Bachelor of Optometry (B.Optom) and Master of Optometry (M.Optom) professional degrees. Additionally, Doctor of Philosophy degrees in optometry are awarded by universities recognized by the University Grants Commission (UGC), a statutory body responsible for maintaining standards of higher education in India.

Optometrists across India are encouraged to register under the National Commission for Allied and Healthcare Professions Act, 2021, which was enacted by the Parliament of India in 2021. The Delhi Optometrists Association (DOA) has endorsed all updates related to optometry education in India.

==== Malaysia ====
It takes four years to complete a degree in optometry. As of 2022, optometry courses have been well received by citizens, with nearly 3,000 registered optometrists. More universities and higher education studies are about to implement the courses, such as the National Institute of Ophthalmic Sciences in Petaling Jaya. Other public universities that offer this course include University Kebangsaan Malaysia (UKM), Universiti Teknologi Mara (UiTM), and International Islamic University Malaysia (IIUM). There are also private universities that offer this course such as Management and Science University (MSU) and SeGi University. After completing the degree in optometry, optometrists who practice in Malaysia must register with the Malaysian Optical Council (MOC), which is an organization under the Ministry of Health.

The Association of Malaysian Optometrists is the only body that represents the Malaysian optometrist profession. All of the members are either local or overseas graduates in the field of optometry.

==== Pakistan ====
Optometry is offered as a four- or five-year programme leading to a bachelor's, bachelor's with honors, or doctoral degree at several institutions including the Department of Optometry & Vision Sciences (DOVS) FAHS, ICBS, Lahore, Pakistan Institute of Community Ophthalmology (PICO) Peshawar, Pakistan Institute of Rehabilitation Science Isra University campus Islamabad (PIRS), College of Ophthalmology & Allied Vision Sciences (COAVS) Lahore and Al-Shifa Institute of Ophthalmology Islamabad. After graduation, the optometrists can work within a four-tiered service delivery level (Centre of Excellence, Tertiary/Teaching, District headquarter and sub-district /Tehsil headquarters). An M.Phil. in Optometry is also available at select institutions such as King Edward Medical University, Lahore. The Department of Optometry & Vision Sciences (DOVS) FAHS, ICBS, Lahore started bridging programmes for bachelor's and bachelor's with honors degrees leading to the Doctor of Optometry (OD), Post-Professional Doctor of Optometry (PP-OD), and Transitional Doctor of Optometry (T-OD) qualifications. Optometry is not yet a regulated field in Pakistan as there is no professional licensing board or authority responsible for issuing practise licenses to qualified optometrists. This has created difficulties for Pakistani optometrists who wish to register abroad. The University of Lahore and Imam Hussain Medical University have also launched Doctor of Optometry (OD) programs. The chairman of Imam Hussain Medical University, Dr Sabir Hussain Babachan (OD), vowed to regulate the OD curriculum according to international standards.

==== Philippines ====
Optometry is regulated by the Professional Regulation Commission of the Philippines. To be eligible for licensing, each candidate must have satisfactorily completed a Doctor of Optometry course at an accredited institution and demonstrate good moral character with no previous record of professional misconduct. Professional organizations of optometry in the Philippines include Optometric Association of the Philippines and Integrated Philippine Association of Optometrists, Inc. (IPAO).

==== Saudi Arabia ====
In Saudi Arabia, optometrists must complete a five-year doctor of optometry degree from Qassim University and King Saud University. Also, they must complete a one-year residency.

==== Singapore ====
Tertiary education for optometrists consists of a three-year diploma in optometry offered at institutions such as Singapore Polytechnic and Ngee Ann Polytechnic

==== Taiwan ====
Optometry education in Taiwan began in 1982 at Shu-Zen College of Medicine and Management. Bachelor's degrees in optometry can be obtained from seven universities (North to South): University of Kang Ning, Yuanpei University of Medical Technology, Asia University, Central Taiwan University of Science and Technology, Chung Shan Medical University, Dayeh University, and Chung Hwa University of Medical Technology; whereas associate degrees in optometry can be obtained from Mackay Junior College of Medicine, Nursing and Management, Hsin Sheng College of Medical Care and Management, Jen-Teh Junior College of Medicine, Nursing, and Management, and Shu-Zen College of Medicine and Management.

The Law of Optometrists was established in Taiwan in 2015; since then, optometry students after obtaining optometry degrees, need to pass the National Optometry Examination of Taiwan to be registered as optometrists. There are approximately 4,000 optometrists in Taiwan as of 2020, and around 400 optometrists register annunally (2018-2020).

==== Thailand ====
Since late 1990, Thailand has set a goal to provide more than 600 optometrists to meet the minimal public demands and international standards in vision care. There are more than three university degree programs in Thailand. Each program accepts students who have completed Grade 12 or the third year in high school (following US education model). These programs offer the Doctor of Optometry degree, which takes six years to complete. Practising optometrists will also be required to pass licensing examination (three parts examinations) that is administrated through a committee under the Ministry of Public Health.

As of 2015, the number of practicing optometrists in Thailand is still fewer than one hundred. However, it has projected that the number of practising optometrists in Thailand will greatly increase within the next ten years. In the theoretical scenario, the number of optometrists should be able to meet minimal public demands around 2030 or earlier.

=== Europe ===
Since the formation of the European Union, the Association of European Schools and Colleges of Optometry (AESCO) has led efforts to unify the profession through the introduction of a Europe-wide examination for optometry. The first examinations of the European Diploma in Optometry were held in 1998 and this was a landmark event for optometry in continental Europe.

==== France ====
As of July 2003, there was no regulatory framework and optometrists were sometimes trained by completing an apprenticeship at an ophthalmologists' private office.

==== Germany ====
Optometric tasks are performed by ophthalmologists and professionally trained and certified opticians.

==== Greece ====
Hellenic Ministry of Education founded the first department of Optometry at Technological Educational Institute of Patras in 2007. After protests from the Department of Optics at Technological Educational Institute of Athens (the only department of optics in Greece, until 2006), the government changed the names of the departments to Optics and Optometry and included lessons in both optics and optometry. Optometrists-Opticians have to complete a four-year undergraduate honors degree. Then the graduates can be admitted to postgraduate courses in optometry at universities around the world.

Since 2015, a Master of Science (MSc) course in optometry is offered by the Technological Educational Institute of Athens.

The Institute of Vision and Optics (IVO) of the University of Crete focuses on the sciences of vision and is active in the fields of research, training, technology development and provision of medical services. Ioannis Pallikaris has received numerous awards and recognitions for the institute's contribution to ophthalmology. In 1989, he performed the first LASIK procedure on a human eye.

==== Hungary ====
Optometry education in Hungary is a four year program offered at medical universities, leading to a Bachelor of Science degree. They work in networks of retail optical stores and private clinics, while very few are employed in the healthcare system as ophthalmologists' assistants.

==== Ireland ====
The profession of optometry has been represented for over a century by the Association of Optometrists, Ireland (AOI). In Ireland an optometrist must first complete a four-year degree in optometry at Dublin Institute of Technology. Following successful completion of the degree, an optometrist must then complete professional qualifying examinations to enter the register of the Opticians Board (Bord na Radharcmhaistoiri). Optometrists must be registered with the Board to practice in the Republic of Ireland.

The AOI provides continuing education and professional development programs for optometrists in Ireland. The legislation governing the profession was enacted in 1956. According to the AOI, aspects of the legislation limited the scope of optometric practice by restricting the use of certain skills, equipment, and procedures. A 2003 amendment to the Act removed one of the most significant restrictions by permitting the use of cycloplegic drugs to examine children.

==== Italy ====
The practice of optometry in Italy began in the early 20th century, while the historical practice of opticians date back to the 13th century. Optometry was traditionally taught as an advanced study for opticians, and later as a tertiary education, including at some private institutions such as Irsoo Vinci Institute near Firenze o IBZ Institute in Bologna and Milan. After 2001, nine universities (Milan, Padua, Turin, Salento, Florence, Naples, Rome, Perugia and Palermo) began similar three-year graduate courses (EQF level 6, equivalent to a BSc degree) of scienze e tecnologie fisiche (that is, "physical sciences and technologies") within their physics departments. The degrees awarded in optics and optometry are classified in the family of physics degree, and do not allow recipients to practise optometry, per se; an external licence exam to become an ophthalmic optician is necessary to practise. Although optometry itself remains unregulated in Italy, a state business classification exists for optometric practice. Approximately one-third of licensed ophthalmic opticians also practise optometry. In practice, every optometrist is also licensed as an ophthalmic optician, and a minority of opticians have optometry education and practise it extensively. In Italy, opticians may independently perform refractions for patients with myopia and presbyopia, without age restrictions. Opticians are part of the National Health System, while the profession of dispensing optician has never been regulated and is not recognized as a healthcare profession. Over the past thirty years, several High Court rulings have affirmed that optometry is an independent practice and has specific education path; its role is clearly different from those of ophthalmologists, orthoptists, and opticians. The Italian National Institute of Statistics (Istat) classifies two professional roles under occupational category 3.2.1.6.1, Ottici e ottici optometristi.

==== Norway ====
In Norway, the optometric profession has been regulated as a healthcare profession since 1988. After a three-year bachelor program, one can practice basic optometry. At least one year in clinical practice qualify for a post-degree half-year sandwich course in contact lens fitting, which is regulated as a healthcare speciality. A separate regulation for the use of diagnostic drugs in optometric practice was introduced in 2004.

==== Russia ====
In Russia, optometry education has been accredited by the Federal Agency of Health and Social Development. There are only two educational institutions that teach optometry in Russia: Saint Petersburg Medical Technical College, formerly known as St. Petersburg College of Medical Electronics and Optics, and The Helmholtz Research Institute for Eye Diseases. They both belong and are regulated by the Ministry of Health. The optometry program is a four-year program. It includes one to two science foundation years, one year focused on clinical and proficiency skills, and one year of clinical rotations in hospitals. Graduates take college/state examinations and then receive a specialist diploma. This diploma is valid for only five years and must be renewed every five years after receiving additional training at state-accredited programs.

The scope of practice for optometrists in Russia includes refraction, contact lens fitting, spectacles construction and lens fitting (dispensing), low vision aids, foreign body removal, referrals to other specialists after clinical condition diagnoses (management of diseases in the eye).

==== United Kingdom ====
===== Licensing =====
Optometrists in the United Kingdom are regulated by the General Optical Council under the Opticians Act 1989 and distinguished from medical practitioners. Registration with the GOC is mandatory to practice optometry in the UK. Members of the College of Optometrists (incorporated by a Royal Charter granted by Her Majesty Queen Elizabeth II) may use the suffix MCOptom.

The National Health Service provides free sight tests and spectacle vouchers for children and those on very low incomes. The elderly and those with some chronic conditions like diabetes get free periodic tests. Treatment for eye conditions such as glaucoma and cataracts is free and checked for during normal eye examinations.

===== Training =====
In the United Kingdom, optometrists have to complete a four-year undergraduate honors degree followed by a minimum of a one-year internship, pre-registration period, during which they complete clinical practice under the supervision of a qualified and experienced practitioner. During this year the pre-registration candidate is given a number of quarterly assessments, often including temporary posting at a hospital, and on successfully passing all of these assessments, a final one-day set of examinations (details correct for candidates from 2006). Following successful completion of these assessments and having completed one year's supervised practice, the candidate is eligible to register as an optometrist with the General Optical Council (GOC) and, should they so wish, are entitled to membership of the College of Optometrists. Twelve universities offer Optometry in the UK: Anglia Ruskin, Aston, Bradford, Cardiff, City, Glasgow Caledonian, Hertfordshire, Manchester, Plymouth, Portsmouth, Ulster at Coleraine and West of England.

In 2008 the UK moved forward to offer the Doctor of Optometry postgraduate program. This became available at the Institute of Optometry in London in partnership with London South Bank University. The Doctor of Optometry postgraduate degree is also offered at one other UK institution: Aston University.

===== Scope of practice =====
In 1990, a survey of the opinions of British medical practitioners regarding the services provided by British optometrists was carried out by Agarwal at City, University of London. A majority of respondents were in favour of optometrists extending their professional role by treating external eye conditions and prescribing broad-spectrum topical antibiotics through additional training and certification.

Since 2009, optometrists in the UK have been able to undertake additional postgraduate training and qualifications that allow them to prescribe medications to treat and manage eye conditions. There are three registerable specialities:

- Additional supply speciality – to write orders for, and supply in an emergency, a range of drugs in addition to those ordered or supplied by a normal optometrist.
- Supplementary prescribing speciality – to manage a patient's clinical condition and prescribe medicines according to a clinical management plan set up in conjunction with an independent prescriber, such as a GP or ophthalmologist or qualified optometrist.
- Independent prescribing specialty – to take responsibility for the clinical assessment of a patient, establish a diagnosis and determine the clinical management required, including prescribing where necessary.

Optometrists in the United Kingdom are able to diagnose and manage most ocular diseases, and may also undertake further training to perform certain surgical procedures.

=== North America ===
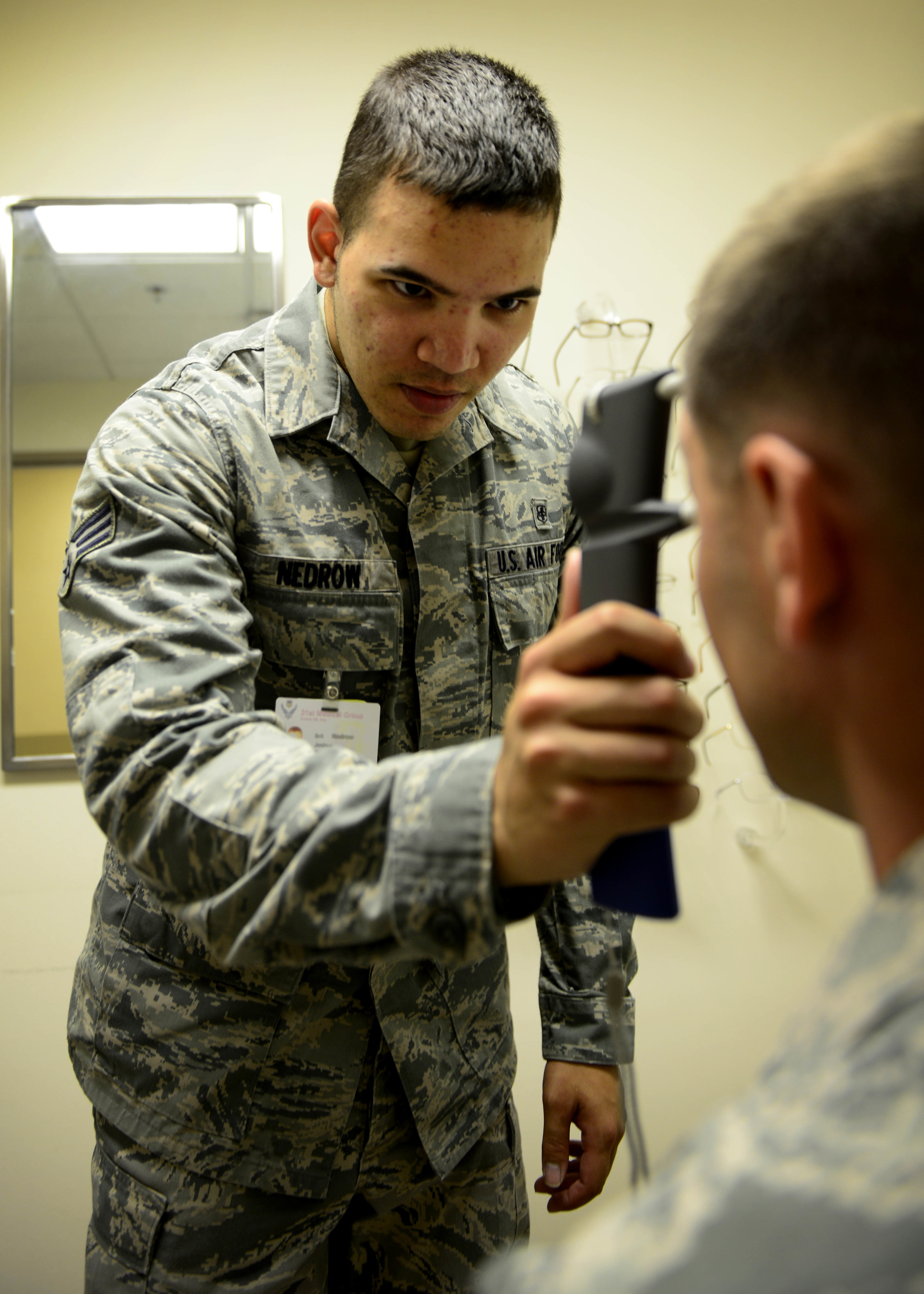
A technician at Aviano Air Base Optometry Clinic measures the intraocular pressure of a patient with a handheld tonometer, July 7, 2015.

==== Canada ====
===== Training =====
In Canada, doctors of optometry typically complete four years of undergraduate studies followed by four to five years of optometry studies, accredited by the Accreditation Council on Optometric Education. There are two such schools of optometry located in Canada — the University of Waterloo and the Université de Montreal. Canada also recognizes degrees from the twenty US schools.

===== Licensing =====
In Canada, doctors of optometry must write national written and practical board exams. Additionally, optometrists are required to become licensed in the province in which they wish to practice. Regulation of professions is within provincial jurisdiction. Therefore, regulation of optometry is unique to individual provinces and territories. In Ontario, optometrists are licensed by the College of Optometrists of Ontario.

===== Representation =====
In Canada, the profession is represented by the Canadian Association of Optometrists. In the province of Ontario, the Ontario Association of Optometrists is the designated representative of optometrists to the provincial government.

===== Scope of practice =====
Optometrists in Canada are trained and licensed to be primary eye care providers. They provide optical and medical eye care. They are able to diagnose and treat most eye diseases and can prescribe both topical and oral medications. They can also undertake further qualifications in order to perform some surgical procedures.

==== United States ====
Optometrists, doctors of optometry, or optometric physicians are primary eye care providers. They provide comprehensive optical and medical eye care. They are trained and licensed to practice medicine for eye related conditions - prescribe topical medications (prescription eye drops), oral medications as well as administer diagnostic agents. In some states, optometrists may also be licensed to perform certain types of eye surgery.

===== Scope of practice =====
Optometrists provide optical and medical eye care. They prescribe corrective lenses to aid refractive errors (e.g. myopia, hyperopia, presbyopia, astigmatism, double vision). They manage vision development in children including amblyopia diagnosis/treatment. Some perform vision therapy. They are trained to diagnose and manage any eye disease and their associations with systemic health. Optometrists are trained and licensed to practice medicine for eye-related conditions (including bacterial/viral infections, inflammation, glaucoma, macular degeneration, and diabetic retinopathy). They can prescribe all topical medications (eye drops) and most oral medications (taken by mouth), including scheduled controlled substances. They may also remove ocular foreign bodies and order blood panels or imaging studies such as CT or MRI. Optometrists do not perform invasive surgery. However, in some states, optometrists may perform superficial surgeries within the anterior segment of the eye including removal of certain eyelid lesions. As of 2025, 14 states allow certified optometrists to perform certain laser procedures.

The Centers for Medicare & Medicaid Services has defined optometrists as physicians and allow them to bill medical insurance plans accordingly.

Optometrists in the United States are regulated by state boards, which vary from state to state.

The Association of Regulatory Boards of Optometry (ARBO) assists these state board licensing agencies in regulating the practice of optometry.

===== Licensing =====
Optometrists must complete all coursework and graduate from an accredited college of optometry. They must also pass all parts of the national board examinations as well as local jurisprudence examinations, which vary by state.

===== Education and training =====
Optometrists typically complete four years of undergraduate studies followed by four years of optometry school. Some complete a fifth year of training. Their program is highly specific to the eyes and related structures. Optometrists receive their medical eye training while enrolled in optometry school and during internships. Training may take place in colleges of optometry, hospitals, clinics and private practices. In many instances optometry students and ophthalmology residents will co-manage medical cases. Instructors may be optometrists, professors or physicians. The program includes extensive classroom and clinical training in geometric, physical, physiological and ophthalmic optics, specialty contact lens evaluation, general anatomy, ocular anatomy, ocular disease, pharmacology, ocular pharmacology, neuroanatomy and neurophysiology of the visual system, pediatric visual development, gerontology, binocular vision, color vision, form, space, movement and vision perception, systemic disease, histology, microbiology, sensory and perceptual psychology, biochemistry, statistics and epidemiology.

Optometrists are required to obtain continuing education credit hours to maintain licensure - number of hours varies by state.

Optometrists prescribing schedule controlled substances are required to renew their DEA license every few years.

=== Oceania ===
==== Australia ====
Australia has six recognized courses in optometry, and one course seeking to obtain accreditation with the Optometry Council of Australia and New Zealand:

- Bachelor of Vision Science and Master of Optometry (BVisSci MOptom), Deakin University
- Bachelor of Medical Science (Vision Science) and Master of Optometry, Flinders University
- Bachelor of Vision Science and Master of Clinical Optometry (BVisSc MClinOptom), University of New South Wales
- Bachelor of Vision Science and Master of Optometry, Queensland University of Technology
- Bachelor of Vision Science and Master of Optometry, University of Canberra
- Doctor of Optometry, Melbourne University (post-graduate)
- Doctor of Optometry, University of Western Australia (post-graduate)

To support these courses the Australian College of Optometry provides clinical placements to undergraduate students from Australian universities and abroad.

in 2016, almost 5000 optometrists in general practice were licensed with their regulatory body, the Optometry Board of Australia. Of these, approximately 2300 were registered with the scheduled medicines endorsement, which enables them to prescribe some medicines for the treatment of conditions of the eye. The Optometrists Association of Australia works to protect the interests of optometrists in Australia.

==== New Zealand ====
New Zealand has one recognized course in optometry:

- Bachelor of Optometry (BOptom), The University of Auckland

In July 2014, the Medicines Amendment Act 2013 and Misuse of Drugs Amendment Regulations 2014 came into effect. Among other changes, the legislation recorgnized optometrists as authorised prescribers. This enabled optometrists with a therapeutic pharmaceutical agent (TPA) endorsement to prescribe all medicines appropriate to their scope of practice, rather than limiting them to a list of medicines specified in the regulation. The amendment recognized the safe and appropriate prescribing practice of optometrists over the previous nine years.

=== South America ===
==== Brazil ====
The CBOO (Brazilian Council of Optics and Optometry), which is affiliated to the WCO (World Council of Optometry), represents Brazilian optometrists. In conjunction with organizations representing the optical industry, including the National Commerce Confederation for Goods, Services and Tourism (CNC) through CBÓptica/CNC, it advocates for the independent practice of optometry in Brazil.

The Federal Supreme Court (STF), the Brazilian Court of Justice and the Superior Court of Justice (STJ), and other national courts have issued rulings in favor of ophthalmologists.

In Brazilian law, however, there is an explicit recommendation that the one prescribing corrective lenses are prohibited to sell them. Since 1930, this restriction has required optical shops to remain separate from hospitals and eye clinics. Some professional organiszations have called for the legislation to be reviewed before further regulation of optometry is introduced.

==== Colombia ====
In Colombia, optometry education is accredited by the Ministry of Health. The last official revision to the laws regarding healthcare standards in the country was issued in 1992 through the Law 30. Eight universities are authorized by the Institute for the Evaluation of Education (ICFES) to award optometry qualifications. The first optometrists arrived in the country from North America and Europe around 1914. These professionals specialized in optics and refraction. In 1933, under Decrees 449 and 1291, the Colombian government established the legal framework for professional education and practice in the field of optometry. In 1966, La Salle University established its Faculty of Optometry following recommendations from a group of professionals. Optometrists are encouraged to keep up with emerging technologies through conferences and scholarships granted by the government and private organizations such as Bausch & Lomb.

== See also ==
- American Academy of Optometry
- Behavioral optometry
- Eye care professional
- Eyeglass prescription
- Least distance of distinct vision
- Ophthalmology
- Visual neuroscience
- World Council of Optometry

== Sources ==
- http://www.oregonoptometry.org
- http://oaop.org/oaop
- http://idaho.aoa.org
- https://web.archive.org/web/20131021065719/http://washington.aoa.org/
- http://www.njsop.org/aws/NJSOP/pt/sp/home_page
- http://www.ijo.in/article.asp?issn=0301-4738;year=2012;volume=60;issue=5;spage=401;epage=405;aulast=De
- https://www2.aston.ac.uk/study/courses/doctor-of-optometry
- https://ispyjobs.com/optometry/
