= World Sight Day =

Global event to draw attention to vision problems

- Official name: World Sight Day
- Also called: WSD
- Type: International
- Observances: Focus global attention on blindness and vision impairment
- Date: Second Thursday of October every year
- First time: 12 October 2000; 24 years ago

World Sight Day, observed annually on the second Thursday of October, is a global event meant to draw attention to blindness and vision impairment. It was originally initiated by the SightFirstCampaign of Lions Club International Foundation in 2000.

It has since been integrated into VISION 2020 and is coordinated by the International Agency for the Prevention of Blindness (IAPB) in cooperation with the World Health Organization.

The theme for World Sight Day 2014—held on October 9, 2014—was "No more Avoidable Blindness".

It took place on the second Thursday in October 2014.

== World Sight Day, 2000–present ==
The following table shows the themes (or "calls to action") of each World Sight Day since 2000.

Year	Theme
2000	no theme
2001	no theme
2002	no theme
2003	no theme
2004	no theme
2005	The Right to Sight
2006	Low Vision
2007	Vision for Children
2008	Fighting Vision Impairment in Later Life
2009	Gender and Eye Health
2010	Countdown to 2020
2011	no theme
2012	no theme
2013	Universal Eye Health
2014	No more Avoidable Blindness
2015	Eye care for all
2016	Stronger Together
2017	Make Vision Count
2018	Eye Care Everywhere
2019	Vision First
2020	Hope In Sight
2021	Love Your Eyes
2023	Eye Care in the Workplace
2024	Children, Love Your Eyes
2025	Love Your Eyes
