= Optometry in Ghana =

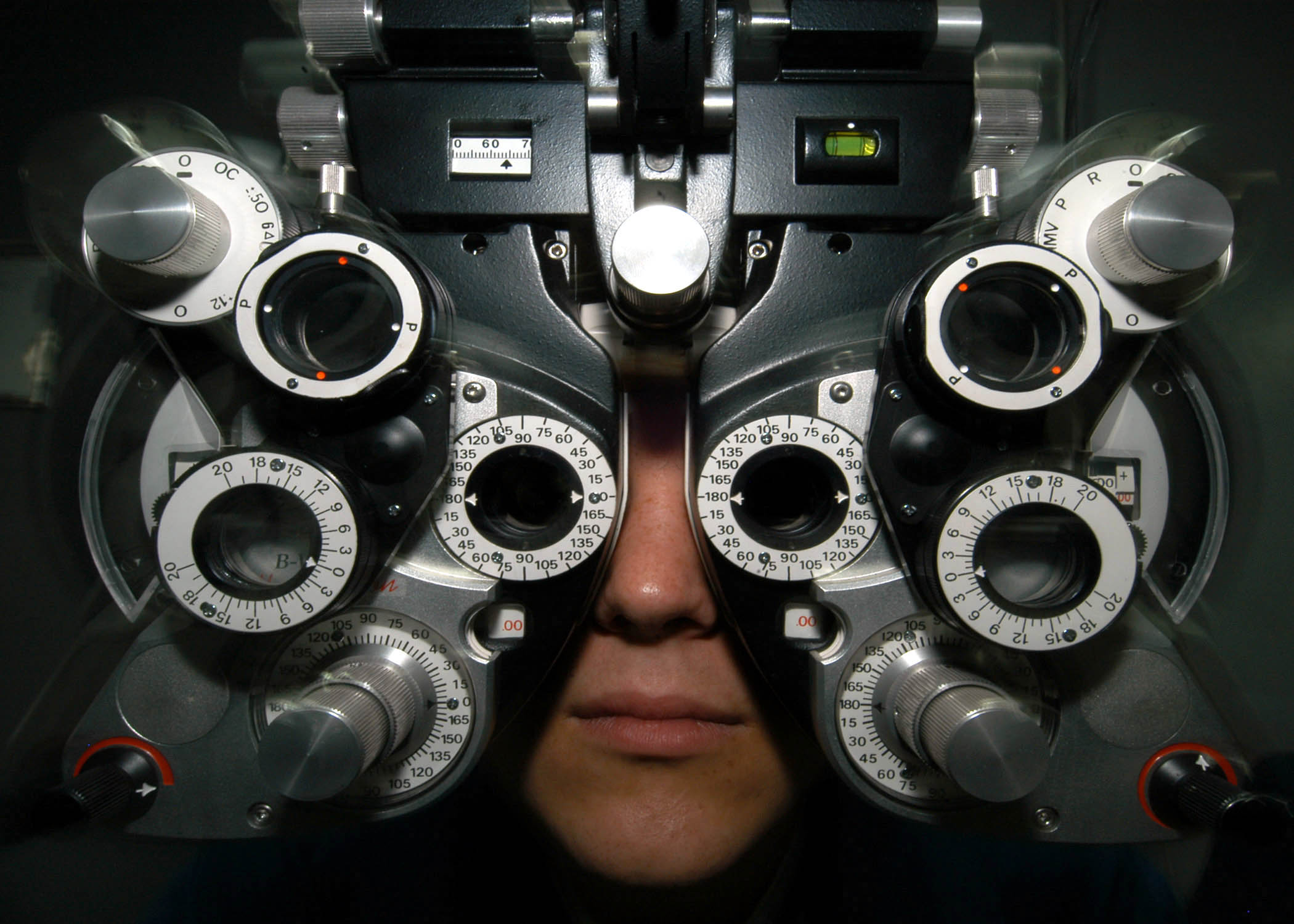
An optical refractor (phoropter) in use.

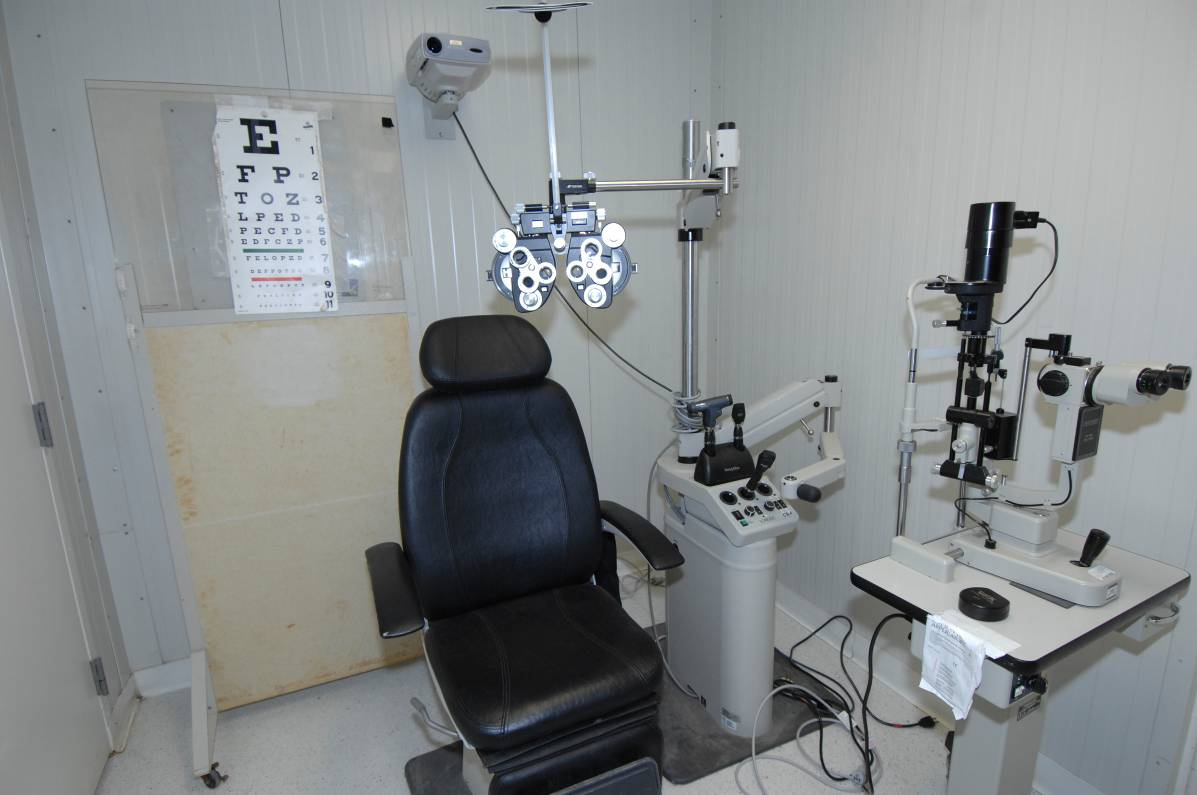
General optometry clinic setup

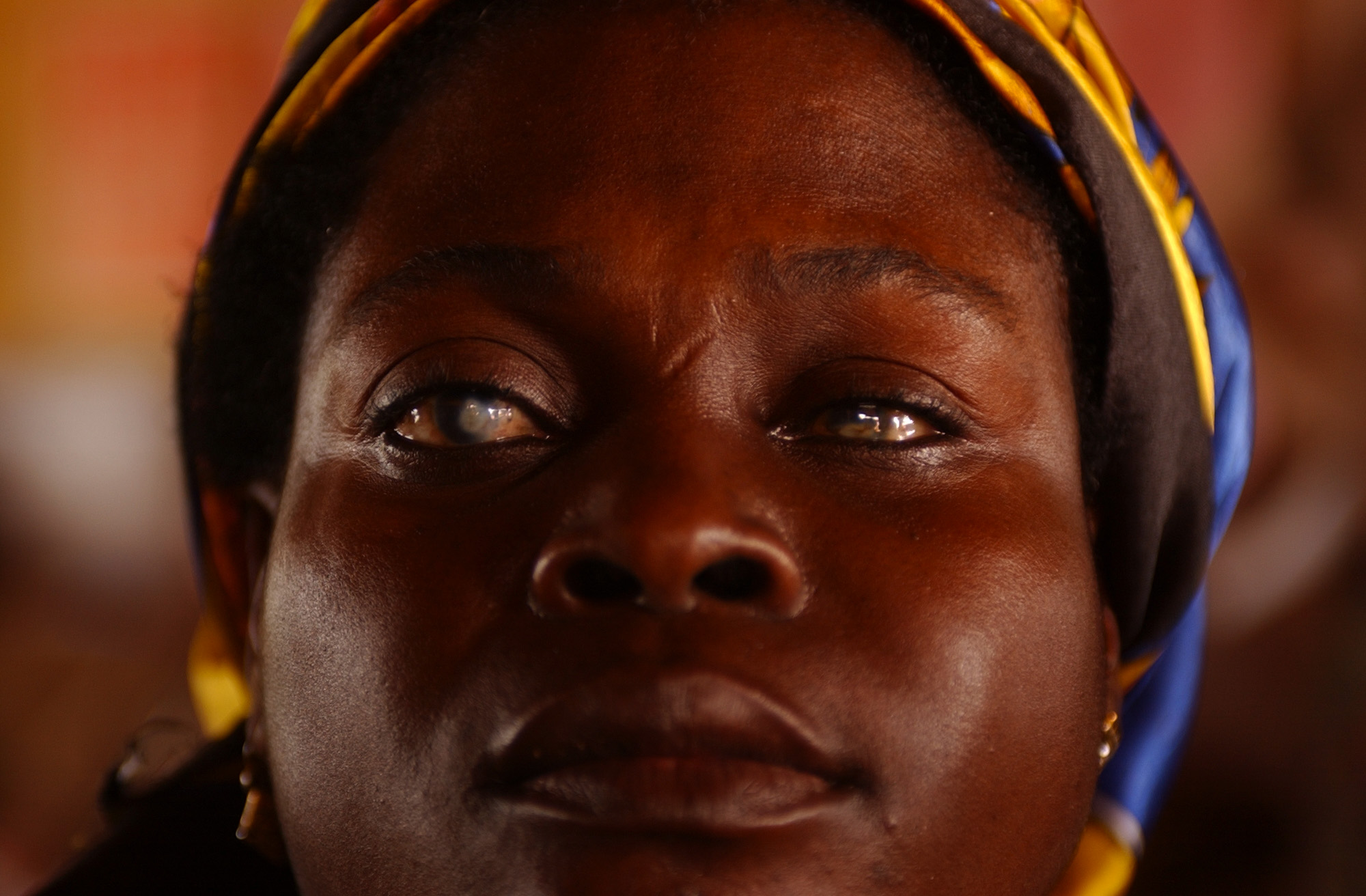
Cataracts in Ghana

Optometry is a relatively new field in eye care in Ghana.

== History ==
Optometry is a new field in the eye care system of Ghana. The Eye Secretariat of Ghana is the Ghana Ministry of Health agency concerned with eye care in the country. Ghana's first optometrist, Dr. Francis Kojovi Morny, is regarded as a key contributor to theme development of optometry there. Dr. Morny was trained in Nigeria, and returned to practice optometry after his training. He was the main brain behind the set-up of the Department of Optometry in University of Cape Coast to offer the Doctor of Optometry program and was also a senior lecturer in the department. He also served as a lecturer in KNUST when the program began.

The first optometry school in Ghana started in the KNUST Department of Physics in 1992. The first class had just five students and was instructed by Dr. Morny. It initially offered only postgraduate degrees, but soon also offered bachelor's degrees. In 2004, just as the first batch of optometrists with the bachelor's degrees had graduated, they were enrolled for the two-year Doctor of Optometry (O.D) program. In 2002, the University of Cape Coast also began a Doctor of Optometry program.

== Training ==
Over eighty percent of Ghanaian optometrists receive their training from the KNUST. In 2011, fifty-three and about sixteen students entered KNUST and UCC department of Optometry, respectively. Professor Angela O. Amedo, one of the first optometrists in Ghana, is the Head of Department for Optometry at KNUST. There are about 200 optometrists in Ghana.

== Newly qualified optometrists ==
The newly graduated optometrists are inducted into the Ghana Optometric Association so they can do their one-year internship at any of the Ministry of Health Hospitals or accredited eye clinics throughout the country. After their internship, they are required to write their qualifying exam which upon passing will allow the optometrist to practice without supervision. For a place to qualify to house new optometrists during their internship, there should be an optometrist or ophthalmologist working at the facility. Some of the places where new optometrists work in Ghana are:

- the 37 Military Hospital
- the Eastern Regional Hospital Koforidua
- the SAEMA District Hospital, Takoradi
- the Tamale Teaching Hospital Tamale
- the Central Regional Hospital, Cape Coast
- the Our Lady of Grace Hospital, Breman Asikuma
- the Bishop Ackon Memorial Eye Hospital (Christian Eye Clinic), Cape Coast
- the Volta Regional Hospital, Ho
- the Margret Marquart Hospital, Kpandu
- the Brong Ahafo Regional Hospital Sunyani
- the Ridge Hospital, Accra
- the Tema General Hospital
- the Komfo Anokye Teaching Hospital, Kumasi
- the Upper East Regional Hospital, Bolga
- the Upper West Regional Hospital, Wa
- the Korle Bu Teaching Hospital, Accra
- the Agogo Presbyterian Hospital, Agogo Asante Akyem

== Ghana Optometric Association ==
The Ghana Optometric Association (GOA) is the country's governing body for the optometry profession. Since 2009 all optometrists wanting to be members have had to write a professional exam. Passing this exam gives the optometrist the certification to practice in Ghana. As of March 2010, GOA had 139 members. Today the group has about 200 members. In 2010 the body and the Kwame Nkrumah University of Science and Technology's Faculty of Distance Learning rolled out a two-year programme to offer all members of GOA who did not have the Doctor of Optometry degree to enroll for it. The aim of the programme is to ensure that by the end of 2012 all optometrists in Ghana will have the O.D degree as is required under the Ministry of Health.

=== Executives ===
It is headed by Prof.Samuel Bert Boadi-Kusi as President of GOA. Dr.Yaw Osei Akoto is the Secretary.

== Ministry of Health and Optometrists ==
The Ministry of Health through its hospitals and health facilities is the main provider of eye care services in the country. Over the years it has taken various initiates to train optometrists through the various universities. It is its aim to ensure that there is at least one functioning eye unit in every district of the country. So far the number of facilities is woefully inadequate to serve the needs of those who need such services. The MOH is still doing its best to lift the practice of optometry in Ghana. At the 2010 induction ceremony for new Optometrist it promised to help regulate the activities of optometrists more The situation would have been far worse if the various eye care facilities of the Christian Health Association of Ghana (CHAG) were not functioning. Thirty-five percent of Ghana's health service provision is done by CHAG. As and when new district eye centre are created, an optometrist is posted there to attend to the district's eye care needs. To date, the MOH is the biggest employer of optometrists in the country and the MOH deems with all seriousness the role they play in helping to save the sight of Ghanaians.

== Optometry bill ==
There is no law regulating the practice of optometry in Ghana. Around 20% of people claiming to be optometrists in Ghana either do not have training in the field or "go beyond their scope of operation". A draft optometry bill has been presented to the cabinet, but is yet to be passed. The bill would give the Ghana Optometric Association the authority to regulate the practice of optometry in Ghana.
