= Childhood blindness =

Medical condition in children

- Snellen chart used to determine visual acuity
- Causes: Genetic disorder, Infection
- Diagnostic method: Pupillary reflex(among others)
- Prevention: Vitamin A supplement

Childhood blindness is an important contribution to the national prevalence of the disability of blindness. Blindness in children can be defined as a visual acuity of <3/60 in the eye with better vision of a child under 16 years of age. This generally means that the child cannot see an object 10 feet (about 3 meters) away, that a child with "normal" vision could see if it was 200 feet (about 60 meters) away.

== Cause ==
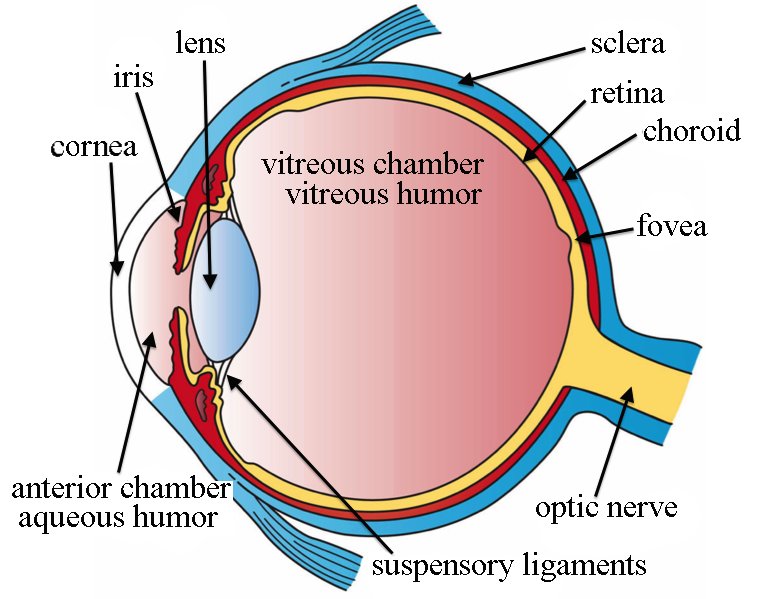
Human Eye

Childhood blindness has many causes. Leading causes include retinopathy of prematurity, vitamin A deficiency, infectious diseases (measles, newborn conjunctivitis), retinoblastoma, and congenital conditions (cataracts and glaucoma). Leber congenital amaurosis primarily affects the retina, and typically severe visual impairment begins in infancy. Mutations in Aryl hydrocarbon receptor interacting protein like-1 have been linked to Leber congenital amaurosis (LCA). The most frequently affected parts of the eyes are:

- Whole globe (36%)
- Cornea (36%)
- Lens (11%)
- Retina (6%)
- Optic nerve (5%)
- Uvea (2%)

=== Vitamin A deficiency ===
Vitamin A deficiency is most common in developing countries where many kids experience malnourishment. This vitamin deficiency blinds hundreds of thousands of kids each year, and is a preventable cause of childhood blindness. Since vitamin A is required for rhodopsin, the photosensitive pigment in the retinol rods, its deficiency can lead to night blindness.

=== Measles ===
Since 2010, globally 85% of children have been vaccinated for measles significantly reducing the number of measles cases each year. Children who have a vitamin A deficiency and measles infection can develop corneal ulcerations and keratomalacia due to immunosuppression caused by the vitamin deficiency.

=== Newborn conjunctivitis ===
Newborn conjunctivitis is present at the time of birth and presents within the first 28 days of life as a severe conjunctival infection with purulent discharge. This increases the risk of corneal ulcerations and perforations that can lead to blindness. The common organisms that lead to this diagnosis include Neisseria gonorrhoea and Chlamydia trachomatis. Infected pregnant women and their partners should be treated to avoid infection of the newborn, and newborns presenting with conjunctivitis should be treated with hourly topical antibiotic drops (gentamicin).

=== Retinopathy of prematurity ===
Retinopathy of Prematurity (ROP) is classified by the abnormal growth of blood vessels in the retina, a process called retinal neovascularization. These blood vessels may bleed or grow in the wrong direction. Bleeding can lead to the formation of scar tissue which can cause blurred vision and vision loss. If the vessels grow too far in the wrong direction, they can pull the retina away from the back of the eye – this is called retinal detachment. Retinal detachment is a medical emergency that can cause permanent blindness and thus requires urgent intervention.

Babies who are born prematurely (formally defined as 37 weeks of gestational age or earlier) are at higher risk of developing retinopathy of prematurity. The earlier a preterm baby is born, the greater the baby's risk of developing ROP. Blood vessels in the eye typically finish development by the time of birth. Therefore, a baby who is born early is exposed to various stimuli (oxygen, lights, temperature, etc.) that may influence how the blood vessels of the eye develop. Additional risk factors for ROP include low birth weight (3 pounds or less) and giving the baby excess amounts of oxygen following birth. If preterm infants are experiencing other health problems like anemia, vitamin E deficiency, and/or breathing problems, they are at increased risk of developing ROP.

== Diagnosis ==
The diagnosis of childhood blindness is done via methods to ascertain the degree of visual impairment in the affected child. Early detection is essential to provide early intervention to children. The American Academy of Ophthalmology recommend various screening methods starting in newborns and spanning throughout childhood in order to assess for childhood blindness and other ophthalmic disorders. Newborns are screened with the red reflex test performed by shining a light into the child's eyes. If a red reflex is not produced, further workups should be done to assess for congenital cataracts or retinoblastoma. From 6–12 months, children are screened at their well-child visits with the red reflex test, assessment of eye movement, and proper pupil dilation. From 1 year to 3 years of age, children often undergo a "photoscreening" test where a camera takes pictures of the child's eyes to assess for developmental abnormalities that may lead to amblyopia. Children ages 3 to 5 years of age will be assessed for proper eye alignment and visual acuity. Visual acuity is assessed with a Snellen chart with lines of letters that the child reads and helps determine visual acuity.

== Prevention ==
The chemical structure of Vitamin A (one of many chemical forms)

=== Vitamin A deficiency ===
Vitamin A deficiency is a leading cause of preventable childhood blindness, particularly in developing countries. Vitamin A deficiency is defined as a serum (blood) concentration of less than 0.70 μmol/L while a severe deficiency is defined as less than 0.35 μmol/L, per the Centers of Disease Control National Health and Nutrition Examination Survey. Vitamin A is supplied through the diet, and a deficiency often results from poor dietary intake of Vitamin A-rich foods. Low dietary levels of Vitamin A can be worsened by infections that cause inflammation in the gastrointestinal tract, which prevent the body from fully absorbing Vitamin A available within digested food. Children in the United States have a recommended Vitamin A dietary allowance of at least 300 micrograms/day. Good sources of Vitamin A include vegetables, such as carrots, papaya, and pumpkin. Animal products, such as fish oils, as well as dairy products (milk, cheese, and yogurt) are also sources of Vitamin A.

=== Retinopathy of prematurity ===
Retinopathy of prematurity (ROP) is a cause of childhood blindness that can occur around the time of birth. Generally, measures taken to avoid preterm birth are also effective at preventing ROP. Babies delivered preterm, defined at or before 37 weeks of gestation, have incomplete development of the blood vessels supplying the retina. At birth, increased exposure to oxygen from the environment and from medical interventions (such as a high flow nasal cannula) causes damage to retinal blood vessels and stunts their growth. Prevention of ROP in preterm babies involves careful monitoring of oxygen delivery to avoid excess exposure. Neonatal ocular exams can help detect ROP.

== Treatment ==
Whether blindness is treatable depends upon the cause. Surgical intervention can be performed in cases of primary congenital glaucoma. A 2020 review found no difference between combined trabeculotomy and trabeculectomy (CTT) and routine conventional trabeculotomy, or between visco-trabeculotomy and routine conventional trabeculotomy. The review also found that the 360-degree circumferential trabeculotomy may show greater surgical success than conventional trabeculotomy but that further research with one year follow-up was needed.

In a research paper published in February 2025, scientists reported that they had demonstrated a new therapy to be both safe and effective in improving the vision of and slowing retinal deterioration in young patients born with "LCA-AIPL1." Since their initial study, researchers have now treated a total of 11 children with AIPL1-LCA and seen improvement in the vision of each patient.

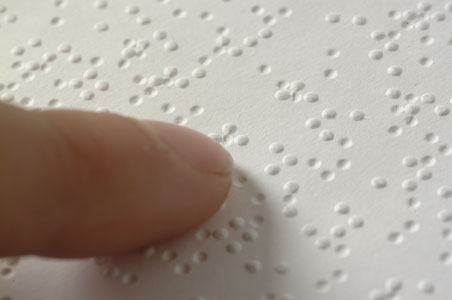
Braille

=== Management ===
Braille is a universal way to learn how to read and write, for the blind. A refreshable braille display is an assistive learning device that can help such children in school. Schools for the blind are a form of management, however the limitations of using studies done in such schools has been recognized. Children that are enrolled presently usually developed blindness 5 or more years prior to enrollment, consequently not reflecting current possible causes. About 66% of children with visual impairment also have one other disability (comorbidity), be it, intellectual disabilities, cerebral palsy, or hearing loss. Eye care/screening for children within primary health care is important, as catching ocular disease issues can lead to better outcomes overall.

== Epidemiology ==
Globally, the number children with blindness is approximately 1.4 million, representing 4% of the global blind population, and an additional 17.5 million are at risk of developing poor vision. Although this number is significantly lower than the number of blind adults, the estimated economic and social burden of blindness for children is much greater due to the increase in blind years. Childhood blindness is most prevalent among children with genetic ancestry from Africa and Asia, who represent 75% of the world's affected population. A 2014 review indicated that an estimated 238,500 children with bilateral blindness (rate 1.2/1,000) live in the Eastern Mediterranean region. There is also an increase in blindness outside of developing countries due to a lack of screening and prophylactic measures to treat causes of pediatric blindness.

== Society and culture ==
VISION 2020 is a program launched by the International Agency for the Prevention of Blindness (IAPB) and is supported by the WHO in 1999 that has made controlling blindness in children a high priority. In addition, the IAPB and WHO coordinate "World Sight Day" on the second Thursday of October each year. Starting in 2000, World Sight Day has become an opportunity to raise awareness of eye health and highlight the importance of increasing access to eye health services globally. It has also become a tool to influence governments around the world to allocate funds for blindness prevention programs and educational initiatives.
