= Nurses and Midwifery Council =

The Nursing and Midwifery Council of Ghana (N&MC) is the regulatory body that monitors, enlists and regulates the activities of nurses and midwives in Ghana. The body is also responsible for the examination of student nurses and midwives that leads to the award of their professional licensing. The mandate of the council is derived from the Part III of the Health Professions Regulatory Bodies Act, 2013 (Act 857). The Registrar for the council is Felix Nyante.

Over the years, the N&MC has demonstrated its commitment by strengthening relationships with its clients through ongoing dialogue and regular visits to its facilities across the country.
