= Oforikrom Municipal District =

- Municipal District
- Districts of Ashanti Region

- Location of Oforikrom Municipal District within Ashanti
- Coordinates: 6°41′N 1°35′W
- Country: Ghana
- Region: Ashanti
- Capital: Oforikrom

Area
  - Total: 49.34 km^{2} (19.05 sq mi)

Population (2021 Census)
  - Total: 213,126
  - Density: 4,320/km^{2} (11,190/sq mi)
- Time zone: UTC+0 (GMT)

Oforikrom Municipal District is one of the forty-three districts in Ashanti Region, Ghana. Originally it was a sub-metropolitan district council within the Kumasi Metropolitan Assembly until 15 March 2018, when it was elevated to municipal district assembly status to become Oforikrom Municipal District. The municipality is located in the central part of Ashanti Region and has Oforikrom as its capital town. The MCE for this district is Anwel Sadat Ahmed.
