= Christian Health Association of Ghana =

Christian Health Association of Ghana (CHAG) logo

The Christian Health Association of Ghana (CHAG) is the umbrella organization that coordinates the activities of the Christian Health Institutions and Christian Churches’ Health programmes in Ghana.

== Functions of CHAG ==
The main functions of CHAG are aimed at:

- serving the health needs of the poor and vulnerable populations that have been created by urbanisation.
- playing a complementary role to the Ministry of Health (MOH) and the Ghana Health Service (GHS)

== Membership ==
CHAG’s 183 Member Institutions are predominantly located in the rural (underserved) areas.
