= Chi Mei Corporation =

Taiwan-based performance materials company

CHIMEI Corporation 奇美實業
- Company type: Corporation
- Industry: Petrochemical
- Founded: 11 January 1960
- Founder: Shi Wen-long
- Headquarters: Rende, Tainan, Taiwan
- Key people: Shi Wen-long (Founder); Hsu Chun-hua (Chairman); Zhao Lingyu (General Manager)
- Products: Plastics, Synthetic Rubbers, Electronic Materials, Specialty Chemicals
- Website: www.chimeicorp.com

CHIMEI Corporation (Chinese: 奇美實業; pinyin: Qíměi Shíyè; CMC) is a Taiwan-based performance materials company. It has long been known as the world’s largest vendor of ABS resins. It also produces advanced polymer materials, synthetic rubbers, and specialty chemicals. It has factories in Tainan, Zhenjiang, and Zhangzhou.

CHIMEI Corporation is part of a privately held holding company called the CHIMEI Group, which has numerous subsidiaries. One of them is Chi Mei Optoelectronics (CMO), which was founded in 1997 as a subsidiary of Chi Mei Corporation. Chi Mei Group was the largest shareholder in publicly listed CMO. The new Chimei Innolux Corporation (Chinese: 奇美電子, CMI) is the world's fourth-largest and Taiwan's second-largest maker of TFT-LCD panels and the likely owner of Westinghouse Digital Electronics. Though CEO Douglas Woo has maintained the confidentiality of the ownership of the private Westinghouse licensee, they admit a significant vertically integrated relationship exists between the two. CHIMEI has sold Innolux shares; its stake in Innolux has fallen to 0.83 percent in Oct. 2021.

CHIMEI has a partnership with Mitsubishi Chemical Corporation of Japan.

== History ==
The company was founded by Shi Wen-long in 1960 as Chi Mei Industrial Company Ltd.; it was renamed CHIMEI Corporation in 1992. It was the first acrylic sheet manufacturer in Taiwan.

In 2001, the CHIMEI Group along with IBM Japan set up International Display Technology, which it subsequently sold to Sony in 2005. Hsu Wen-lung retired in 2005, allegedly under pressure from the Chinese government.

In 2010, CHIMEI Optoelectronics, then a subsidiary of CHIMEI Corporation, pleaded guilty to a price fixing conspiracy with respect to sales of TFT-LCDs between 2001 and 2006.

== See also ==
- Chi Mei Museum
- List of companies of Taiwan
