= CUMT =

CUMT may refer to:

- China University of Mining and Technology in Xuzhou, Jiangsu
- Chung Hwa University of Medical Technology in Tainan, Taiwan
