= Ten Drum Rende Creative Park =

Coordinates: 22.9403°N 120.2304°E

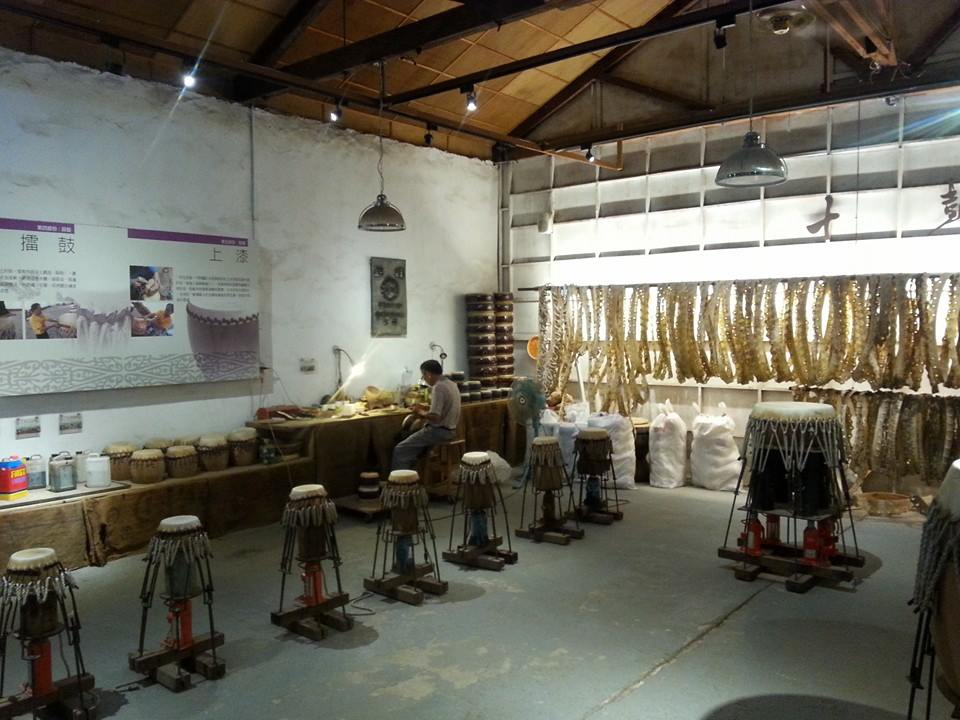
A corner of the Drum Museum featured at the Ten Drum Culture Village, showcasing different kinds of drums from East Asian countries.

Located in the Rende District of Tainan, Taiwan, Ten Drum Rende Creative Park was once a busy sugar mill but had been left disused for years. After being taken over by the local drumming troupe Ten Drum Art Percussion Group as a rehearsal space, this mill continues to live its history and allows visitors to peek into the thriving sugar industry during the Japanese Colonial Era.

== History ==
After World War II, many sugar mills left by the Japanese became disused due to upgrading industries and soaring land prices. They were either razed to the ground so the land could be sold to financial groups, or preserved and remodeled into a cultural hub such as Ten Drum Rende Creative Park.

== Factory ==
Permanently closed in 2003, the factory itself remains almost intact, from rusty machinery to molasses storage tanks and pipelines, delivering a nostalgia of years gone by.

== Ten Drum Art Percussion Group ==
In 2005, the percussion group decided to settle in this old-fashioned sugar mill as it sits in the middle of nowhere and therefore serves as a perfect rehearsal and practice space to run through their routines without fear of disturbing their neighbors as in the city.
