= Prokopov (surname) =

Prokopov (Russian: Проко́пов; feminine: Prokopova, Russian: Проко́пова) is a Russian surname. Notable people with the surname include:

- Svitlana Prokopova (born 1993), Ukrainian rhythmic gymnast
- Valentin Prokopov (born 1929), Russian water polo player
- Yevgeniy Prokopov (born 1950), Ukrainian sculptor
