= Shi Wen-long =

Taiwanese businessman (1928–2023)

- 許文龍
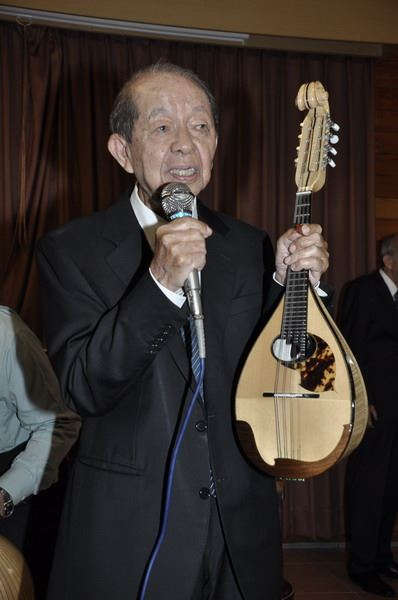
- Wen-long in 2012
- Born: 25 February 1928; Tainan, Taiwan, Empire of Japan
- Died: 18 November 2023 (aged 95); Tainan, Taiwan
- Occupation: Businessperson

Shi Wen-long or Hsu Wen-lung (Chinese: 許文龍; pinyin: Xǔ Wénlóng; Wade–Giles: Hsü Wen-lung; Pe̍h-ōe-jī: Khó͘ bûn-liông; 25 February 1928 – 18 November 2023) was a Taiwanese businessman and the founder of Chi Mei Corporation, the largest maker of ABS resin in the world. He was ranked among Forbes' world's richest people. He was the chairman of Chi Mei until his resignation in 2004, although he still held significant stakes in the company and sat on its board.

Shi was a senior advisor to Chen Shui-bian during his presidency and was known to support pro-Taiwan independence causes, a stance which made him unpopular with mainland China. He claimed that Taiwanese women who acted as comfort women during Japanese rule were not forced to do so, which created much controversy. Reportedly, Chi Mei Group faced pressure from the Chinese government, and after the Anti-Secession Law passed in 2005, Shi renounced Taiwan independence.

In 1992, Shi founded the Chimei Museum, which collects valuable string instruments made by Antonio Stradivari, Guarneri del Gesù, and other famous artisans. The museum holds the world's largest collection of violins. Shi was an amateur performing concert violinist.

Shi Wen-long died on 18 November 2023, at the age of 95.
