= Rende railway station =

Railway station in Tainan, Taiwan

Rende Station 仁德車站
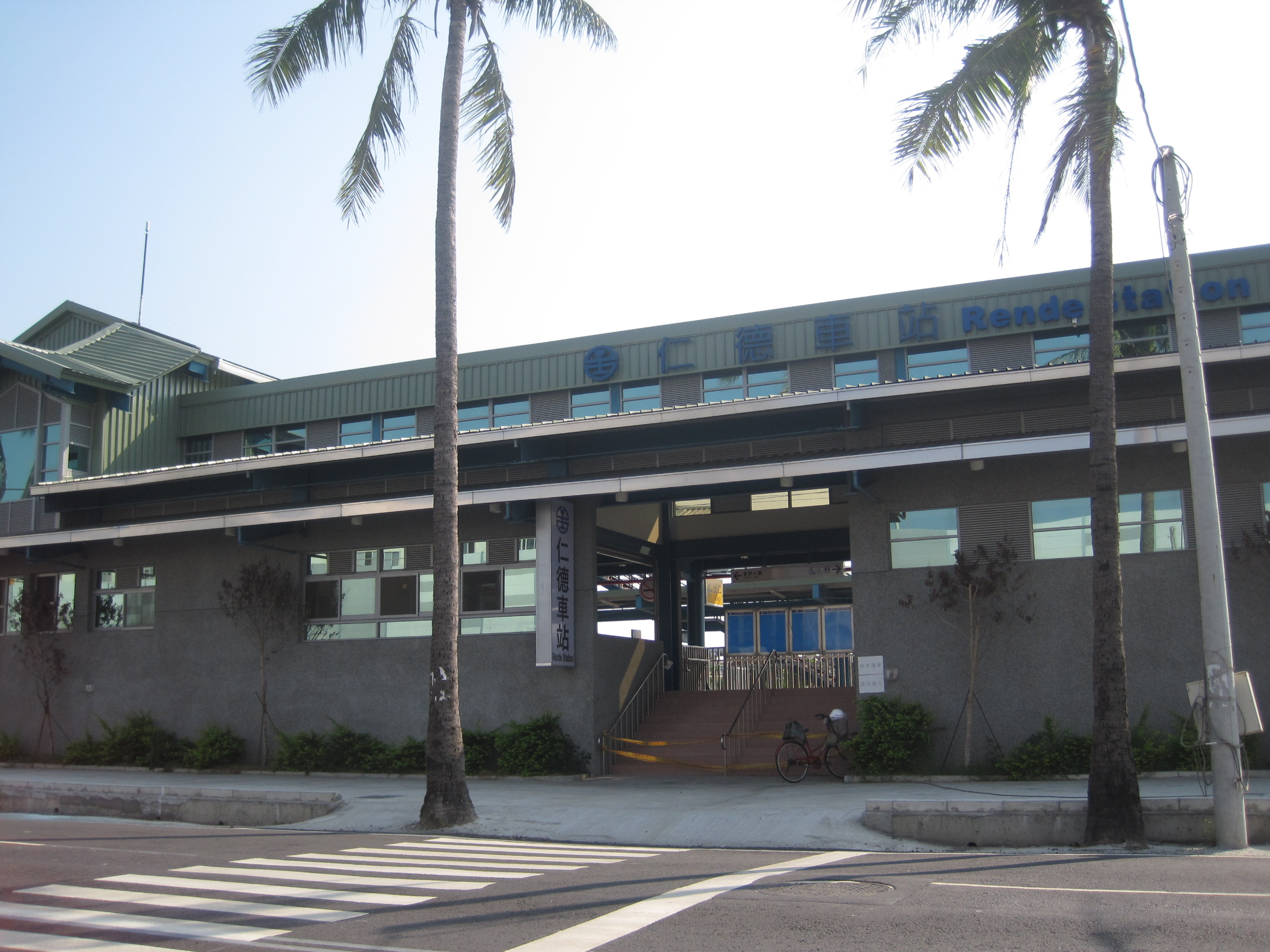

General information
- Location: Rende, Tainan, Taiwan
- Coordinates: 22.92321°N 120.240435°E
- Owner: Taiwan Railway Corporation
- Operator: Taiwan Railway Corporation
- Line: West Coast
- Train operators: Taiwan Railway Corporation

History
- Opened: 10 January 2014

Passengers
- 1,652 daily (2024)
Location

Rende (traditional Chinese: 仁德車站; simplified Chinese: 仁德车站; pinyin: Réndé Chēzhàn) is a railway station on Taiwan Railway West Coast line located in Rende District, Tainan, Taiwan.

== History ==
The station was opened on 10 January 2014.

== See also ==
- List of railway stations in Taiwan

Preceding station	Taiwan Railway	Following station
Bao'an towards Keelung	Western Trunk line	Zhongzhou towards Pingtung
