= Furniture Manufacturing Eco Museum in Tainan =

Museum in Rende, Tainan, Taiwan

- 家具產業生態博物館
- Established: May 2005
- Location: Rende, Tainan, Taiwan
- Coordinates: 22°55′26″N 120°13′22″E
- Type: museum
- Owners: Yung Shing Furniture Co., Ltd.
- Website: Official website (in Chinese)

The Furniture Manufacturing Eco Museum in Tainan (traditional Chinese: 家具產業生態博物館; simplified Chinese: 家具产业生态博物馆; pinyin: Jiājù Chǎnyè Shēngtài Bówùguǎn) is a museum in Rende District, Tainan, Taiwan.

== History ==
The museum building was originally the factory of Yongxing Furniture built in 1958. The factory building was converted to museum after 50 years of its furniture manufacturing processes due to its relocation to Mainland China. Planning and renovation works were done in three years and the museum was officially opened in May 2005.

== Architecture ==
The museum was constructed with 1960s and 1970s architectural style of Taiwanese houses.

== Exhibitions ==
The museum exhibits the history and evolution of the furniture industry in Taiwan. It also displays some classic domestic and international wooden furniture.

== Transportation ==
The museum is accessible within walking distance southwest from Bao'an Station of the Taiwan Railway.

== See also ==
- List of museums in Taiwan
