= Chimei Museum =

Museum in Rende, Tainan, Taiwan

- 臺南都會公園奇美博物館
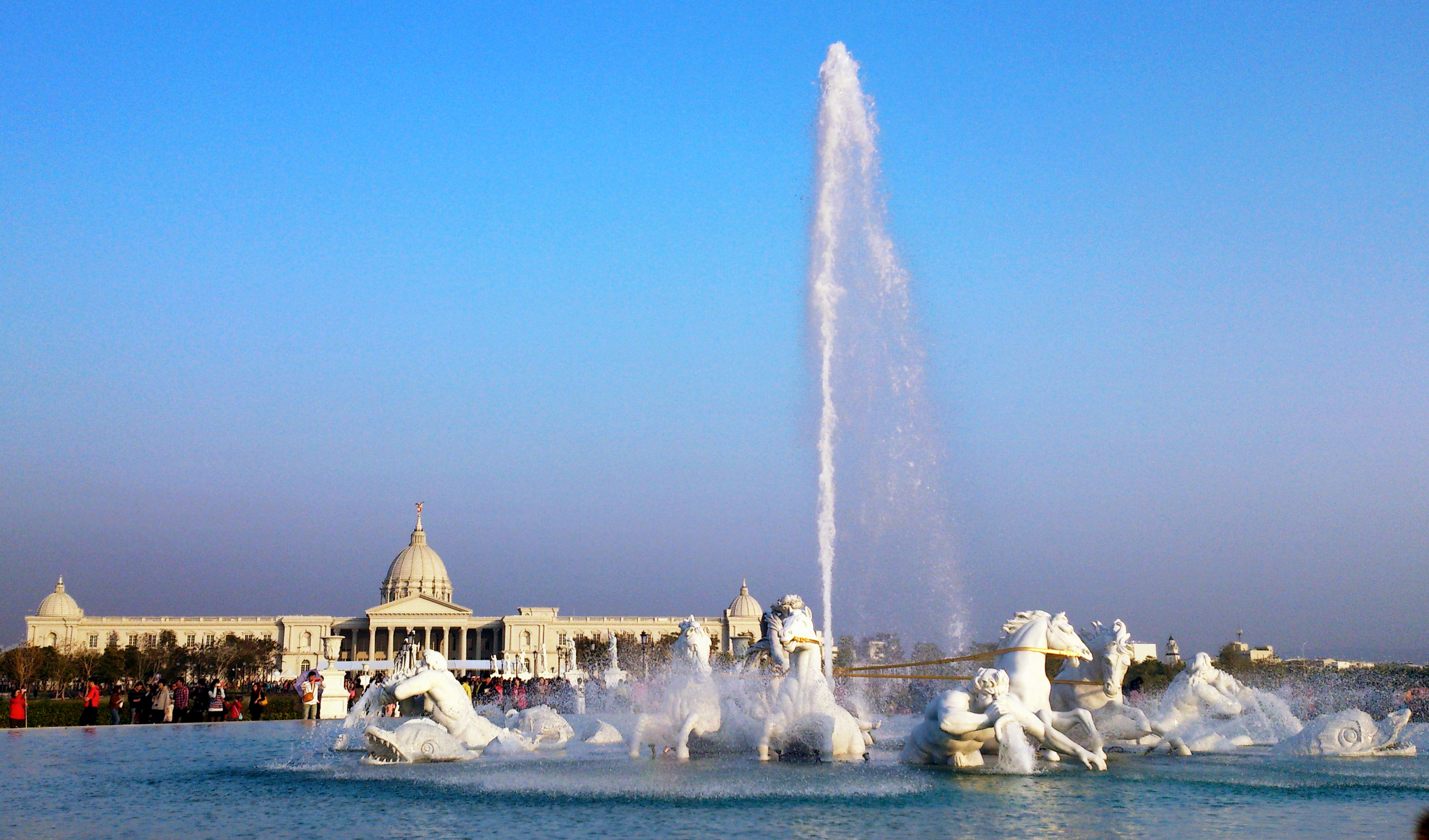
- Established: 1992
- Location: No. 66, Sec. 2, Wenhua Rd., Rende, Tainan 71755, Taiwan
- Coordinates: 22°56′4.53″N 120°13′33.23″E
- Type: Museum
- Collection size: 12,000 (2016)
- Visitors: 1.5 million (2015)
- Founder: Shi Wen-long
- Director: Ling-Ling Kuo
- Architect: Tsai Yi-cheng (蔡宜璋)
- Website: www.chimeimuseum.org

The Chimei Museum (Chinese: 奇美博物館; pinyin: Qíměi Bówùguǎn; Wade–Giles: Chʻi²-mei³ Po²-wu⁴-kuan³) is a private museum established in 1992 by Shi Wen-long of Chi Mei Corporation in Rende District, Tainan, Taiwan. The museum's collection is divided into five categories: Fine arts (including painting, sculpture, decorative arts and period furniture); Musical instruments; Natural history and fossils; Arms and armor; Antiquities and artifacts. The museum is known for housing the world's largest violin collection and for its significant collections of ancient weapons and sculptures. Forbes magazine, in its February 1996 article on private collectors in Asia, called the Chimei Museum "one of the world's most surprising art collections." The museum moved to its current venue on Wenhua Road in 2014, and it is open to the public except on designated days.

== Background ==
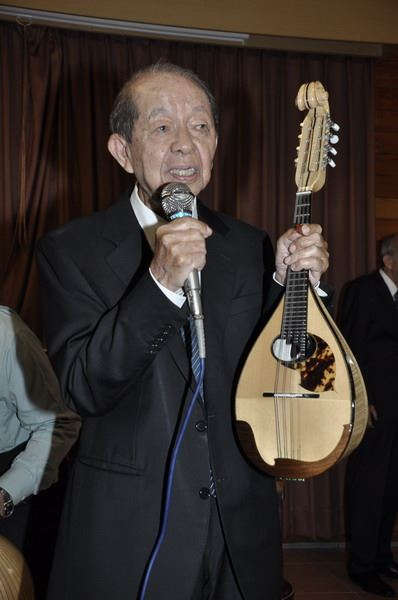
Founder Shi Wen-long

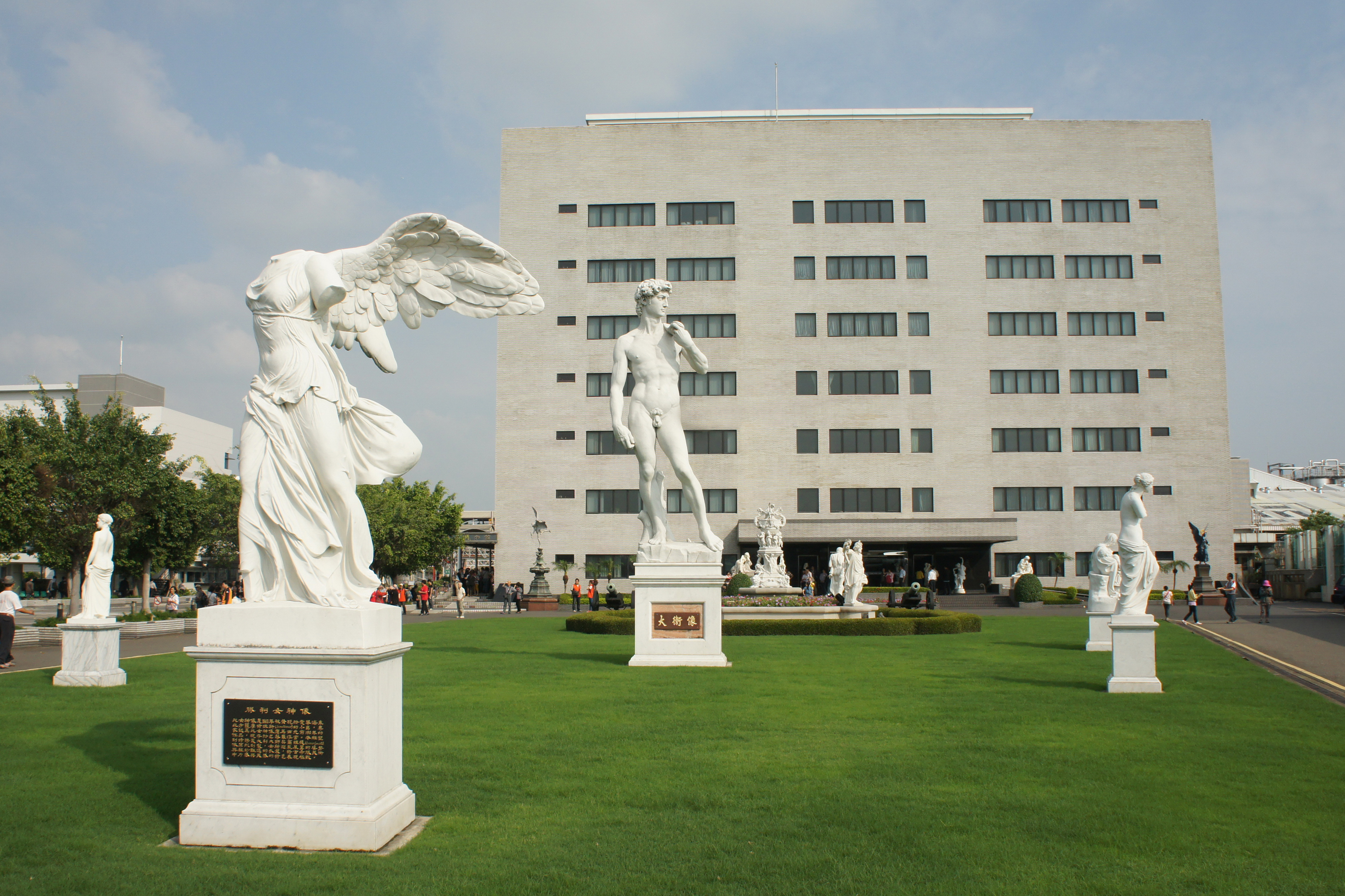
Original building of the Chi Mei Museum

The museum was first established and housed in an administration building of the Chi Mei Corporation in 1992 by the company's founder Shi Wen-long, then relocated to the Tainan Metropolitan Park in 2014, and reopened in 2015. Shi is known for his collection of antique violins housed in the museum. Besides being an entrepreneur, Shi is also an amateur violinist who has performed in public many times. To improve the level of classical music and western art in Taiwan, he founded the Chi Mei Culture Foundation in 1977 and has been providing scholarships through the Chimei Arts Award to developing artists in both classical music and fine arts since 1988.

Born in 1928 during wartime to a family of 10 children, Shi found escape at a "small local museum in Tainan." He later founded Chi Mei Museum in 1992 with the idea of building a museum for all, especially the underprivileged and those "who don't have a chance to travel and see museums abroad." He was an amateur performing concert violinist. Shi Wen-long died on 18 November 2023, at the age of 95.

== Building ==
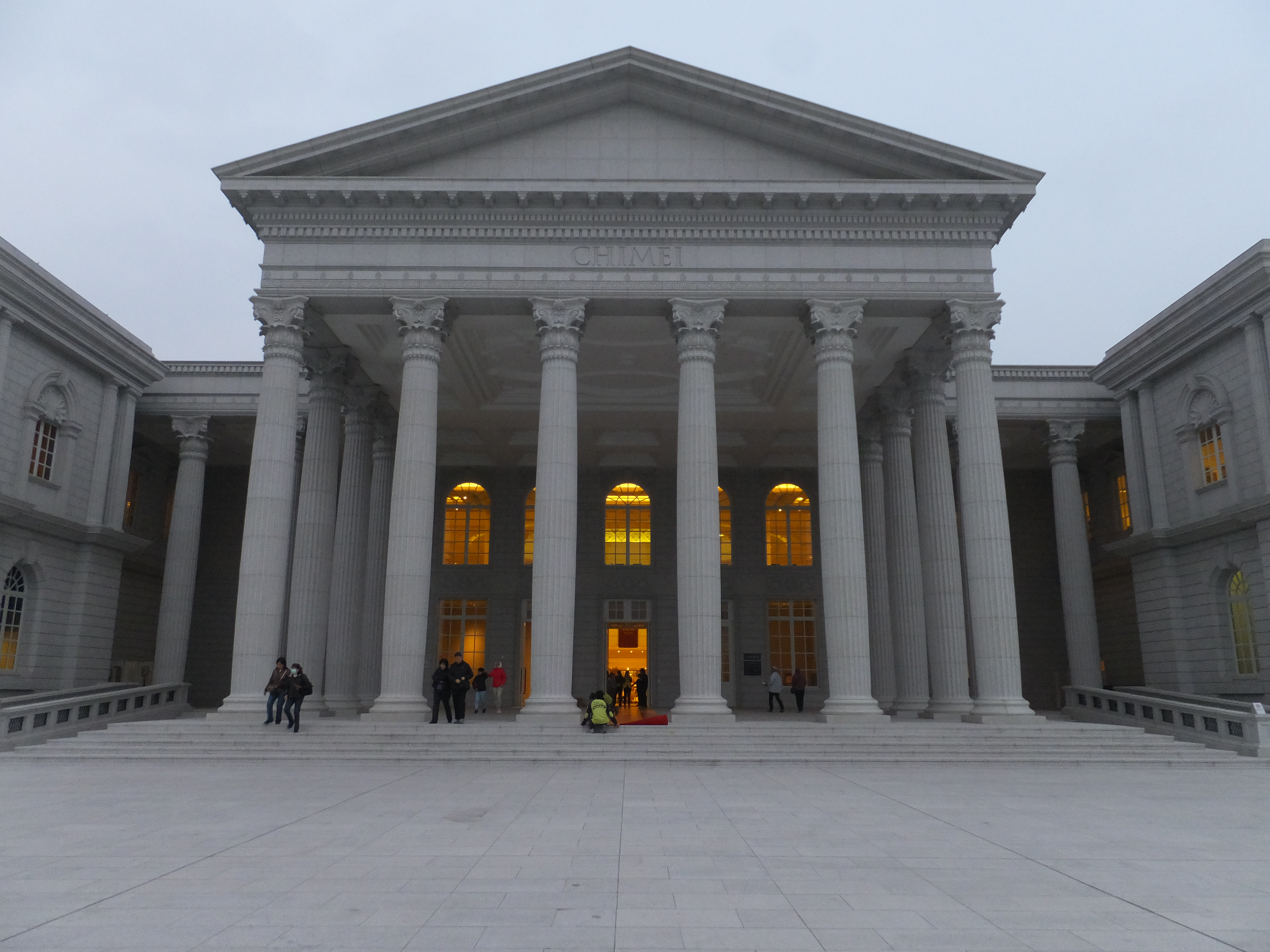
Main entrance

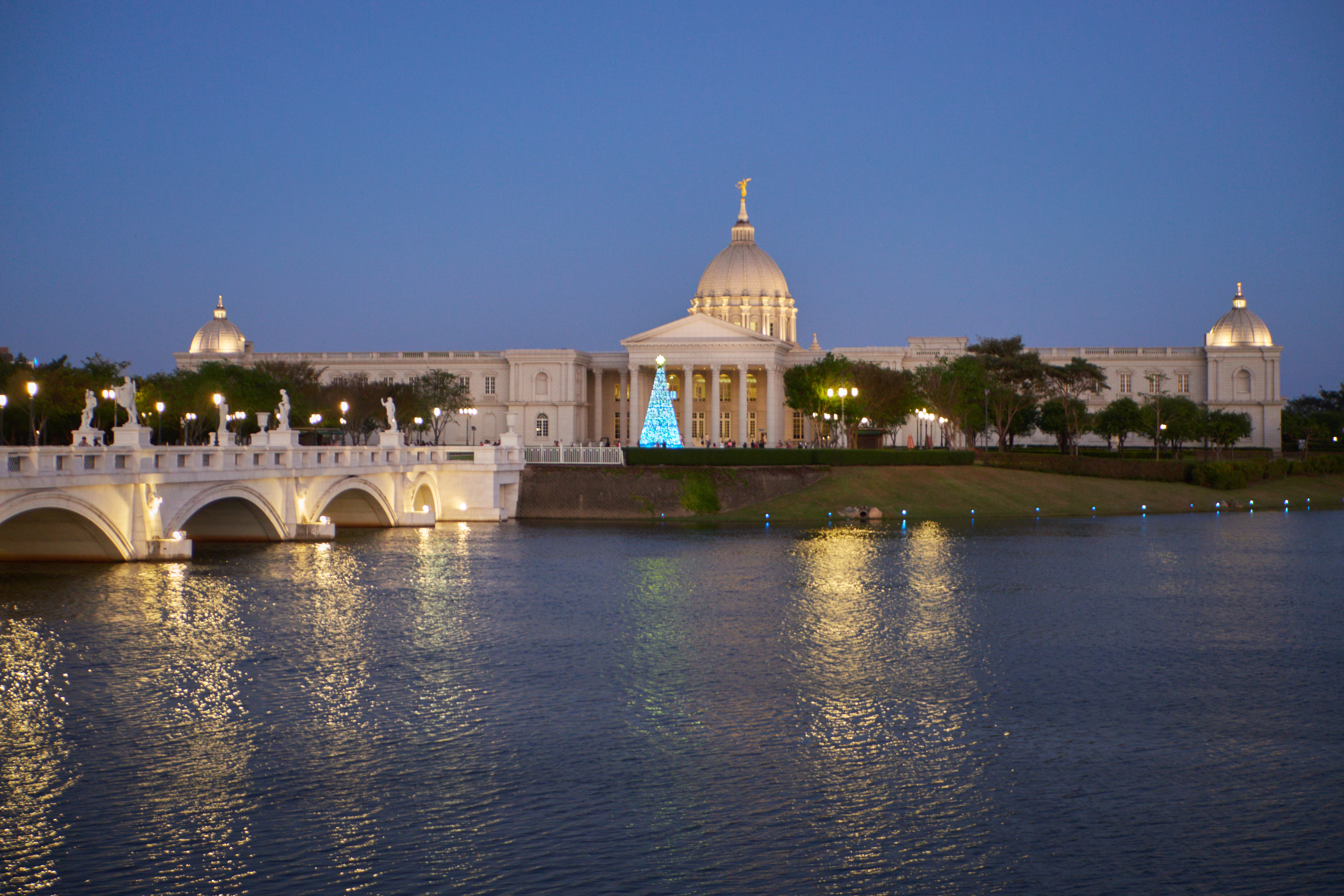
The Chimei Museum viewed across its ornamental lake

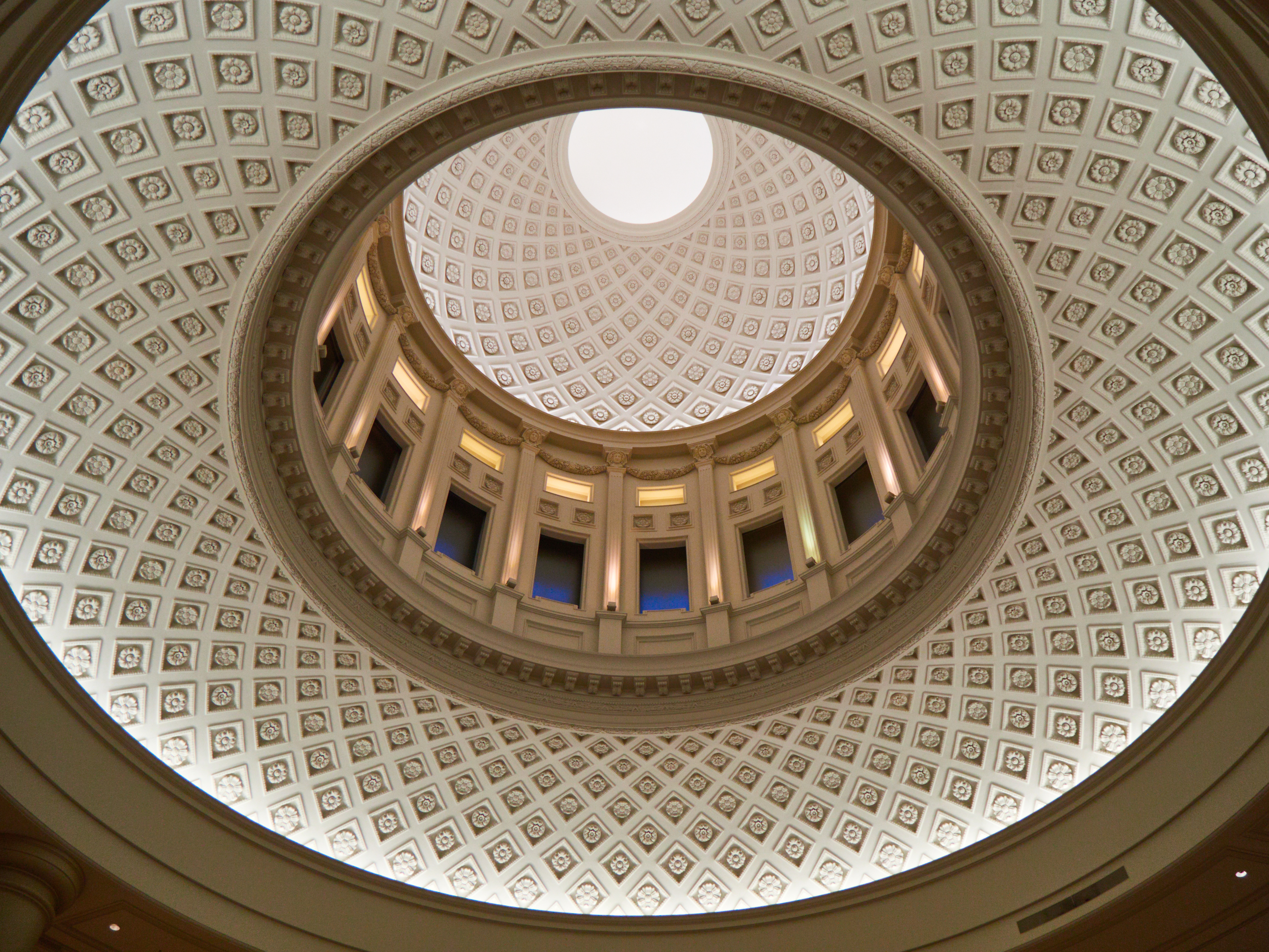
Interior view looking up into the coffered dome of the Chimei Museum rotunda

The museum was designed by architect Tsai Yi-cheng based on a design brief that it inspire a cultural renaissance by incorporating the best of western culture. Because of this the museum is ornamented with large number of Classical architecture elements. It is energy efficient and has a LEED Silver rating. Its facades are decorated with all three Classical orders: Corinthian order for portico, Ionic and Doric orders for upper tier. The museum's main building cost NT$2 billion to build.

The museum has a complete luthier's workshop to support the instrument collection.

== Grounds ==
A replica of the Bassin d'Apollo greets visitors at the museum entrance. The 1:1 replica was unveiled in 2014. The museum commissioned French artist Gilles Perrault in 2008 to reproduce the Fountain of Apollo, same as the one in Palace of Versailles. It took three years for modern laser measuring and the plaster mold to be made in France for the reproduction sculpture, and another three years to carve the marbles in the city of Carrara, Italy.

Between the Chimei Museum and the Fountain of Apollo sits the "Olympus Bridge", which features statues of the Twelve Olympians on both sides.

The "Muse Plaza" is located between the Olympus Bridge and the main building, named after the Muses, the mythological figures that gave rise to the term "museum".

== Exhibitions ==
The museum has several exhibition areas, including fine arts, natural history and fossils, arms and armour, musical instruments, and sculptures. The museum has a collection of European paintings from the 13th to the 20th century, presenting the development of western art. The historic weapon exhibition presents weapons from prehistoric time, the Bronze Age, the Iron Age to modern times. The collection features few artifacts from Taiwan or areas close to it as the main idea of the collection is to allow Taiwanese people to see artwork and pieces that they otherwise would have to travel a long way and spend a lot of money to see. The museum's founder grew up disadvantaged and wants to ensure that local children can be inspired by global culture even if their families do not have the resources to travel extensively.

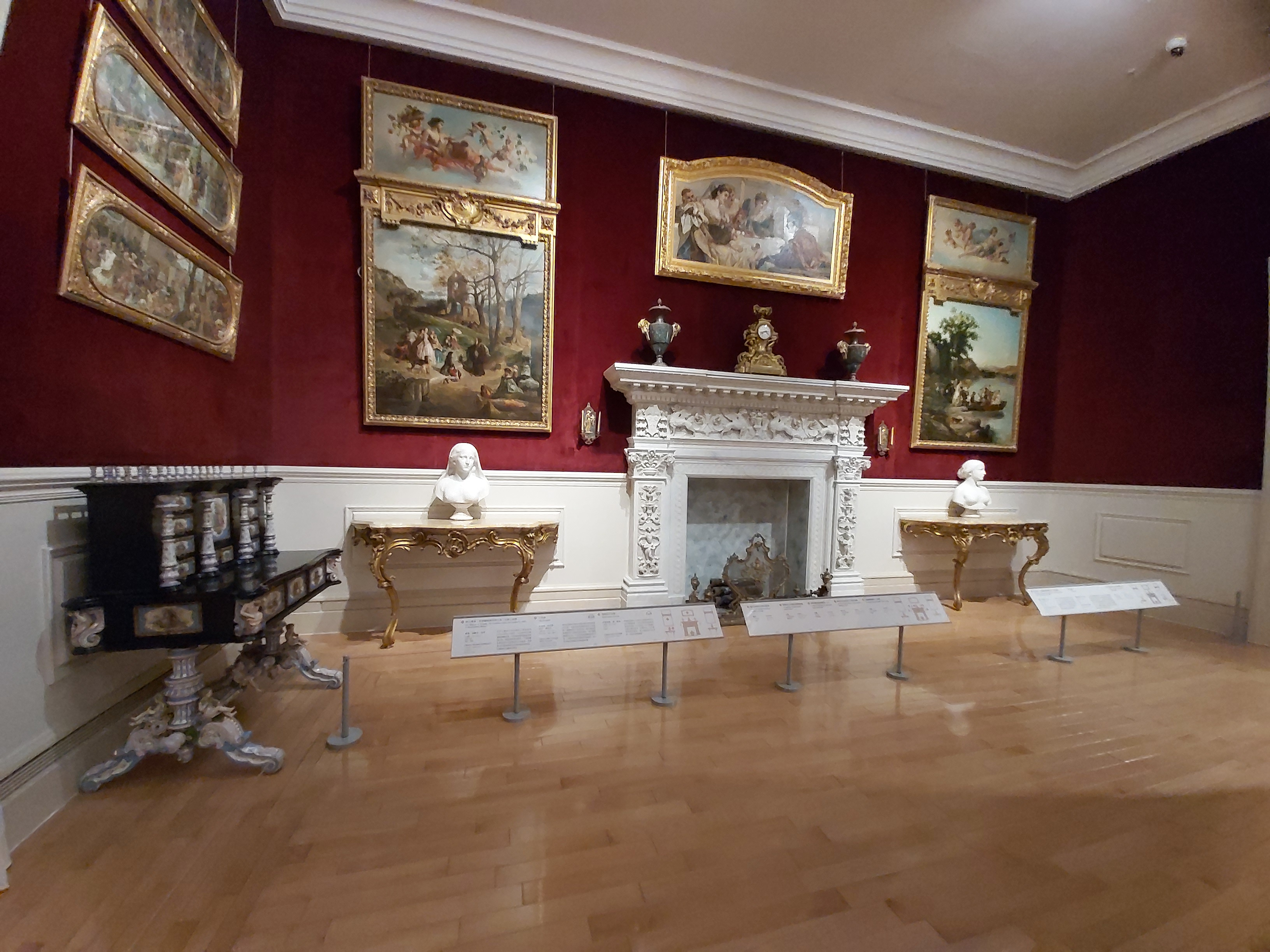
Fine arts

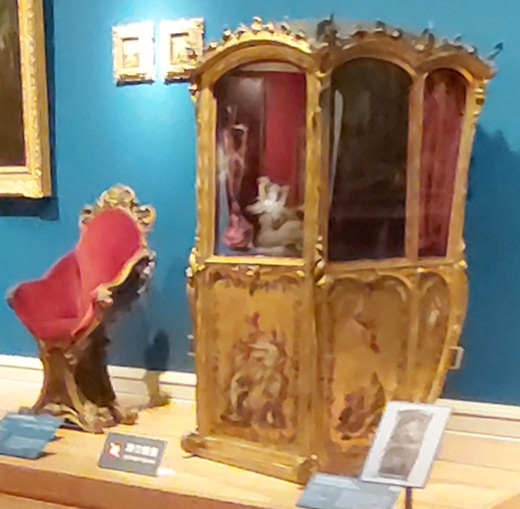
An Italian Neapolitan Ormolu-mounted, Vernis Martin and Gilded Wood Sedan Chair

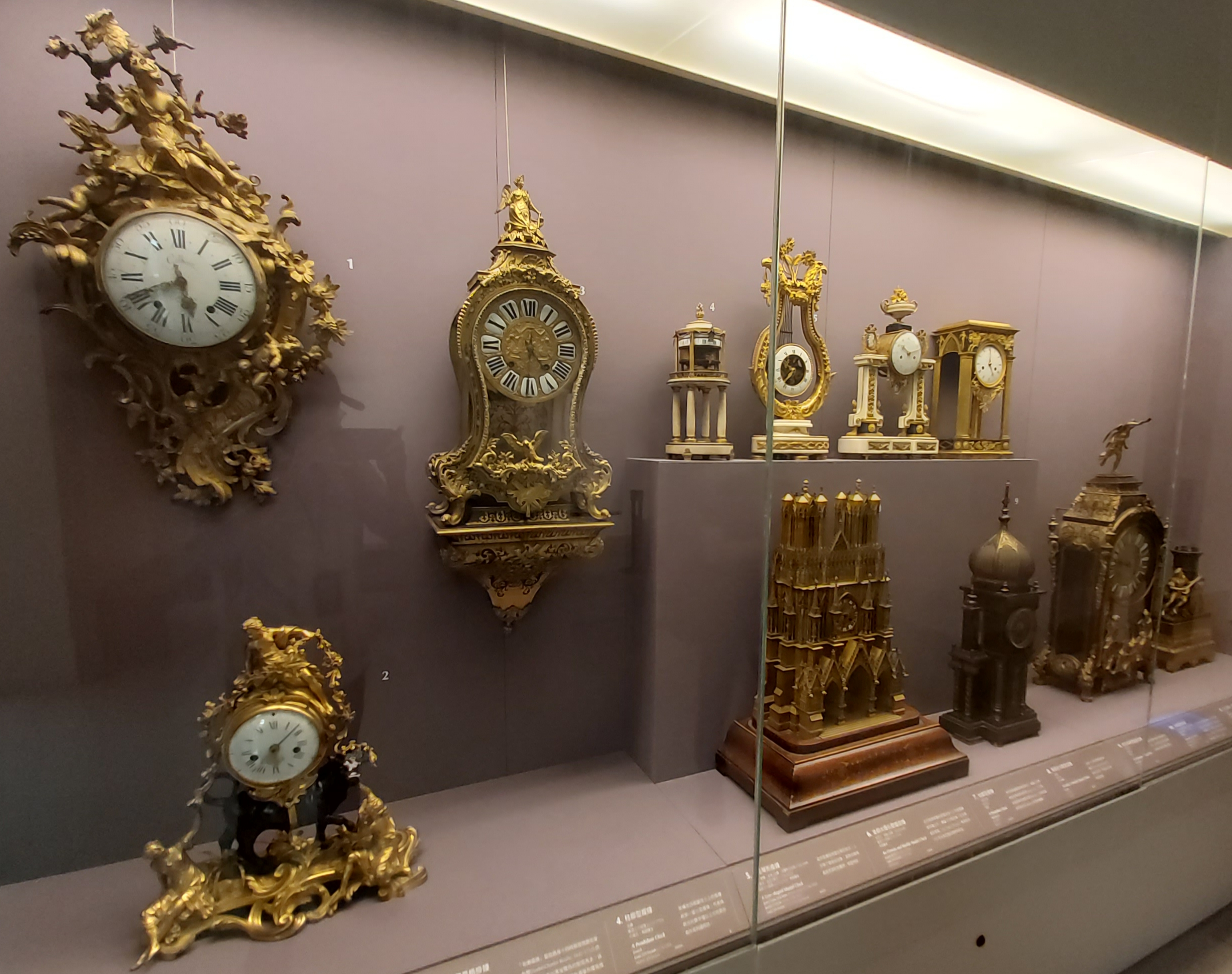
Clocks

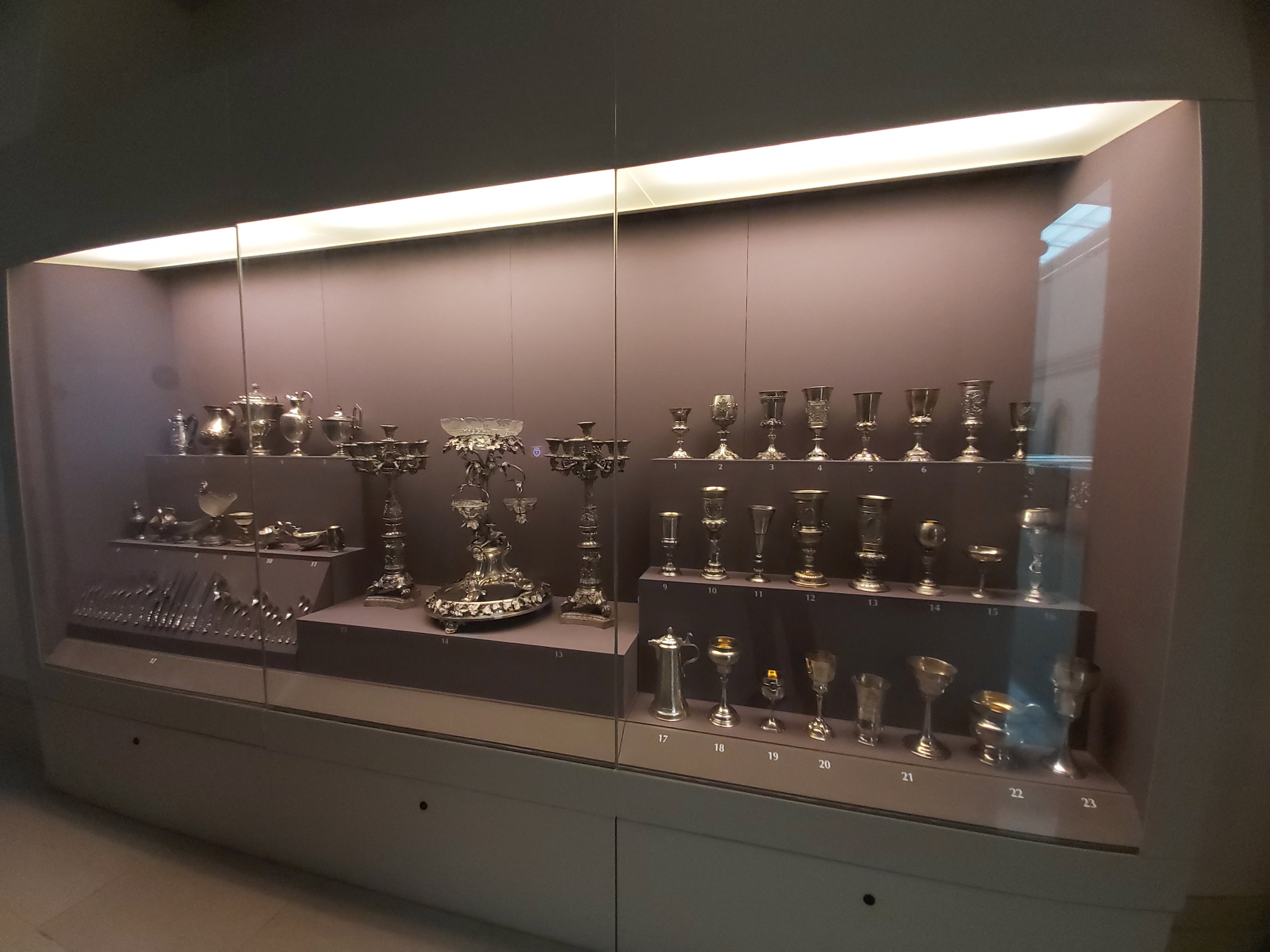
Household silvers

=== Musical instruments ===
Wen-Long Shi, the founder of the museum, was an amateur violinist and the Museum's collection began as his own personal collection. The museum collects musical instruments of historical significance, in particular violins and other string instruments by Antonio Stradivari, Guarneri del Gesù, Jacob Stainer, Amati, Rogeri, Joseph Guarneri Filius Andrea, Vincenzo Rugeri, Seraphin, Gagliano, Guadagnini and other famous artisans. The collection is noted for the Guarneri del Gesù "Ole Bull" violin of 1744, which is believed to be the last work of the famed artisan. As of 2019, the museum houses more than 1,370 violins and has allowed more than 3,000 violinists to borrow from the collection, with more than 220 violins out on loan. The museum loans the antique instruments to distinguished musicians free of charge. In 1999, Yo-Yo Ma borrowed the Pawle Stradivarius cello for a concert in Taipei. In 2015, Yu-Chien Tseng won the silver prize (no gold prize was awarded) at the 15th International Tchaikovsky Competition with the Castelbarco-Tarisio Guarnerius violin from the museum. As of 2021 the collection was the world's largest.

==== Notable instruments ====
- Viotti Stradivarius

=== Artworks ===
- The Madonna of Humility - Paolo di Giovanni Fei (Italy, 1345–1411)
- Suffer the Little Children to Come unto Me - Lucas Cranach the Younger (Germany, 1515–1586)
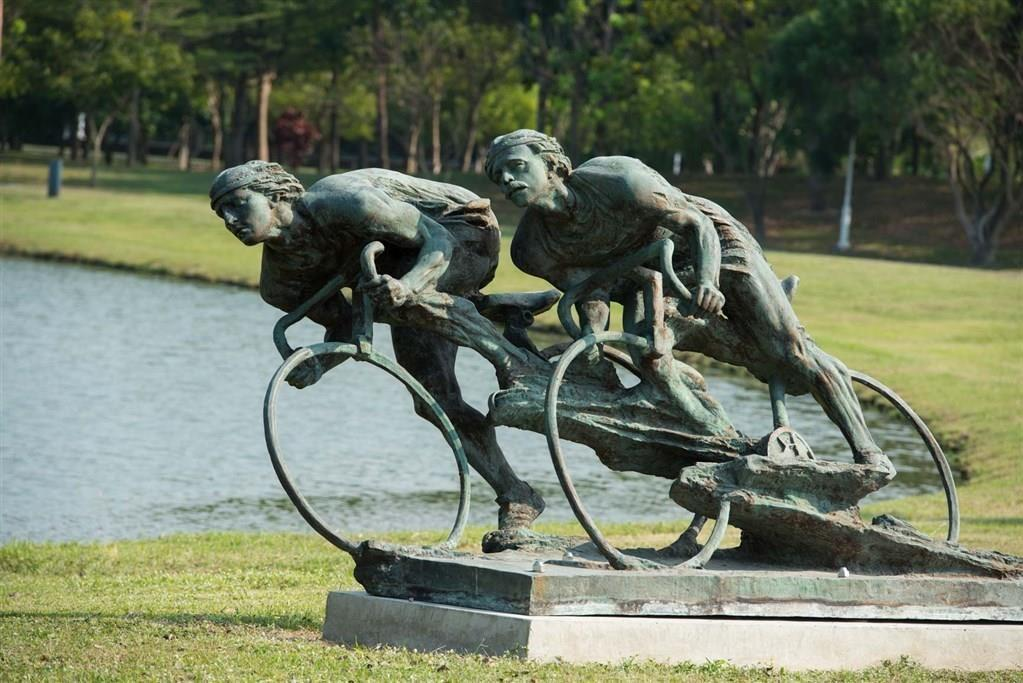
  Two Cyclists by Yevgeniy Prokopov and Nikolay Oleynik
- Saint Martin and the Beggar - El Greco (Spain, 1540/50-1614)
- Charity - Jacques Blanchard (France, 1630–1638)
- The Last Tears - Narcisse Virgilio Díaz de la Peña (France, 1807–1876)
- Charity - Friedrich von Amerling (Austria, 1803–1887)
- The Blessing of the Wheat - Jules Breton (France 1827–1906)
- Two Cyclists - Yevgeniy Prokopov (Ukraine, 1950), Nikolay Oleinik (Ukraine, 1953-2014).
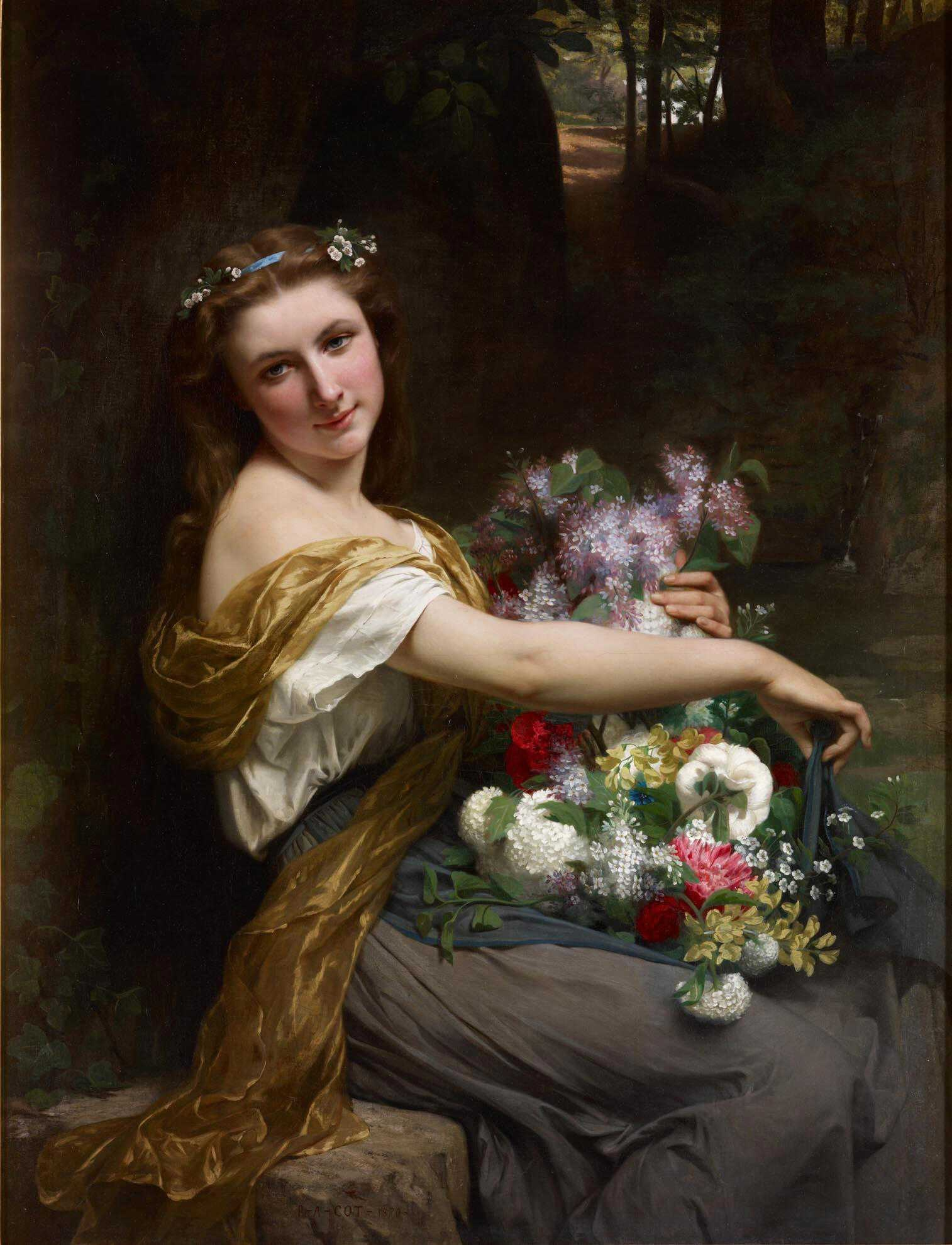
Pierre Auguste Cot Dionysia (1870)

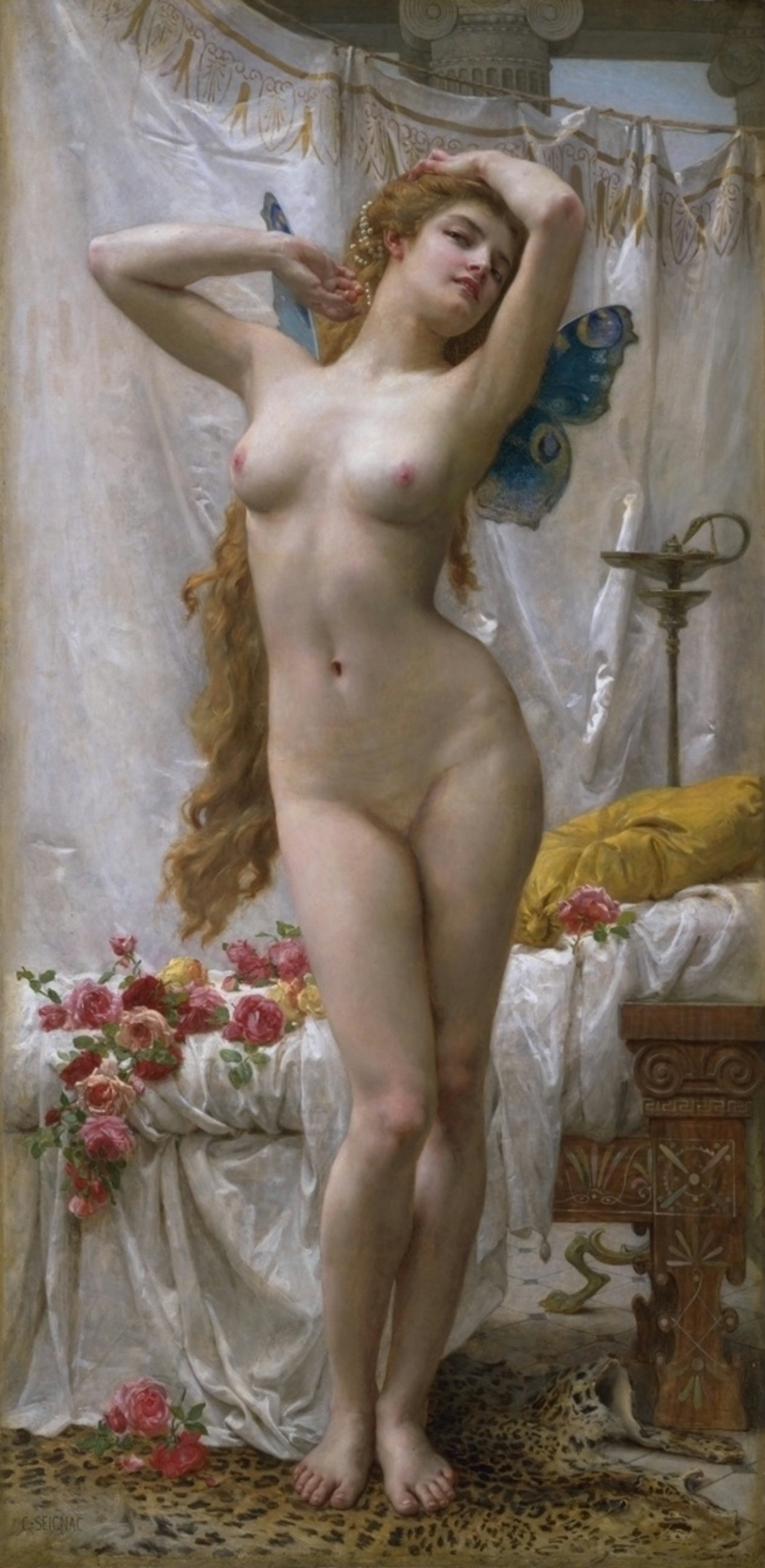
Guillaume Seignac The Awakening of Psyche

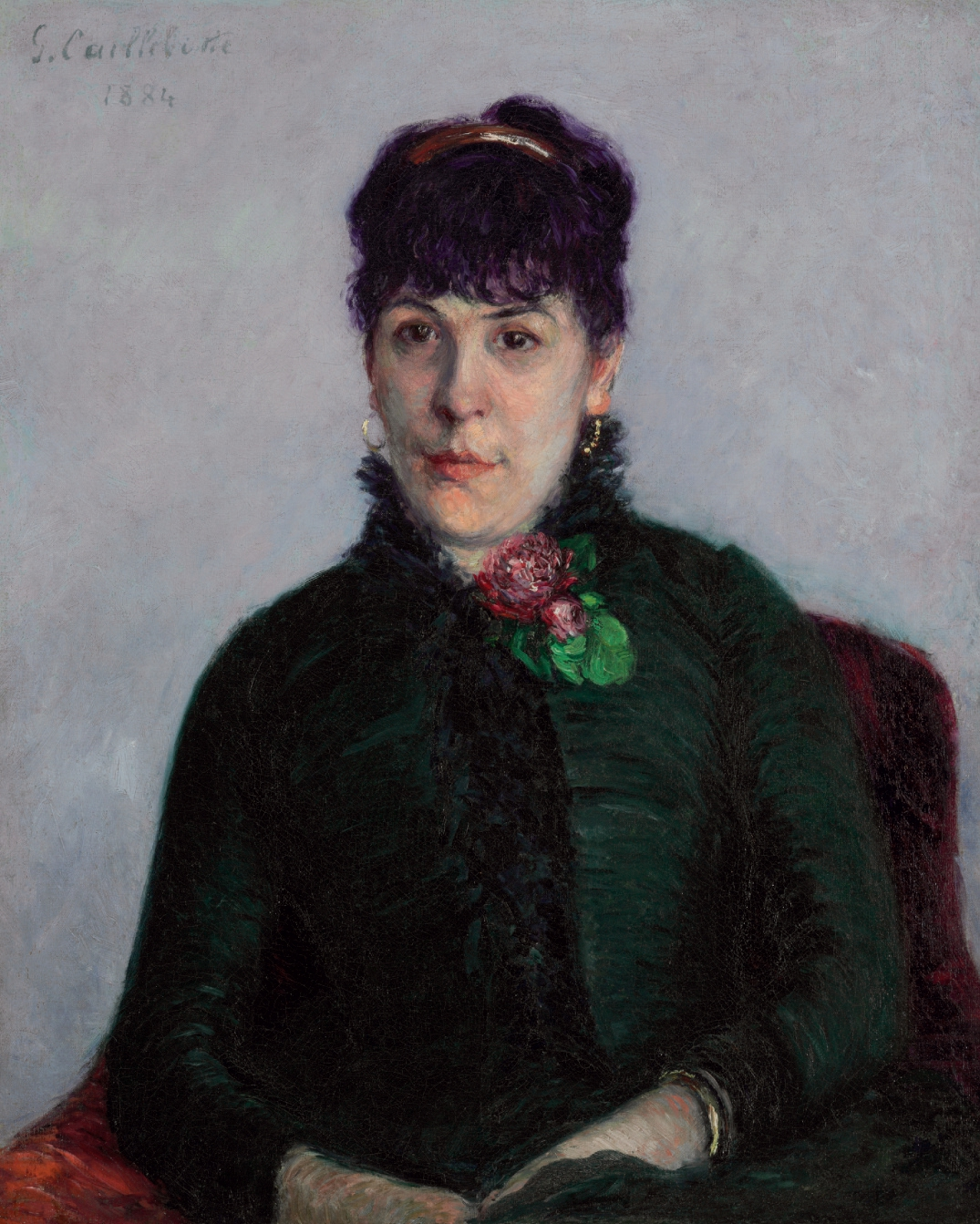
Gustave Caillebotte La femme à la rose

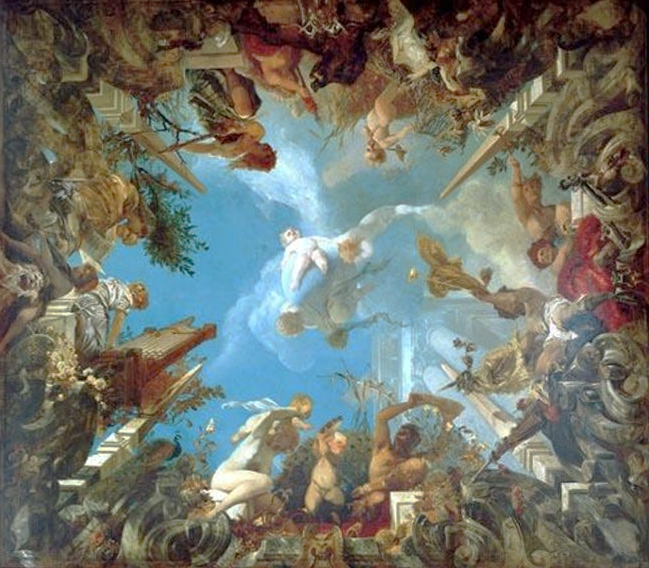
Hans Makart Four Allegories of Music (1871-1873)

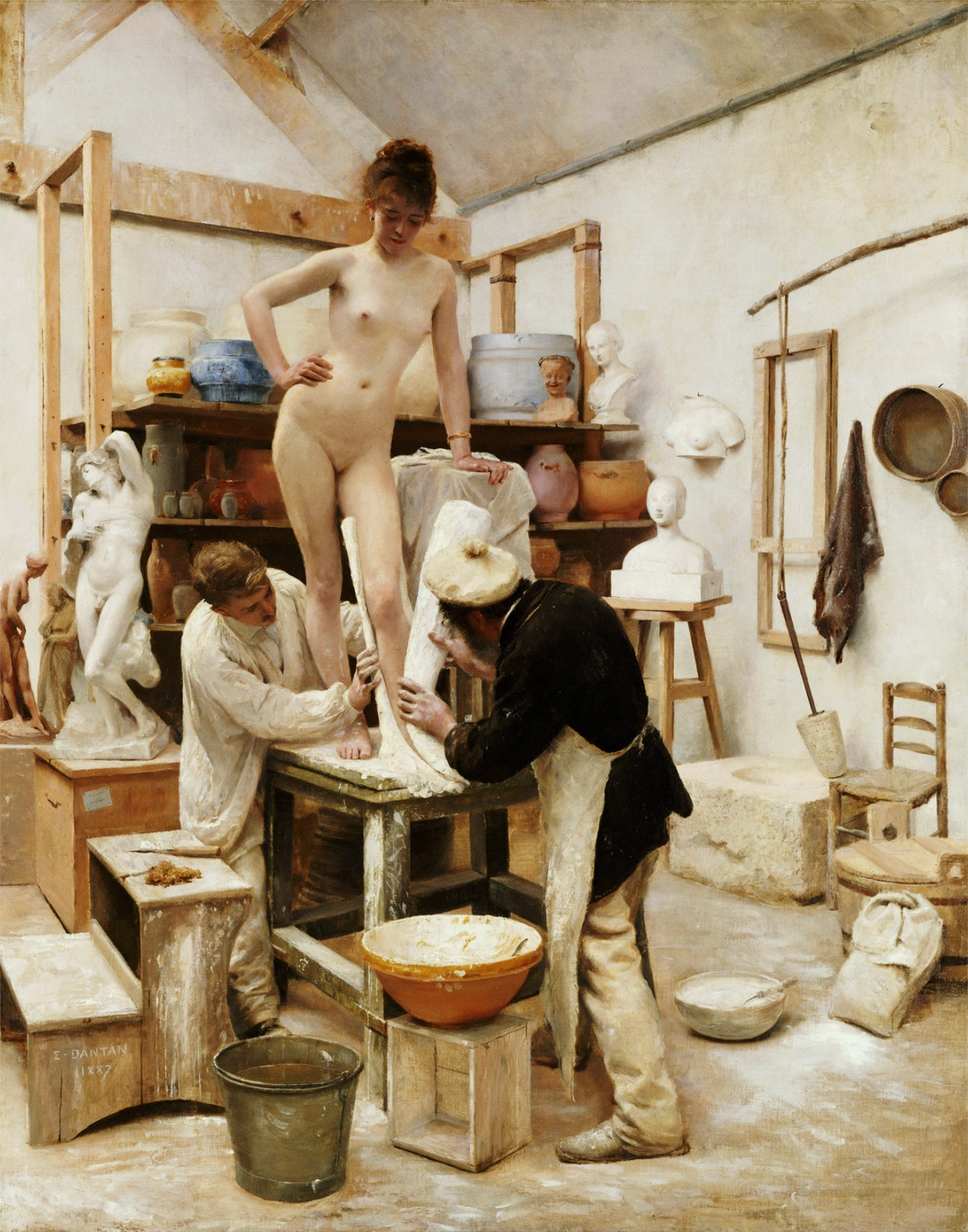
Édouard Joseph Dantan A Casting from Life

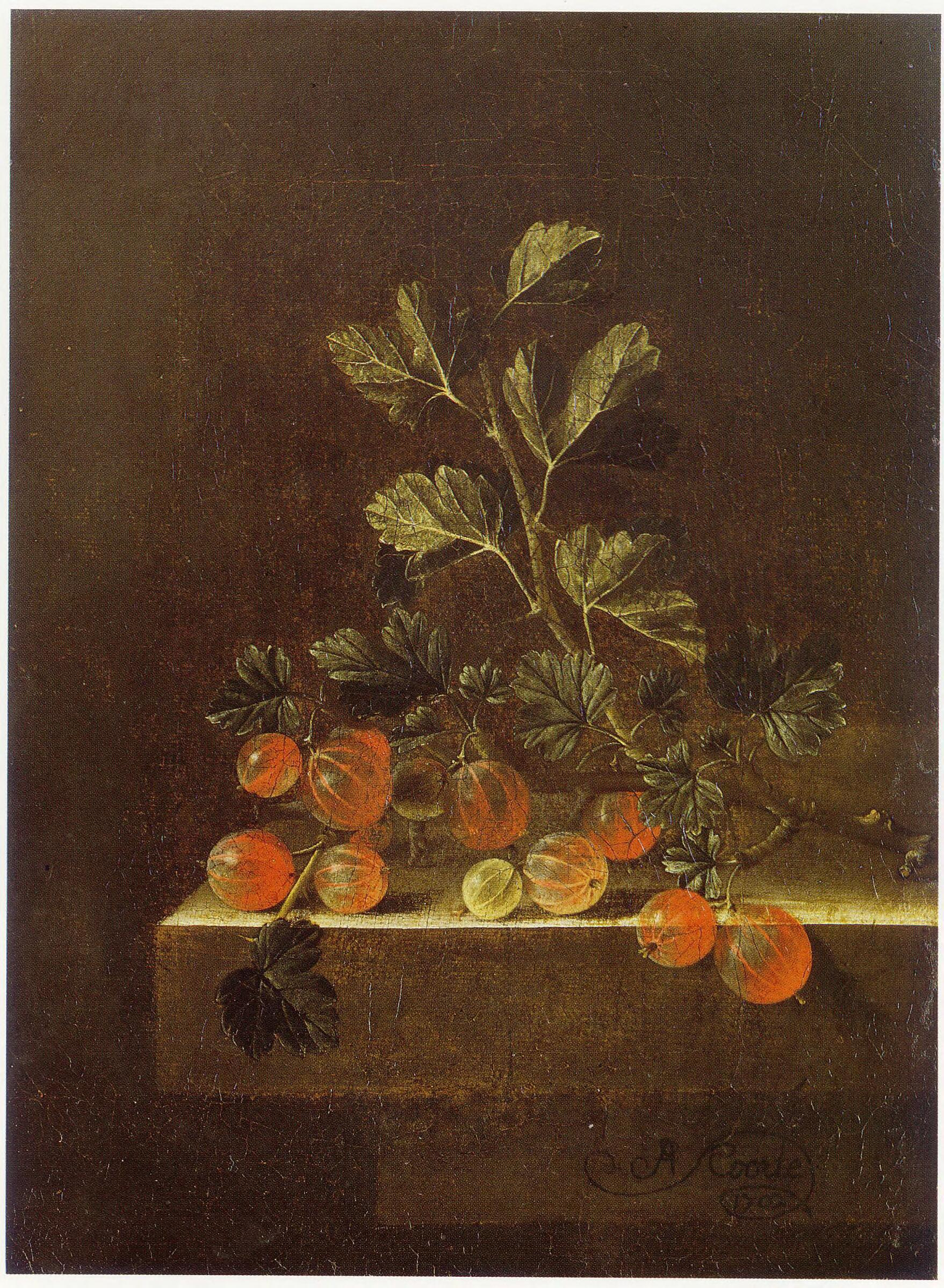
Adriaen Coorte Still life with a spray of gooseberries

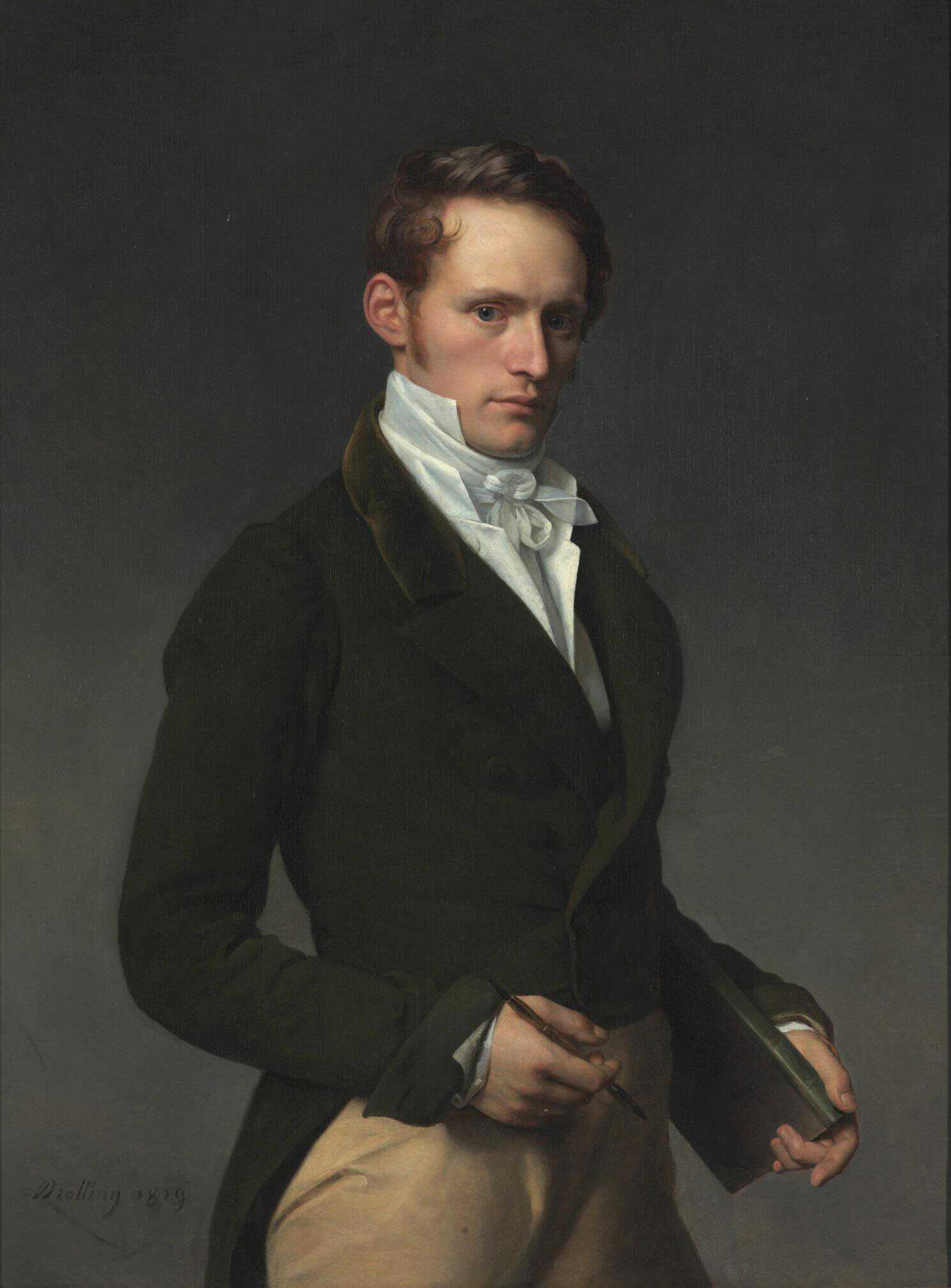
Michel Martin Drolling Portrait of the artist

== Reproductions from the museum ==
The museum has offered reproductions such as canvas posters, simulating sculptures made from bonded marble powder, stationery items and many classic CD recordings performed by top Taiwanese musicians on the rare instruments from the Chi Mei Collection since 1997. The museum has also published the hardcover book "Chi-Mei Collection of Fine Violins" featuring 15 world-famous string instruments made by the Italian violin makers of the 17th century. Through the Shining Collection in New York, one can inquire about and purchase these reproductions.

== Location and hours ==
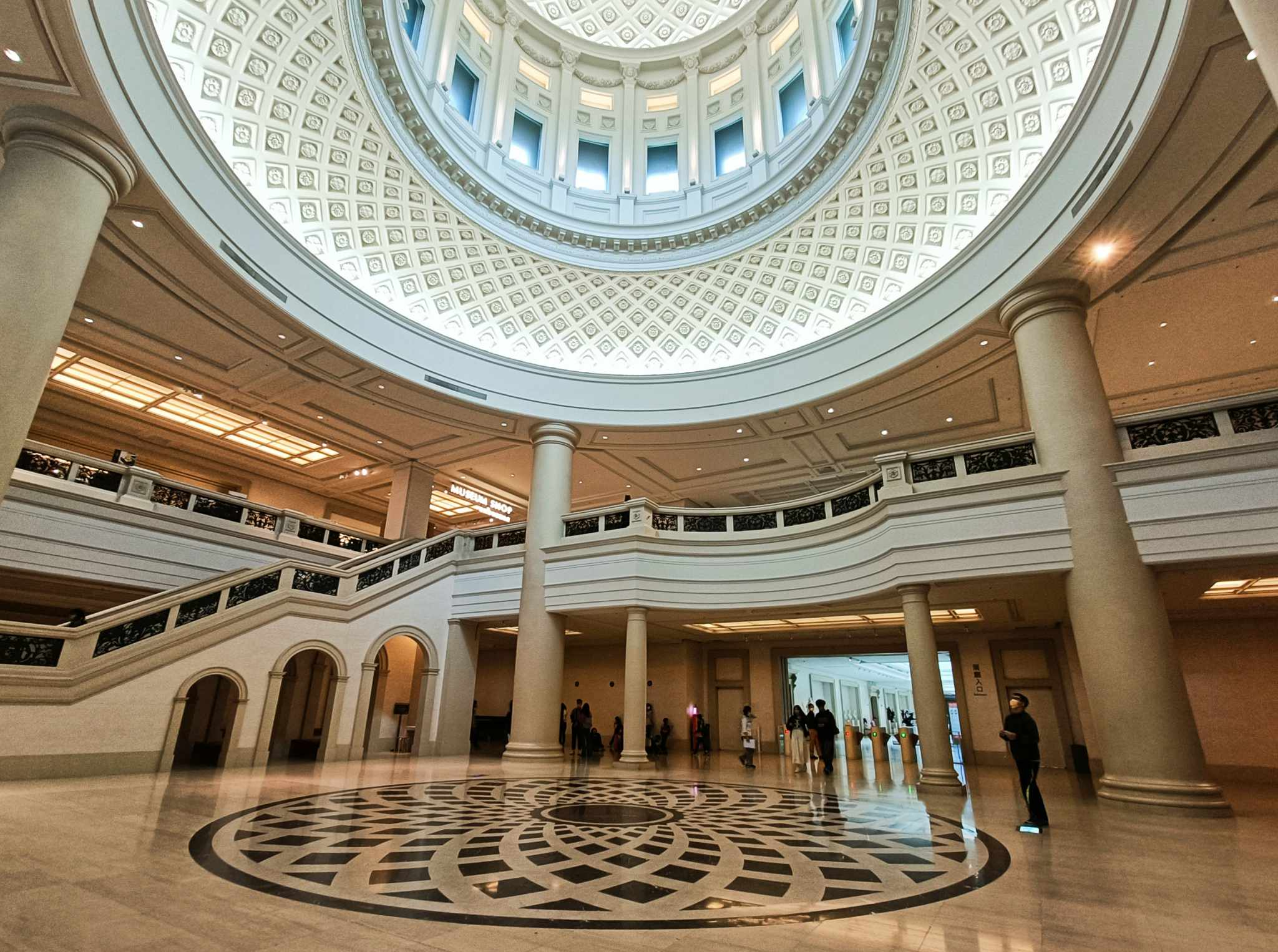
Museum entry hall

The museum address is: No. 66, Section 2, Wenhua Rd., Rende District, Tainan, Taiwan. The museum is open to the public from 9:30 am to 5:30 pm, and it is closed on Wednesdays and other designated days.

== Transportation ==
The museum is accessible within walking distance from Bao'an Station of Taiwan Railway.

== See also ==
- List of museums in Taiwan
- List of music museums
- List of largest art museums
