= Bao'an railway station =

Railway station in Rende, Tainan, Taiwan

Bao'an Station 保安車站
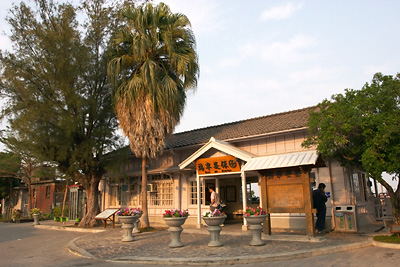

General information
- Location: Rende, Tainan, Taiwan
- Coordinates: 22°55′58.7″N 120°13′53.9″E
- Owner: Taiwan Railway Corporation
- Operator: Taiwan Railway Corporation
- Line: West Coast
- Train operators: Taiwan Railway Corporation

History
- Opened: 1899

Passengers
- 3,143 daily (2024)
Location

Bao'an (traditional Chinese: 保安車站; simplified Chinese: 保安车站; pinyin: Bǎo'ān Chēzhàn) is a railway station on Taiwan Railway (TR) West Coast line located in Rende District, Tainan, Taiwan.

== History ==
The station was opened 1899.

== Architecture ==
The station was constructed with Chinese Cypress architectural style.

== Around the station ==
- Chimei Museum
- Furniture Manufacturing Eco Museum in Tainan

== See also ==
- List of railway stations in Taiwan

Preceding station	Taiwan Railway	Following station
Tainan towards Keelung	Western Trunk line	Rende towards Pingtung
