= Yevgeniy Prokopov =

Ukrainian sculptor (born 1950)

- Євген Прокопов
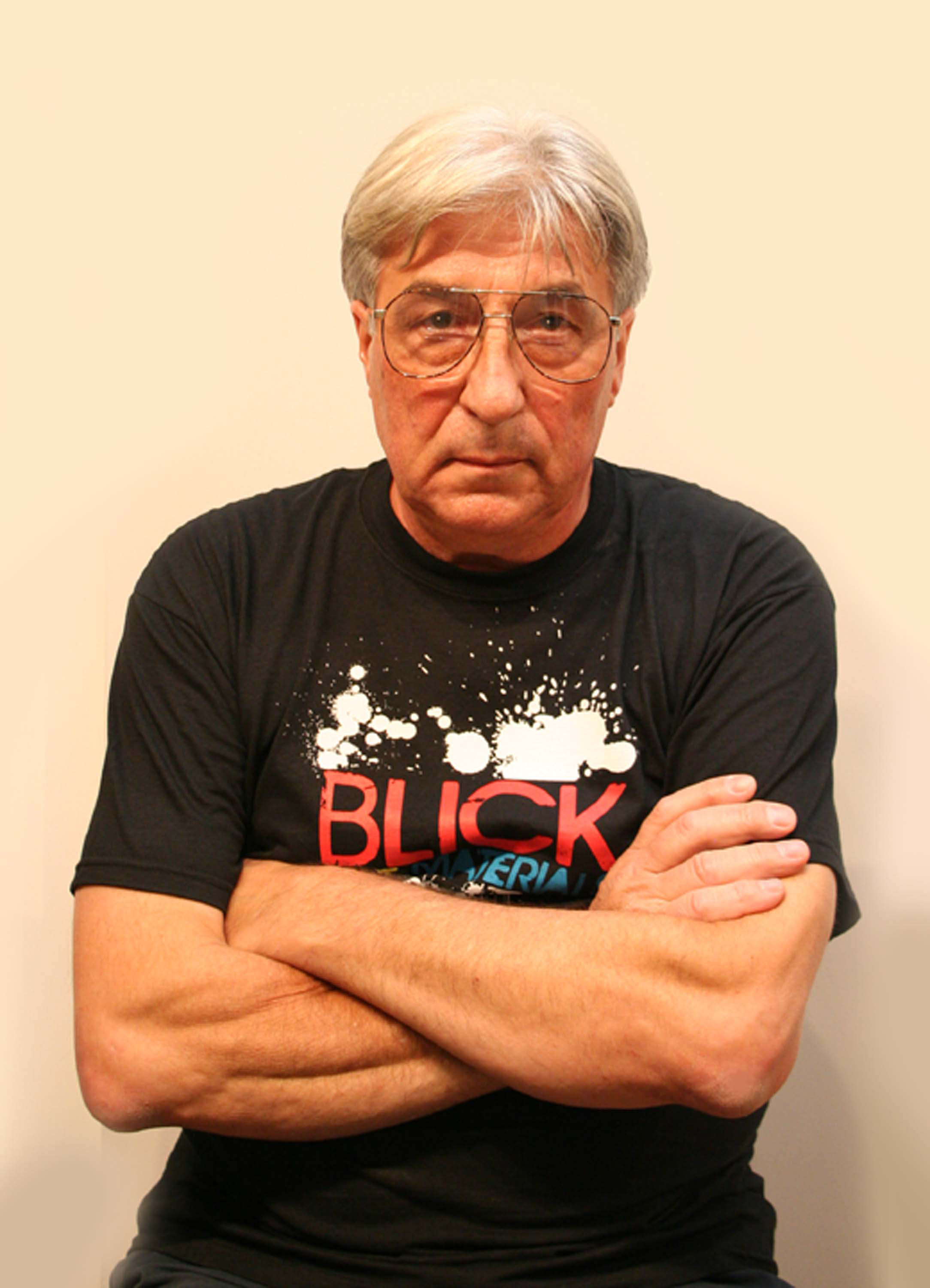
- Born: Yevgeniy Prokopov; 4 May 1950 (age 76); Kyiv, Ukrainian SSR, Soviet Union
- Education: National Academy of Visual Arts and Architecture in Kyiv, Ukraine and Academy of Arts of the Soviet Union, in Moscow, USSR.
- Known for: sculpture
- Movement: Bronze Sculpture, Contemporary Sculpture
- Awards: Honored Artist of Ukraine
- Website: prokopov.org

Yevgeniy Prokopov(Ukrainian: Євген Прокопов; born May 4, 1950, in Kyiv) is a Ukrainian sculptor known for his monumental works and contributions to contemporary sculpture. He has been honored with the title of Honored Artist of Ukraine and has exhibited his art internationally.

== Early life and education ==
Born in Kyiv, Ukraine, Prokopov was influenced by his father Yosyp Fedorovych Prokopov, a celebrated painter and World War II veteran, and his mother, Valentina Semenivna, a geologist who often took him on geological expeditions. He pursued his passion for art at the National Academy of Visual Arts and Architecture in Kyiv, where he studied sculpture. In 1980, he earned a PhD in visual arts from the Academy of Arts of the Soviet Union in Moscow.

== Career ==
Prokopov's career is marked by numerous exhibitions and public installations. His works have been displayed in over 30 museums and galleries worldwide, including:

- National Art Museum of Ukraine, ⁣ Kyiv, Ukraine

- Museum of Modern Art, Kyiv, Ukraine

- Ukrainian National Museum, ⁣ Chicago, Illinois

- Ukrainian Institute of Modern Art, Chicago, Illinois

- Museum of Biblical Art, Dallas, Texas

- Taras Shevchenko National Museum, Kyiv, Ukraine

- Ukrainian Institute of America, New York City

- Chimei Museum, Tainan, Taiwan

In 2004, his large bronze sculpture "Two Cyclists" (co-authored with Mykola Oliynyk) was sold at a Sotheby's auction.

His sculptures are also part of private collections in Ukraine, the United States, Israel, Germany, Denmark, and Switzerland.

In 1998, Prokopov relocated to the United States, initially residing in Chicago before moving to Florida, where he continues to live and work.

== Artistic style and techniques ==
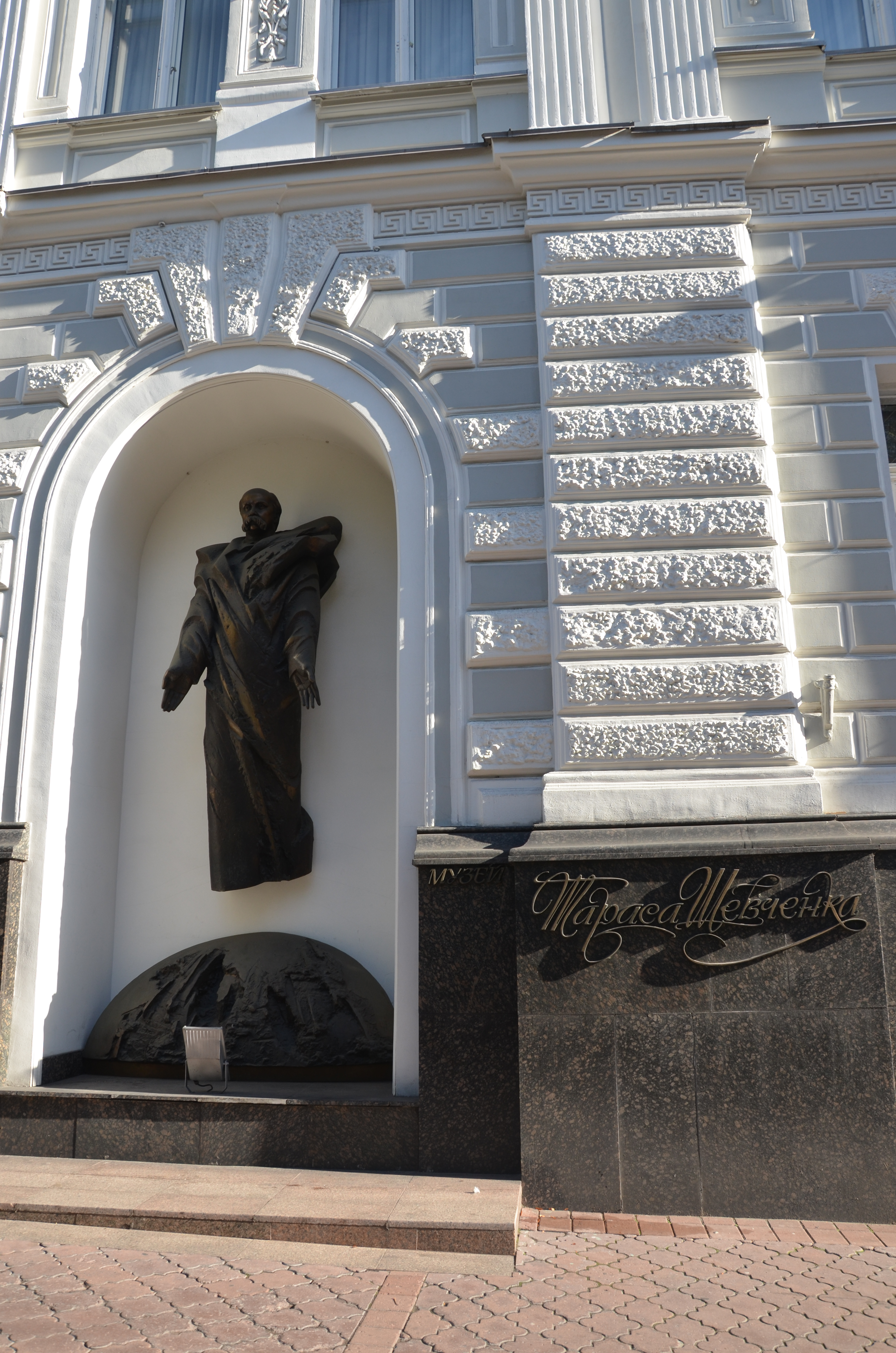

Yevgeniy Prokopov is known for his use of materials and distinctive artistic techniques. He was among the first sculptors to incorporate mirror-polished steel into his works, creating reflective surfaces that engage viewers uniquely. In his reliefs, he utilized galvanic copper plates to produce random effects, adding depth and texture to his compositions.

In his Biblical Cycle, Prokopov developed a unique method of integrating multiple layers of time within a single artwork, a concept that parallels the principles of Extended Reality (XR).

Early in his career, Prokopov focused on narrative compositions and portraits. However, in the 1990s, he transitioned towards meaningful metaphors and minimalist forms in his sculptures. His primary themes include philosophical reflections on human existence, the resilience of the human spirit, motherhood, love, and classical religious subjects.

Prokopov's works are characterized by:

- Maximizing Material Properties: He skillfully utilizes the inherent qualities of materials to enhance the visual and tactile experience of his sculptures.

- Emphasis on Surfaces: His attention to surface treatment adds depth and complexity to his pieces.

- Avant-garde Techniques: He employs fragmented forms and spatial pauses, allowing him to convey profound meanings through abstract symbolic shapes.

== Religious sculptures ==
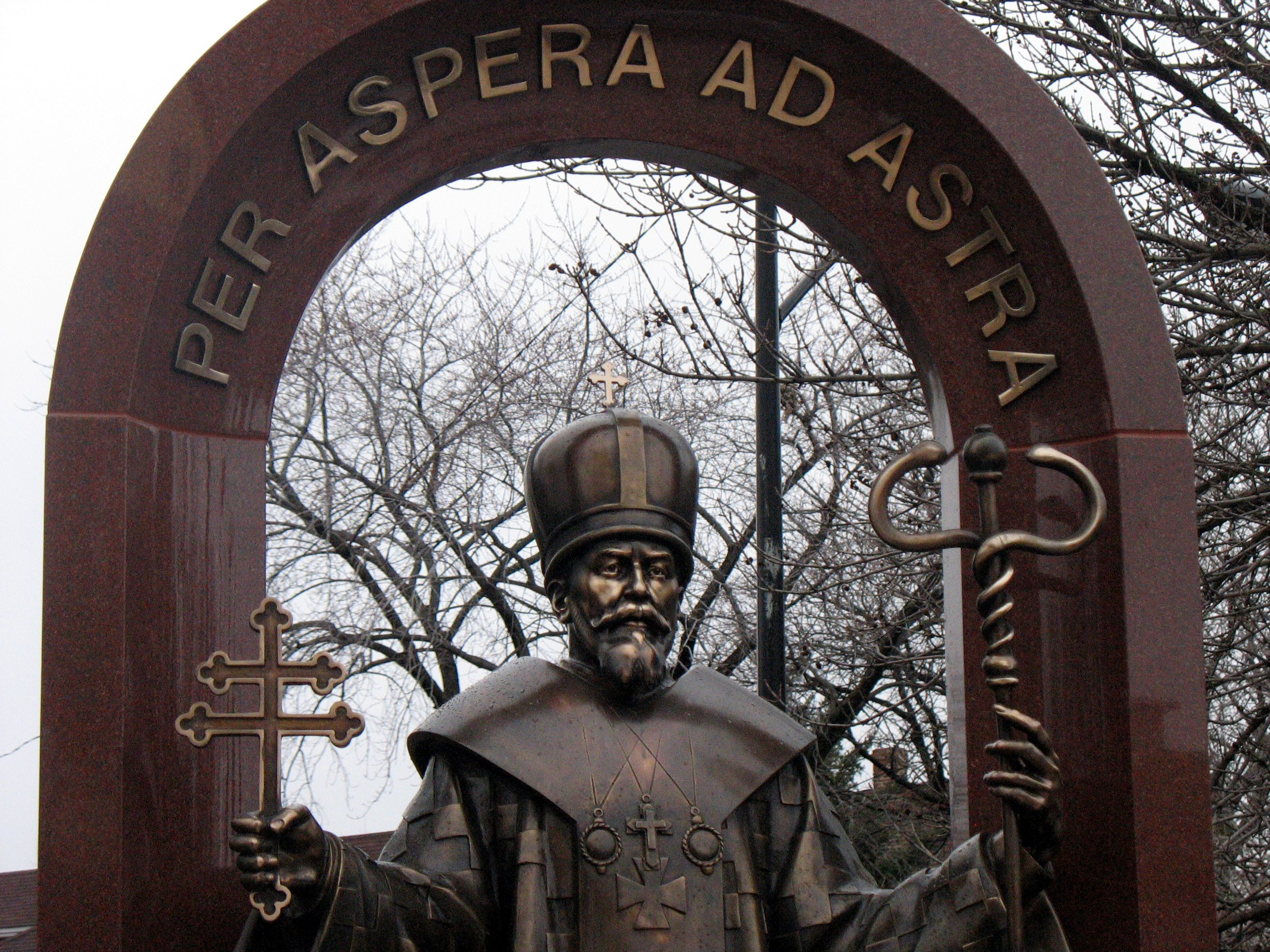

Prokopov religious works reflect the artist's profound spiritual and philosophical pursuits. In his creations, he combines traditional Christian themes with contemporary sculptural expression.

His art emphasizes universal values such as sacrifice, freedom of faith, maternal love, and the unity of humanity. Through a symbolic language of form and texture, Prokopov conveys a sacred meaning.

Yevgeniy Prokopov's religious sculptures show how contemporary art can embody and communicate eternal values. His works have found their place in various countries, highlighting their universal appeal and cultural importance.

== Notable works ==
Prokopov is acclaimed for his monumental sculptures, including:

- Monument to the Heavenly Hundred (Chicago): Located in Bloomingdale, Illinois, this piece commemorates those who lost their lives during the Euromaidan protests.

- Monument of Patriarch Josyf Cardinal Slipyj: Situated at Sts. Volodymyr & Olha Cathedral in Chicago, Illinois.

- Bronze group of Two Cyclists ("To Victory!"): Installed at Lite-On Corporation in Neihu, Taiwan.

- Two Cyclists (with Nikolay Oleynik): Displayed at the Chimei Museum, Tainan, Taiwan

- Sculptural composition of Prometheus: Displayed at the State Museum of Taras Shevchenko in Kyiv, Ukraine.

- Sculptural composition of Memory (Memorial to Victims of Persecution for their Faith in Christ): Located at St. Michael's Golden-Domed Monastery in Kyiv, Ukraine.

- Memorial statue of Mykola Lukash: Kyiv, Ukraine.

- Memorial statue of Oles Honchar: Kyiv, Ukraine.

- Sculptural composition of Pietà: Ternopil, Ukraine.

- Sculptural composition of Unity of Faith: Evangelist-Lutheran Church, Reinhardsdorf, Germany.

- Sculptural composition of Reincarnation: St. Nicholas Church, Kyiv, Ukraine.

- Sculptural composition of Pokrova: Podil district, Kyiv, Ukraine.

- Statue Ukraine-Motherland: Rivne, Ukraine.

- Statue of Students and Professors of the Kyiv State University: Kyiv, Ukraine.

- Composition "Annunciation": Geneva, Switzerland.

- Composition "Red Square" ("Industrial Storm"): Andres Institute of Art, Sculpture Park, Brookline, New Hampshire, USA.

== Awards and honors ==
Throughout his career, Prokopov has received several accolades, including:

- Honored Artist of Ukraine: Awarded in 1998 by the National Ukrainian Government. - Edouard and Maurice Sandoz Foundation Award: Received in 1997.

He has also been recognized with numerous prizes for his participation in international sculptural symposiums.

== Professional affiliations ==
- National Union of Artists of Ukraine member since 1978.
- International Sculpture Center member since 2022.

== Gallery ==
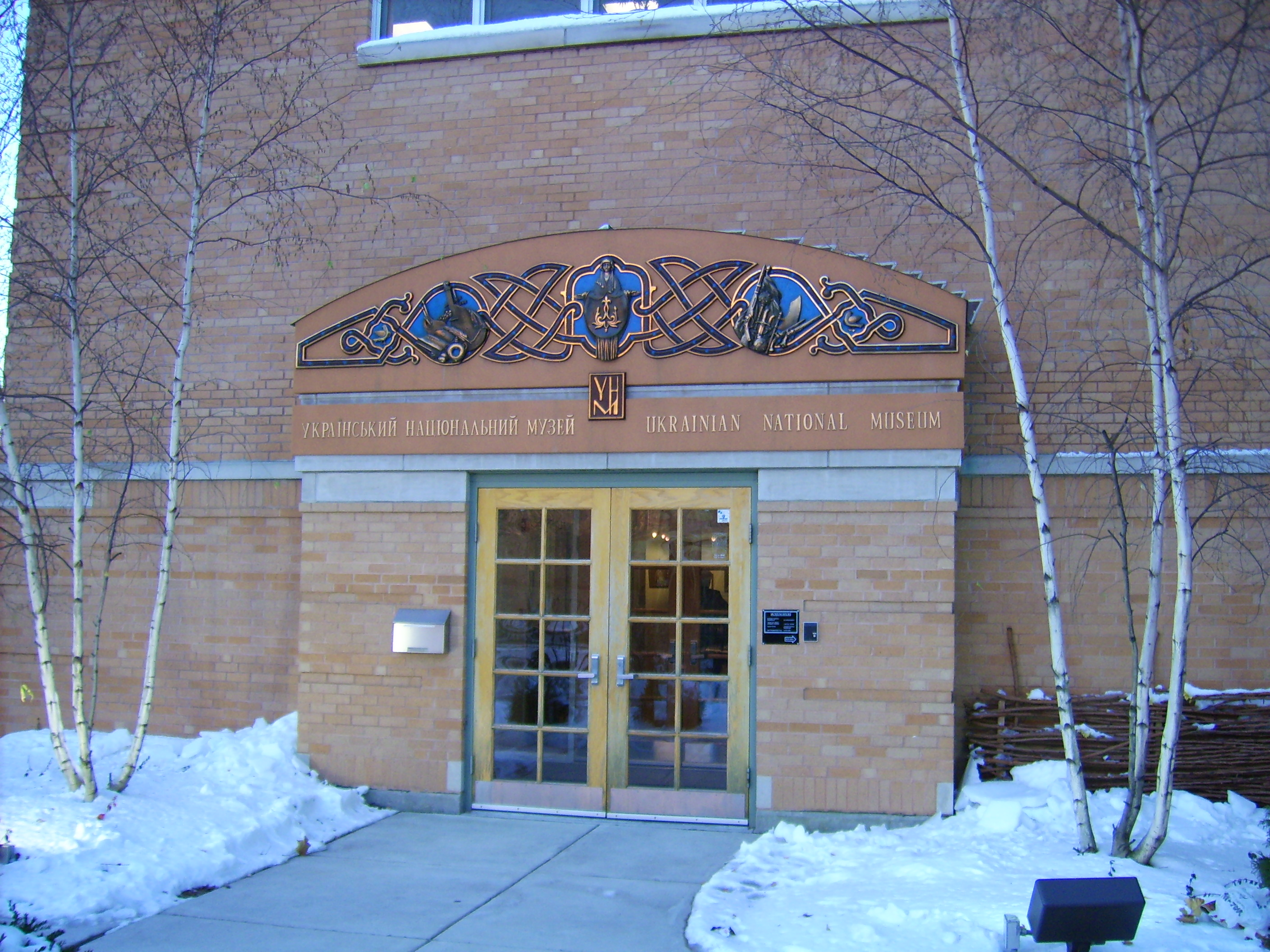
The Ukrainian National Museum featuring a bronze relief over the entrance.

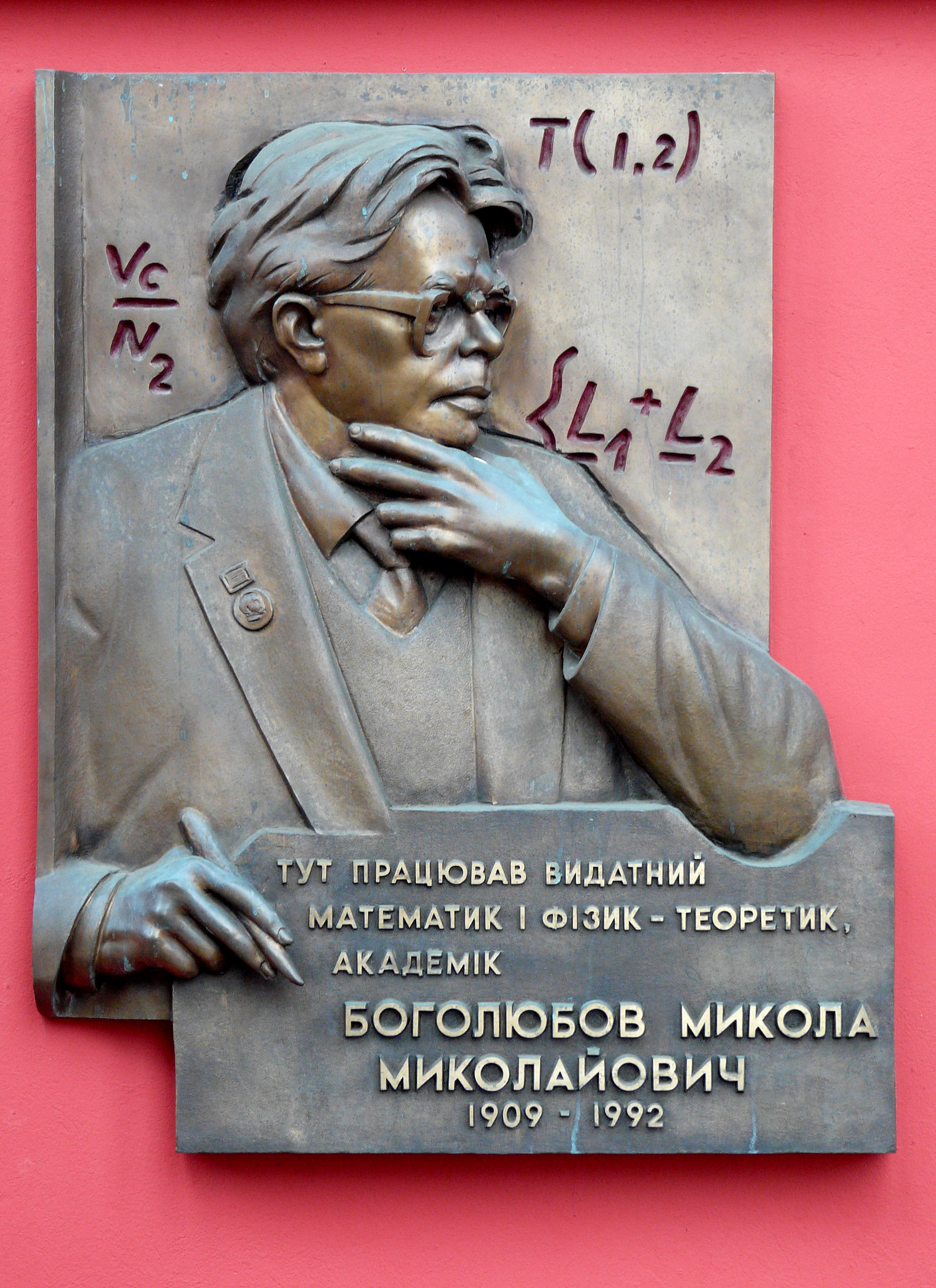

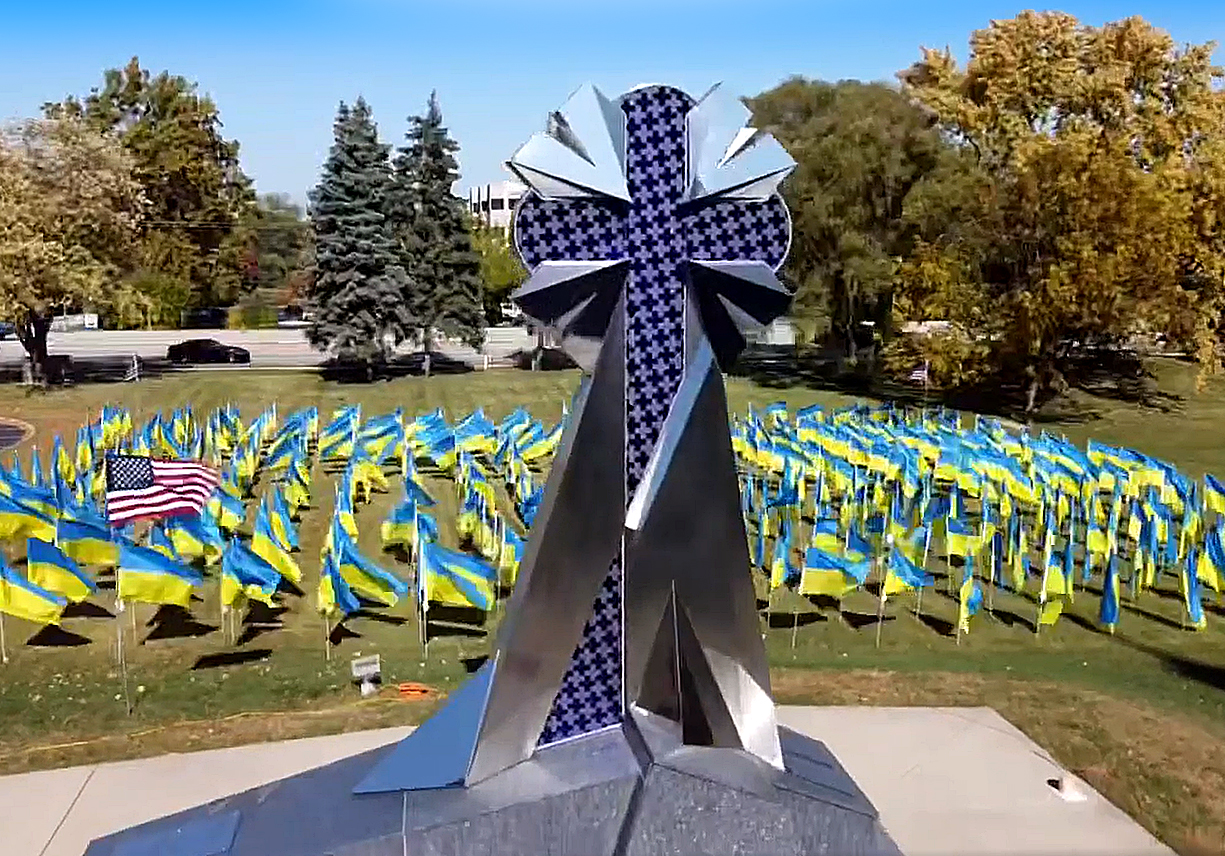

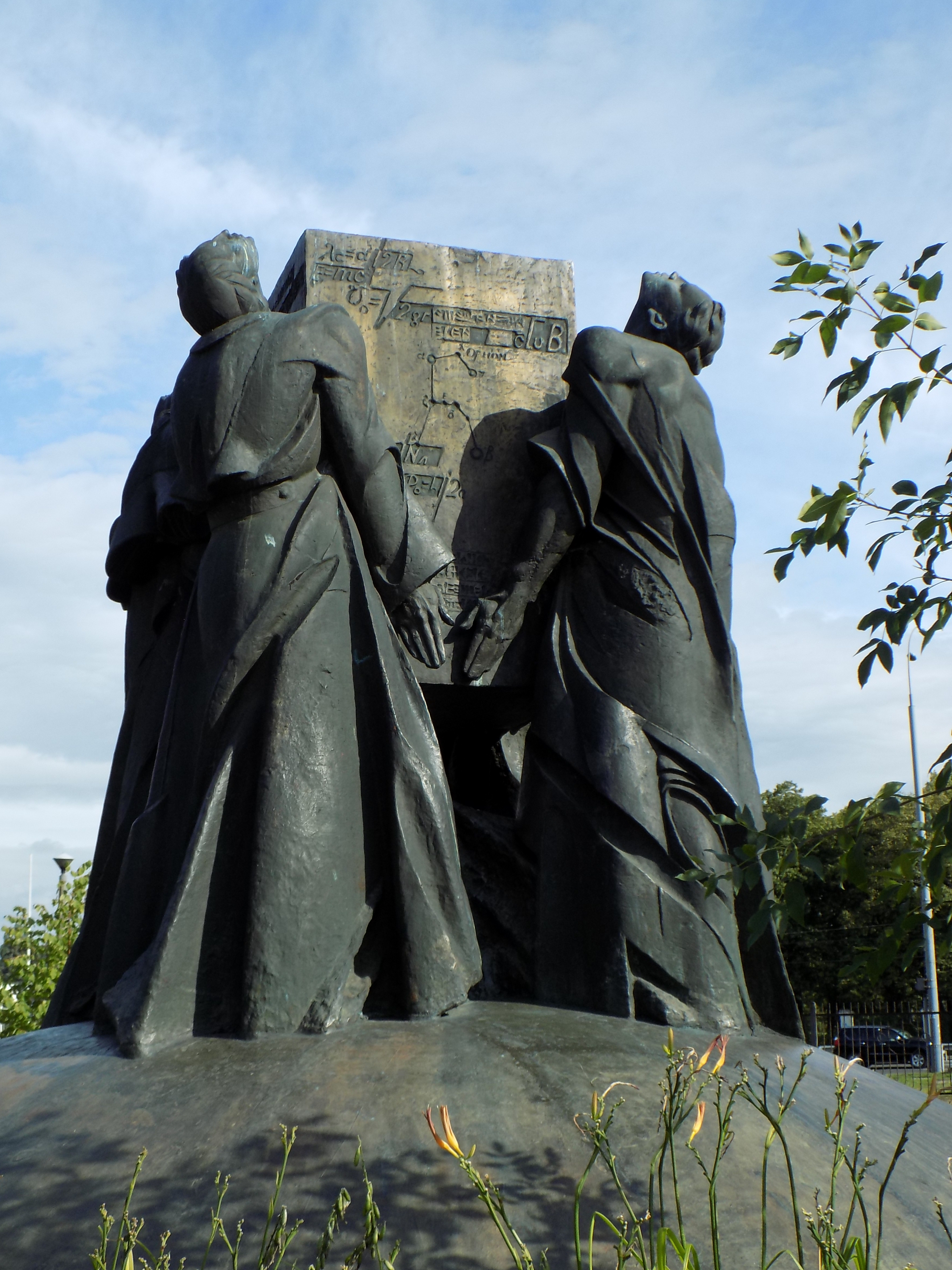

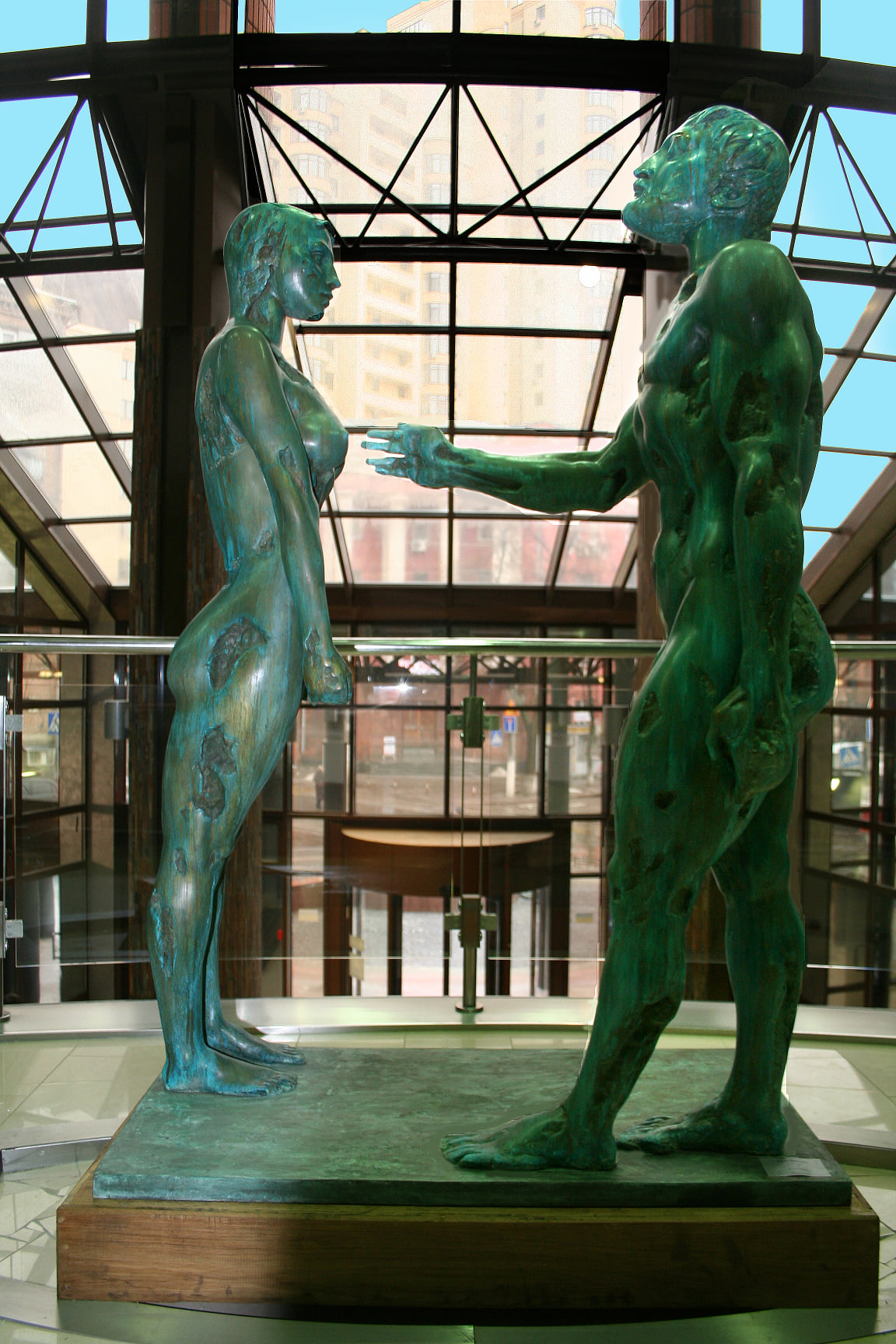
