= Chung Hwa University of Medical Technology =

Private university in Rende, Tainan, Taiwan

- 中華醫事科技大學
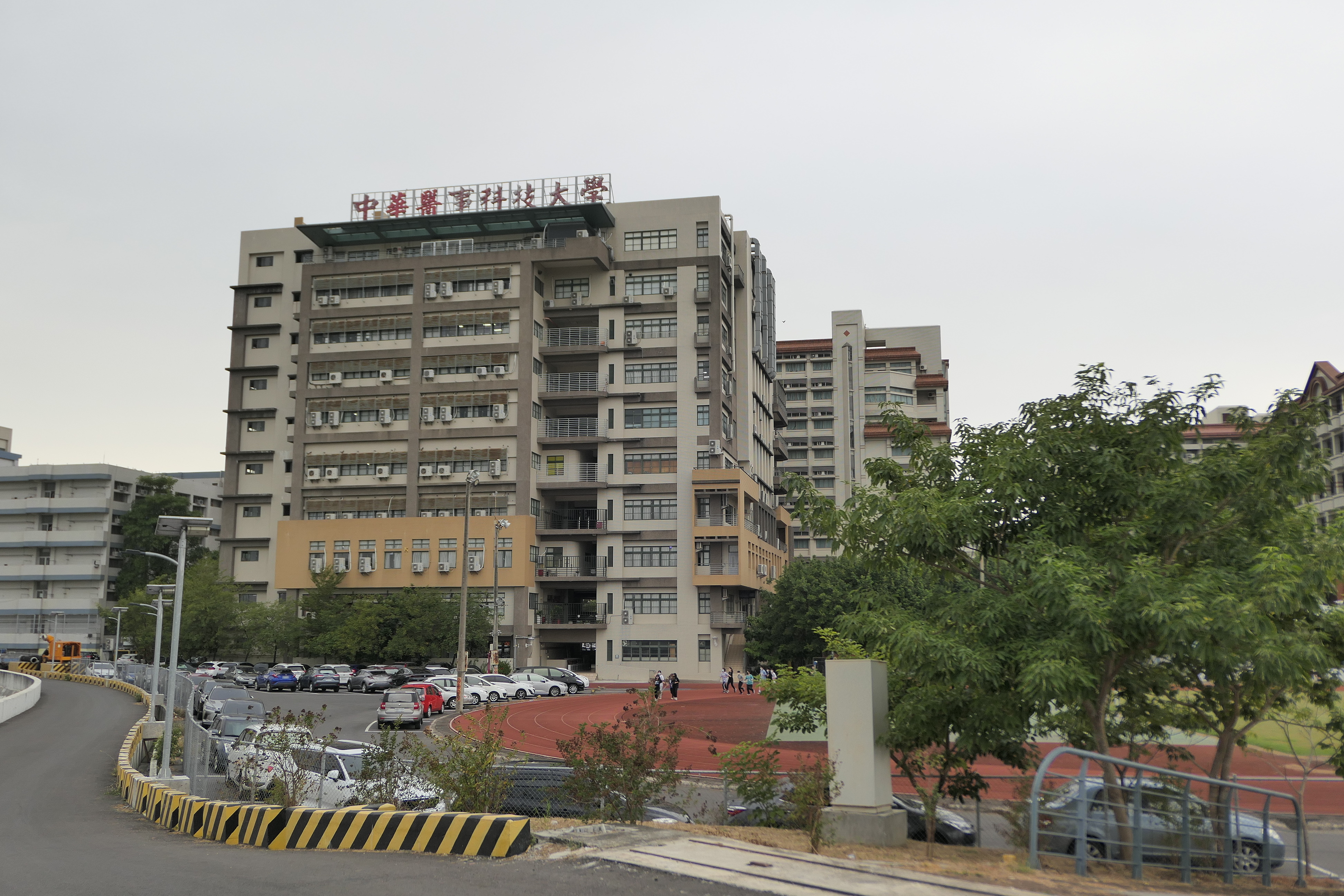
- Type: private university
- Established: 1968 (as China Junior College of Medical Technology); 2007 (as CUMT)
- Location: Rende, Tainan, Taiwan; 22°57′39.5″N 120°14′39.9″E
- Website: Official website

Chung Hwa University of Medical Technology
- Traditional Chinese: 中華醫事科技大學
- Simplified Chinese: 中华医事科技大学
Transcriptions
Standard Mandarin
- Hanyu Pinyin: Zhōnghuá Yīshì Kējì Dàxué
Southern Min
- Hokkien POJ: Tiong-hôa I-sū Kho-ki Tāi-ha̍k

The Chung Hwa University of Medical Technology (CUMT; Chinese: 中華醫事科技大學; Pe̍h-ōe-jī: Tiong-hôa I-sū Kho-ki Tāi-ha̍k) is a private university in Rende District, Tainan, Taiwan.

The university offers undergraduate programs in medical technology, nursing, physical therapy, occupational therapy, medical imaging and radiological sciences, and health care administration.

CHUMT also offers a number of graduate programs, including a Master of Science in Medical Laboratory Science, a Master of Science in Nursing, a Master of Science in Rehabilitation Sciences, and a Master of Science in Health Care Management.

The university is also known for its research programs, particularly in the areas of medical technology and allied health sciences.

== History ==
The university was originally established in 1968 as China Junior College of Medical Technology. In 1999, the school was upgraded to Chung Hwa College of Medical Technology. On 1 February 2007, the college was upgraded to Chung Hwa University of Medical Technology.

== Faculties ==
- College of Health Care and Management
- College of Human Science and Technology
- College of Medicine and Life Science

== See also ==
- List of universities in Taiwan
