= Rende District =

District in Tainan, Taiwan

Coordinates: 22°58′N 120°15′E

Rende 仁德區
- District
- Rende District
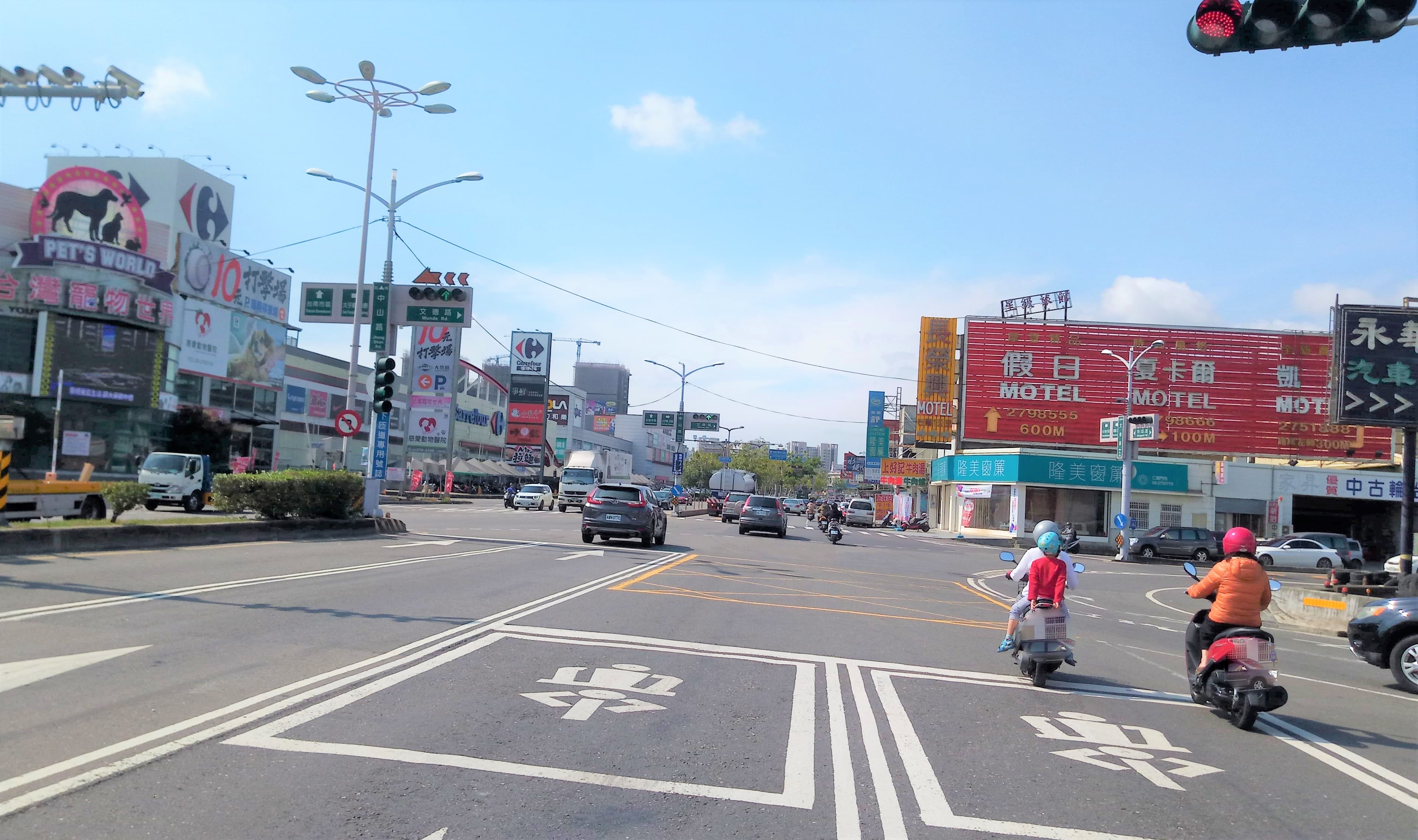

- Rende District in Tainan City
- Location: Tainan, Taiwan

Area
  - Total: 51 km^{2} (20 sq mi)

Population (January 2023)
  - Total: 76,983
  - Density: 1,500/km^{2} (3,900/sq mi)
- Website: www.rende.gov.tw (in Chinese)

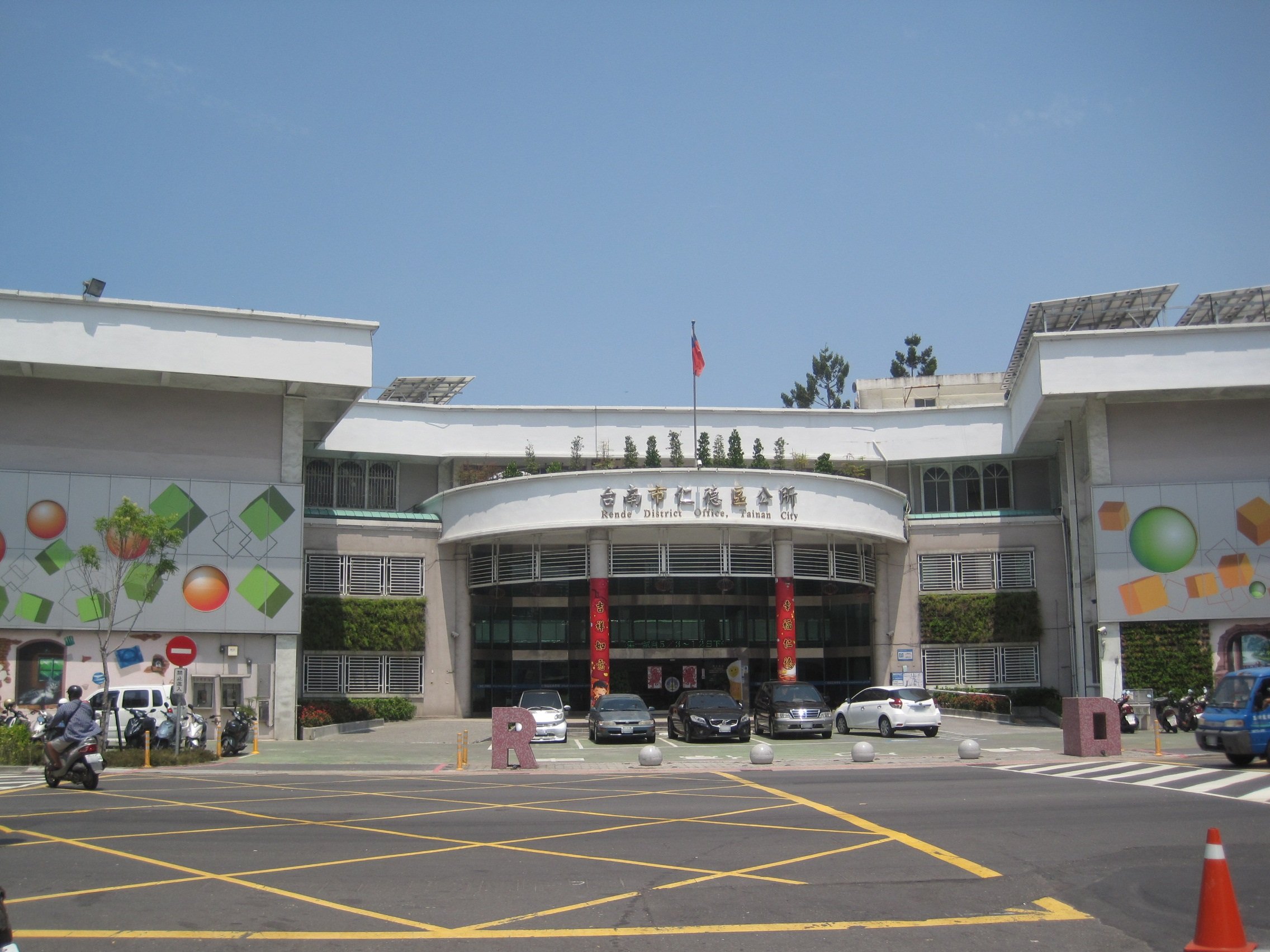
Rende District office

Rende District (Chinese: 仁德區; pinyin: Réndé Qū; Wade–Giles: Jen^{2}-te^{2} Ch'ü^{1}; Pe̍h-ōe-jī: Jîn-tek-khu) is a rural district in southern Tainan, Taiwan.

== History ==
After the handover of Taiwan from Japan to the Republic of China in 1945, Rende was organized as a rural township of Tainan County. On 25 December 2010, Tainan County was merged with Tainan City and Rende was upgraded to a district of the city.

== Geography ==
- Area: 50.77 km^{2}
- Population: 76,983 people (January 2023)

== Administrative divisions ==
The district consists of Taizi, Tuku, Yijia, Rende, Renyi, Xintian, Houbi, Shanglun, Baoan, Chenggong, Renhe, Renai, Erhang, Dajia, Zhongzhou, Wenxian Village.

== Education ==
- Chia Nan University of Pharmacy and Science
- Chung Hwa University of Medical Technology

== Hospitals ==
- Chest Hospital
- Jianan Psychiatric Center

== Tourist attractions ==
- Chimei Museum
- Furniture Manufacturing Eco Museum in Tainan
- Hushan Park
- Taiwan Holocaust Museum

== Transportation ==
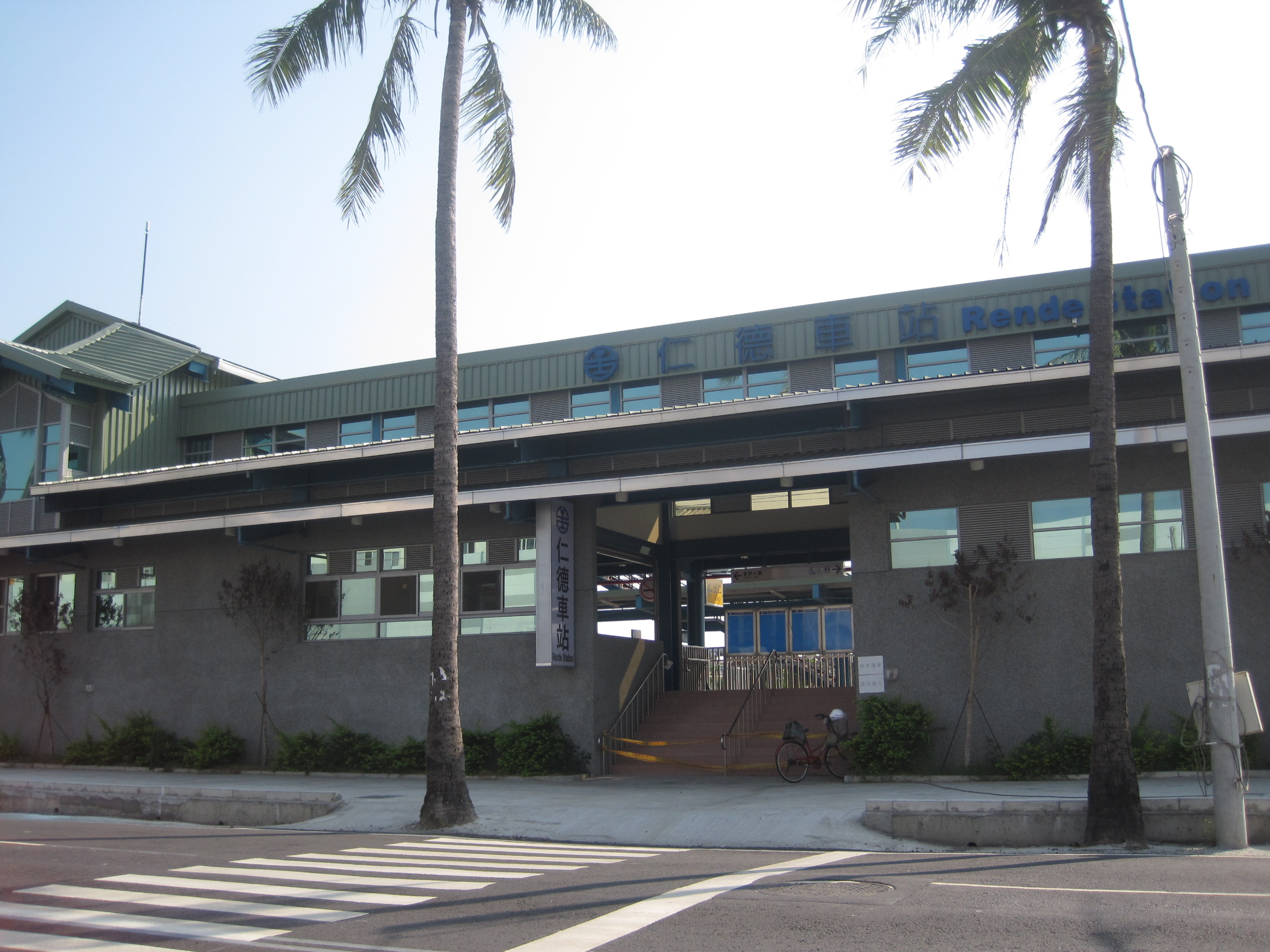
Rende Station

=== Rail ===
- Bao'an Station
- Rende Station
- Zhongzhou Station

=== Road ===
- National Highway 1
- Provincial Highway 1
- Provincial Highway 86
