= Northumberland Street (disambiguation) =

Northumberland Street is a street in Newcastle upon Tyne, England.

Northumberland Street may also refer to:

- Northumberland Street, London, London
- Luxborough Street, formerly Northumberland Street, London

== See also ==
- Northumberland Avenue, London
