= College of Optometrists =

UK professional body

Coordinates: 51.507865°N 0.125428°W

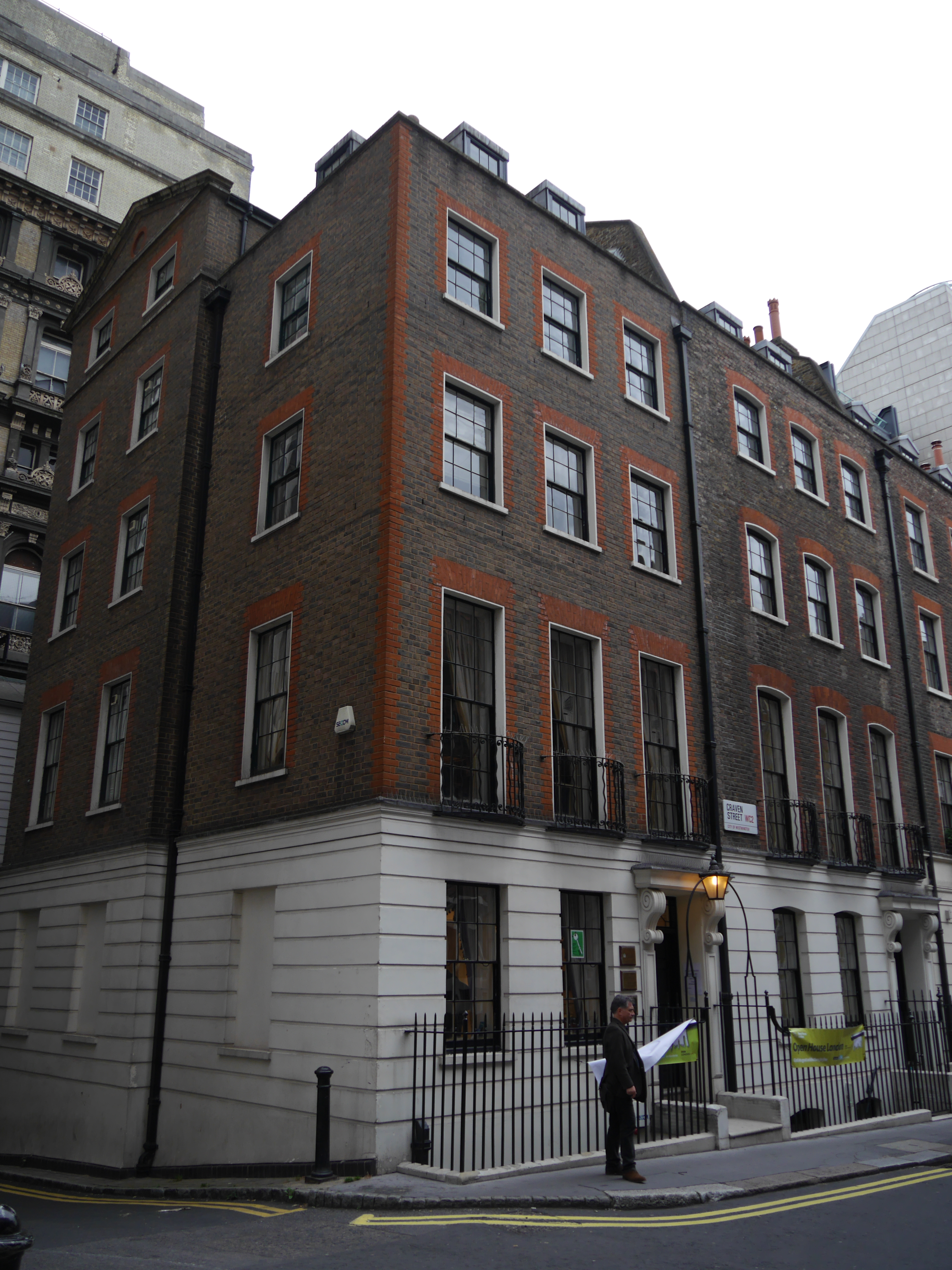
College of Optometrists, London

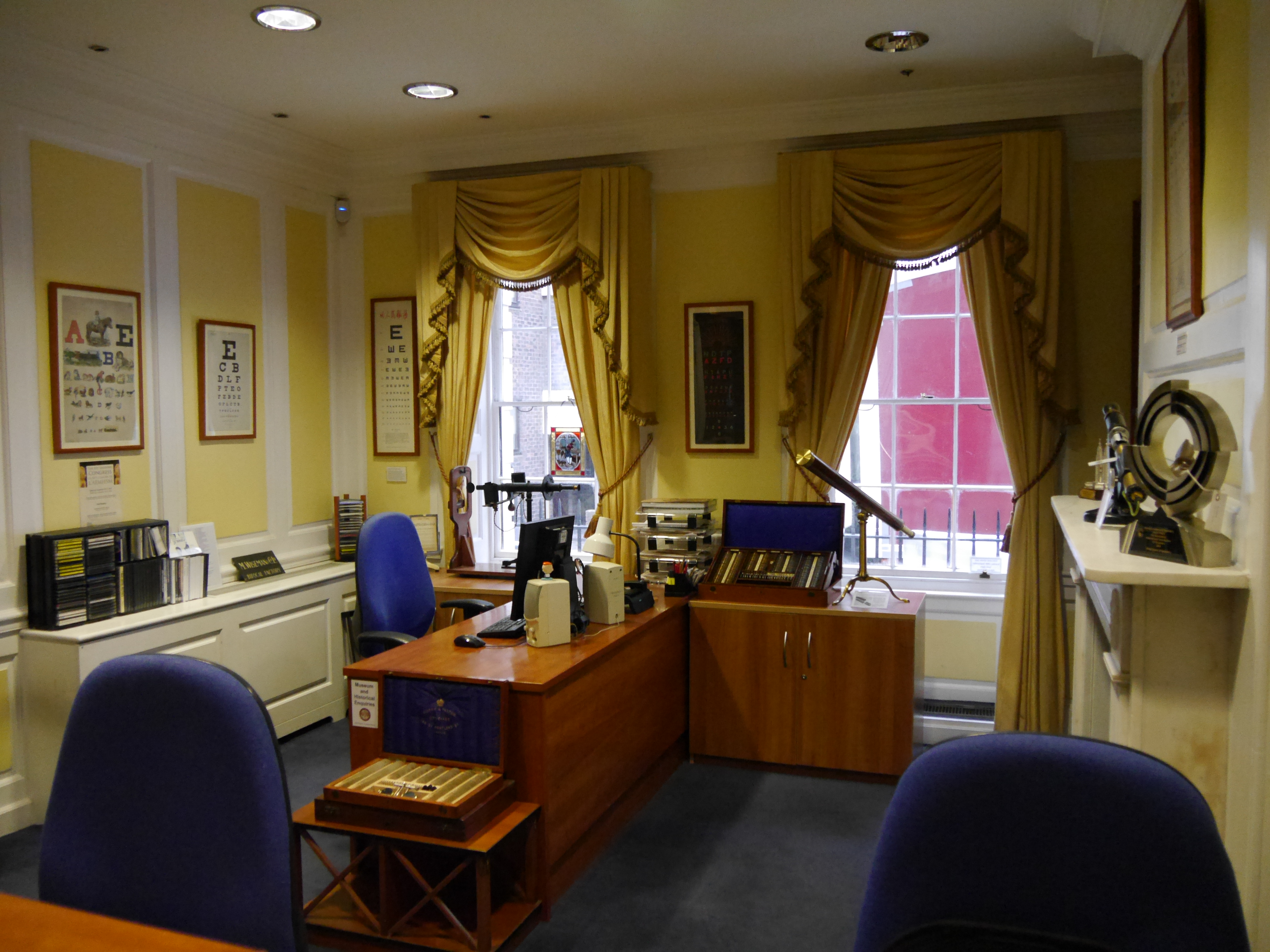
Library, College of Optometrists, London

The College of Optometrists is the professional, scientific and examining body for optometry in the United Kingdom, working for the public benefit. Their headquarters is at 41-42 Craven Street, London WC2, of which no 41 is a Grade II listed building.

== History ==
After the establishment of the British Optical Association (BOA) in 1895, several more professional bodies were formed for the development of British optometry, with at least six separate qualifying associations existing in the period prior to the passing of the Opticians Act (1958). By that year only four were authorised to conduct examinations and award professional qualifications statutorily approved by the General Optical Council (GOC). In 1962 the Institute of Optical Science (tracing its history, via predecessor bodies to 1905) merged with the BOA, leaving only three approved professional bodies. The creation of a single new professional body in the form of a royal college for optometrists was suggested in 1972 in a letter published by Rishi Agarwal.

The college was established in 1980 by three separate bodies, the former British Optical Association founded in 1895 and the Scottish Association of Opticians tracing its history to 1922 (both of which were disbanded in 1980) and the Worshipful Company of Spectacle Makers (incorporated by a Royal Charter in 1629 during the reign of King Charles I) which had run qualifying exams since 1898 but surrendered its examining function to the new college. In 1980 the title British College of Ophthalmic Opticians (Optometrists) was adopted. In 1987 the title was changed to British College of Optometrists and in 1995 the title College of Optometrists was adopted.

== Royal charter ==
The College of Optometrists was granted a royal charter by Queen Elizabeth II on 18 September 1995. This was celebrated at Guildhall on 25 January 1996 and attended by the Duchess of Gloucester and members of the college and guests.

== Location ==
Shortly before its formal foundation, the college was based at 10 Knaresborough Place in Earls Court, London in a town house purchased for it by the British Optical Association. The college moved to its current headquarters at 41-42 Craven Street in December 1997. The premises comprise two former townhouses, originally built in the 1730s, but with later additions. These were originally mid-terrace properties but following demolitions in the 1970s they now represent the end of the Georgian block on the east side of the street. It has transpired that one of houses (no 41) accommodated a business selling telescopes and optical 'toys' in the 1820s.

== Secretariat ==
The college is also the registered office of the European Academy of Optometry and Optics (EAOO), a membership organisation for the development of optometry and optics in Europe. It previously provided the secretariat for the EAOO from 2008 to 2017. The college also provided the secretariat for the World Council of Optometry (WCO) from 2008 to 2015. The college museum includes an archive of the history of the WCO and its predecessor international bodies, the IOL (1927–1969) and the IOOL (1969–1995).
