= Henry W. Hofstetter =

American optometrist (1914–2002)

Henry Hofstetter
- Born: September 12, 1914
- Died: May 10, 2002 (aged 87); Bloomington, Indiana
- Education: Ohio State University; Western Reserve University; Kent State University
- Spouse: Frances Jane Elder
- Scientific career
- Fields: Optometry
- Workplaces: National Academy of Sciences; United States Public Health Service; US Air Force; National Science Foundation

Henry W. Hofstetter (September 10, 1914 – May 10, 2002) was an American optometrist and the author of two books and 500 research papers. He is a past president of the American Optometric Association and a member of the National Optometry Hall of Fame.

== Early life ==
Hofstetter was born on September 10, 1914, the eighth of 11 children born to Swiss and German immigrants. His father, Kaspar Hofstetter, was a farmer from Switzerland while his mother Augusta Kresin Hofstetter was from West Prussia. He grew up on a farm in Huntsburg, Ohio, with three brothers and seven sisters. For two years, he attended Western Reserve University and went to Kent State University during the summer, where he got a teacher's certificate.

== Career ==
For two years, he taught all eight grades in a one room schoolhouse and worked as a janitor in Middlefield, Ohio. Influenced by his sister's husband, he decided to become an optometrist and was granted a bachelor's degree in optometry by Ohio State University in 1939. He obtained his master's degree in 1940, and a PhD in physiological optics, the first such degree ever issued by an optometry school, in 1942. On July 5, 1941, he married Frances Jane Elder.

Hofstetter was an instructor and associate professor at Ohio State until December 1948, when he moved his family to Los Angeles to take the position of dean of the Los Angeles College of Optometry effective January 1949. In 1952, Hofstetter arrived at Indiana University to assume the directorship of the newly created Division of Optometry. He held this post until 1970, when he resigned from his administrative duties. Hofstetter remained an active member of the faculty, receiving the Rudy Professorship in 1974. He retired from his academic position in 1979 and was awarded the title of Rudy Professor Emeritus by the Board of Trustees.

Hofstetter authored two books and more than 500 articles.

== Retirement and death ==
In 1980, Hofstetter decided to retire from full-time work, but continued to advise 15 master's and 11 Ph.D. students. In 1960, he published a book called the Dictionary of Visual Science which he helped revise four times, the last as the Dictionary of Visual Science and Related Clinical Terms in 2000, the fifth edition. He was a member of the Optometric Historical Society for 30 years, ending as its president, and served as president of both the American Optometric Association and the Association of Schools and Colleges of Optometry. He also worked as a consultant for the National Academy of Sciences, the United States Public Health Service, the US Air Force, and the National Science Foundation. He died on May 10, 2002, in Bloomington, Indiana, and was survived by his two daughters, Ann Delaney and Susan Mohme. His wife, Jane, died in October 1994.

== Awards ==
Hofstetter was awarded several honorary degrees including an O.D. from the Los Angeles College of Optometry in 1954. In 1991, Hofstetter was awarded the International Optometrist of the Year award by the International Optometric and Optical League. He was given Distinguished Service Awards by the World Council of Optometry, the American Optometric Association and the Indiana Optometric Association. He also received both the Prentice Medal and the Orion Award. He is a member of the National Optometry Hall of Fame.

Two awards from the Indiana chapter of the American Council of the Blind are named for Hofstetter. The Hank Hofstetter Opportunity Grant assists blind individuals, while the Hofstetter Award recognizes outstanding contributions to blind citizens in the state.
