= Borish =

Borish is a surname. Notable people with the surname include:

- Irvin Borish (1913–2012), American optometrist
- Matthew Borish (born 1991), American actor in Hack
- Peter Borish (fl. 1981), American investor
