= British Optical Association =

UK organisation

Coordinates: 51.5078°N 0.1254°W

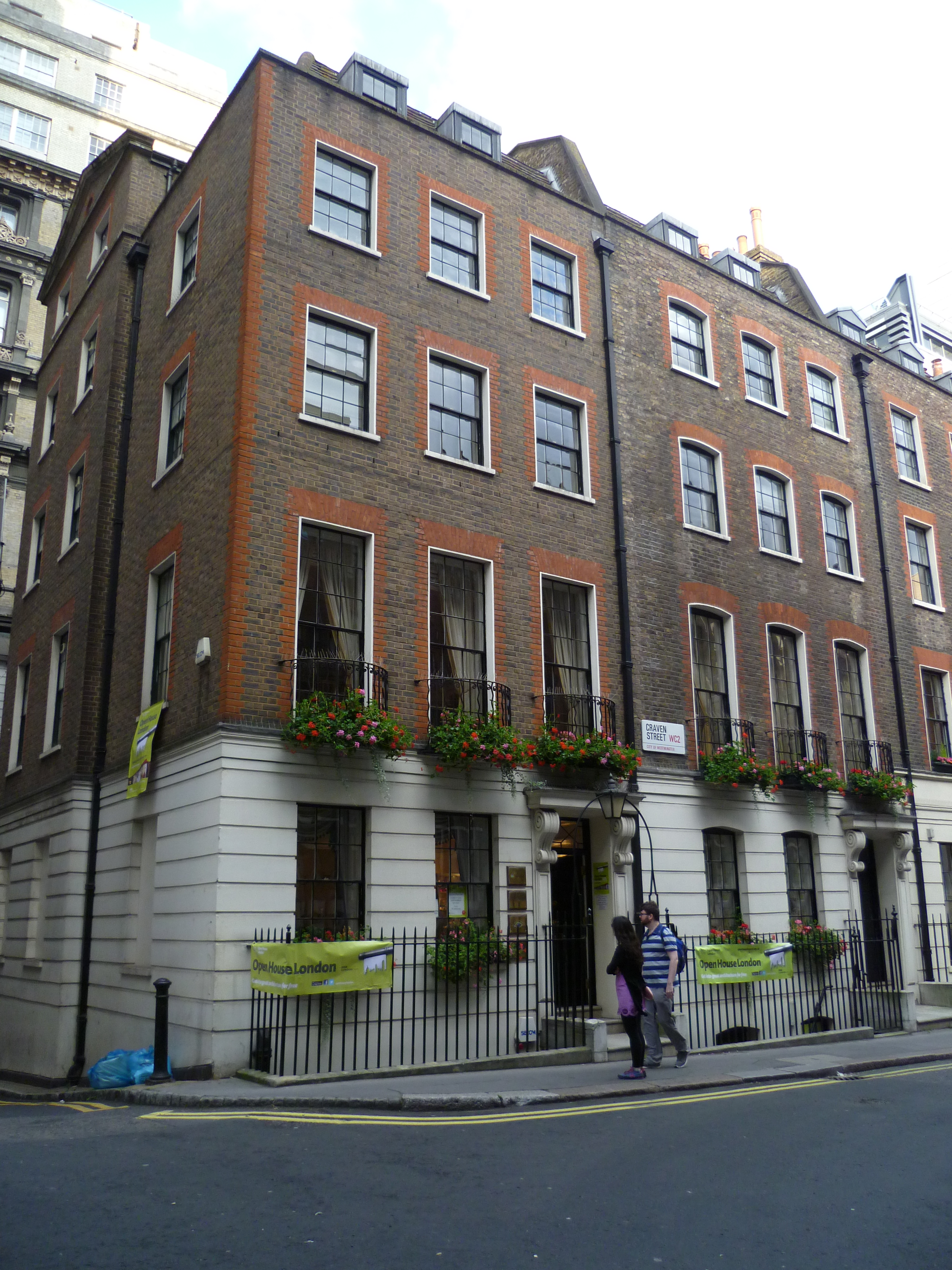
The British Optical Association Museum

The British Optical Association (BOA) was founded in February 1895 as the first professional body for ophthalmic opticians (optometrists) in the world. The British Optical Association Museum and Library was founded in 1901; it retains the BOA name but is now part of the College of Optometrists, located in Craven Street, Charing Cross, central London.

== History ==
At a meeting called by Mr Robert Sutcliffe, a sight-testing optician of Rochdale, the BOA was formed and elected the distinguished London optician John Browning (scientific instrument maker) as its first President. The BOA ran the first professional examinations in optics in 1896 and campaigned over many years for the state recognition of the profession, finally achieving success in 1958 with the passing of the Opticians Act by Parliament. It operated a number of local associations across the UK and was responsible for establishing the Army Spectacle Depot during World War I and establishing the Joint Council of Qualified Opticians (JCQO) together with the Institute of Ophthalmic Opticians (IOO) in 1922. The BOA also provided the Secretariat for a number of other optical bodies including what would eventually become the Association of Optometrists and the International Optometric and Optical League (IOOL), known since 1995 as the World Council of Optometry.

In a series of amalgamations the BOA swallowed up the smaller rival examining bodies, the National Association of Opticians (NAO) in 1955, and the Institute of Optical Science (IOSc) in 1962. In 1980, the BOA joined forces with the Worshipful Company of Spectacle Makers (WCSM) and the Scottish Association of Opticians (SAO, now disbanded) to found the British College of Ophthalmic Opticians (Optometrists); the title was changed to the British College of Optometrists in 1987 and, with the grant of a Royal Charter in 1995, the territorial distinction was dropped and the name shortened to the College of Optometrists.

Fellows of the British Optical Association were entitled to use the affix FBOA, introduced in 1897, and those who held only the Dioptric Grade the affix DBOA or the Ophthalmometric Grade, the little-used affix OBOA. These latter grades were abolished in 1923. Examinations for dispensing opticians were first introduced in 1928. The BOA also administered several higher qualifications including the Diploma in Contact Lens Practice (DCLP), introduced in 1961, and awarded the BOA Research Medal from 1953. The Association published the Dioptric Review from 1896 which continued with breaks and with minor changes of title until 1961 when it was replaced by The Ophthalmic Optician a journal jointly sponsored by the BOA and the AOP. A learned clinical journal, the British Journal of Physiological Optics was produced from 1925, on the Association's own in-house printing press.

After a peripatetic existence in Rochdale, Blackpool and London, an 'Association House' was eventually acquired in 1914 at Clifford's Inn Hall, a former Inn of Chancery close to the former Public Records Office. From 1934, when that building was compulsorily purchased for demolition, and until 1978, the BOA was housed at 65 Brook Street, Mayfair.

== British Optical Association Museum ==
The British Optical Association Museum was founded in London, England, by John H. Sutcliffe, OBE, in January 1901 as a collection of historic spectacles and visual aids designed to illustrate the development of corrective eyewear. It subsequently expanded the scope of its collection to encompass ophthalmic instrumentation and the depiction of optometric subject matter in works of art such as paintings, prints and sculpture. With over 27,000 catalogued objects (including archives) it may be judged as one of the most comprehensive and high quality collections of its type. It is believed to be the oldest such museum to be open to the public. Many of its objects are rare survivals and several are unique.

The museum is located at the College of Optometrists at the north end of Craven Street, adjacent to Charing Cross railway station in Westminster. Visits to the museum gallery are free and by advance appointment only.

The BOA Museum provides a heritage service to the College, the WCSM and the wider optical professions. The public may visit the exhibition rooms (the Sutcliffe Room and Giles Room) by prior appointment or pay for a guided tour of the College meeting rooms in which various exhibits are displayed. Museum staff are available to give external lectures and objects are frequently lent to temporary exhibitions at other accredited museums in the UK and occasionally overseas.

The BOA Museum is a UK Accredited Museum and a member of the London Museums of Health & Medicine.
