= Association of Optometrists =

British medical membership organisation

- Abbreviation: AOP
- Founded: February 20, 1946; 80 years ago
- Location(s): London, EC1; United Kingdom
- Members: 17,000
- Website: www.aop.org.uk
- Formerly called: Association of Optical Practitioners

The Association of Optometrists (AOP) is the leading representative membership organisation for optometrists in the United Kingdom.

It supports over 82% of practising optometrists (members) to fulfil their professional roles to protect the nation's eye health.

== Activities and services ==
The Association provides a range of professional services and products to its members, including:

- Indemnity insurance
- Legal representation and advice
- Continuing education and training (CET)
- Annual conferences, events and webinars
- News, online and print, under the brand title Optometry Today
- Political lobbying

== History ==
The organisation traces its history back to 1946. when the Institute of Ophthalmic Opticians (formed in 1904) and the Joint Council of Qualified Opticians (founded in 1923), were incorporated into The Association of Optical Practitioners.

In 1986, the organisation renamed to the Association of Optometrists. The organisation retains use of the 'AOP' acronym.

In 2017 the organisation reported it had grown to "17,000+ members", "representing 80% of UK optometrists".

== Publishing ==
The organisation publishes a professional journal, Optometry Today.

== See also ==
- European Academy of Optometry and Optics
- World Council of Optometry
- American Optometric Association
- American Academy of Optometry
