= London Museums of Health & Medicine =

Group of museums in London, England

The London Museums of Health & Medicine is a group that brings together some of the activities of several museums in London, England, related to health and medicine. The group was founded in 1991.

The museums and medical organisations are:

- Alexander Fleming Laboratory Museum
- Anaesthesia Heritage Centre
- Barts Pathology Museum
- Bethlem Museum of the Mind
- British Dental Association Museum
- British Optical Association Museum (College of Optometrists)
- British Red Cross Museum
- Chelsea Physic Garden
- Florence Nightingale Museum
- Foundling Museum
- Freud Museum
- Hunterian Museum
- Langdon Down Museum of Learning Disability
- Museum of the Order of St John
- Old Operating Theatre Museum & Herb Garret
- Royal Botanic Gardens, Kew
- Royal College of Nursing Library & Heritage Centre
- Royal College of Obstetricians and Gynaecologists
- Royal College of Physicians
- Royal London Hospital Museum
- Royal Pharmaceutical Society Museum
- Royal Society of Medicine
- Science Museum
- St Bartholomew's Hospital Museum
- St George's Museum and Archives
- Worshipful Society of Apothecaries

== See also ==
- List of museums in London
