= Irvin Borish =

American optometrist (1913–2012)

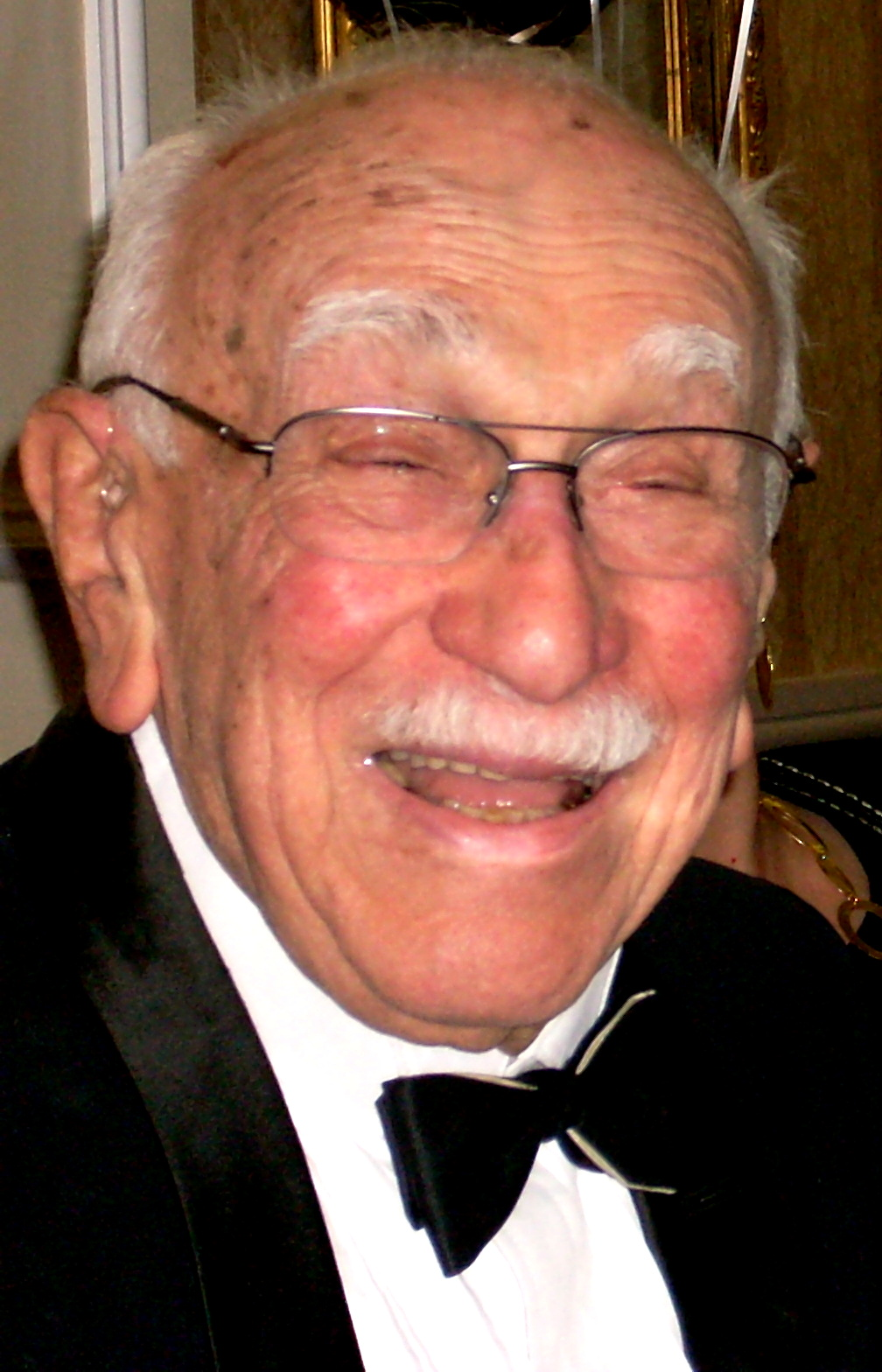
- Born: January 21, 1913; Philadelphia, Pennsylvania
- Died: March 3, 2012 (aged 99); Boca Raton, Florida
- Occupation: Optometrist
- Known for: "The Father of Modern Optometry"
- Notable work: Clinical Refraction (1949)
- Spouse: Beatrice Silver (m. 1936)

Irvin M. Borish (January 21, 1913 – March 3, 2012) was an American optometrist widely regarded as "The Father of Modern Optometry." Although he entered the field because his family could only afford two years of college, he made a lasting impact on optometry. He authored Clinical Refraction, one of the most renowned textbooks in the field. Borish also played a key role in establishing several educational and research institutions for optometry and advocated extensively to elevate optometry to the status of a recognized medical profession. His contributions to the field have been acknowledged through numerous prestigious awards and widespread recognition from his peers.

== Biography ==
=== Early life and education ===
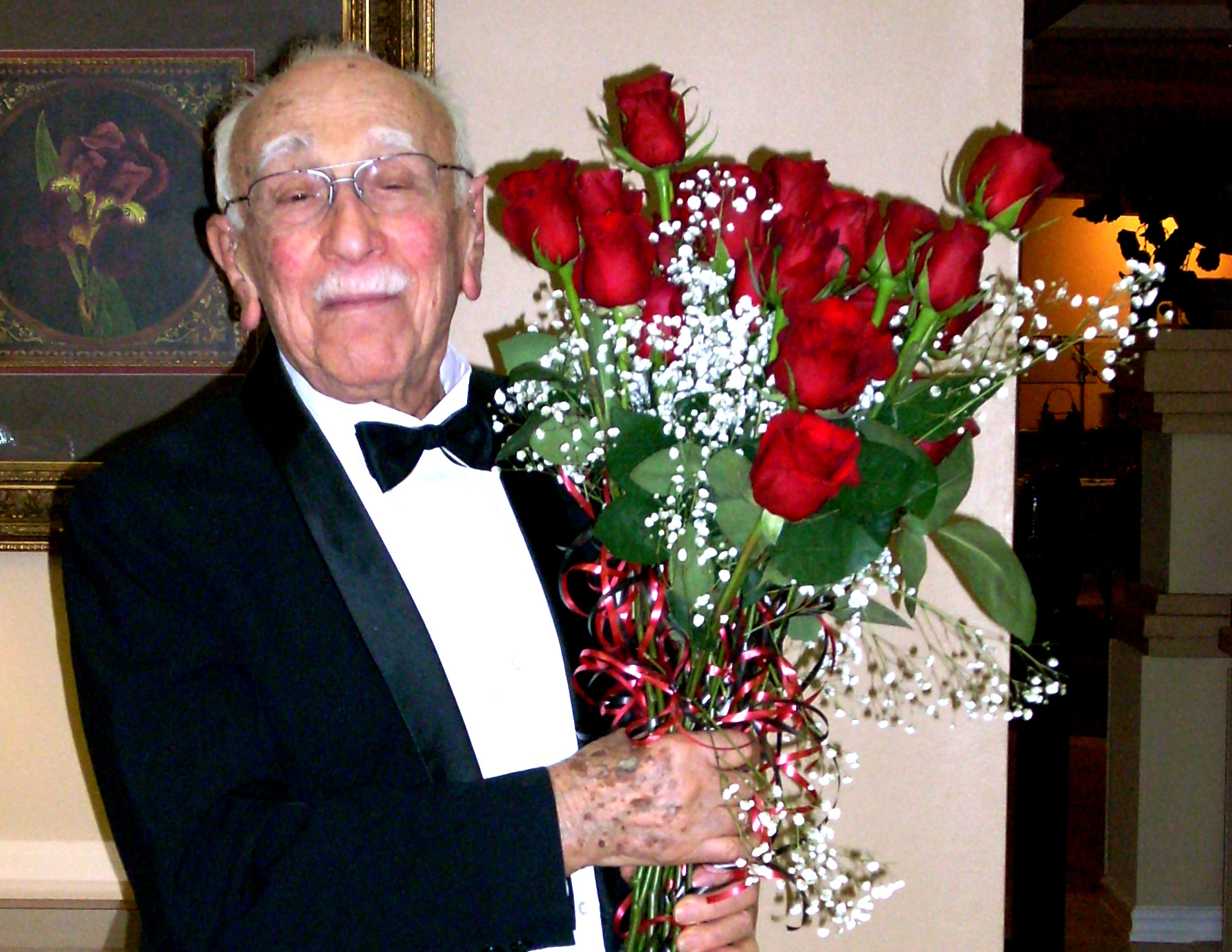
Picture taken on his 95th birthday

Irvin M. Borish was born on January 21, 1913, in Philadelphia, Pennsylvania. He had a younger brother and sister who were twins. His family later moved to Liberty, New York, located in the Catskill Mountains, where his father, Max, sought treatment after contracting tuberculosis. Liberty offered facilities for tuberculosis patients, and to support the family, Borish's mother ran a boarding house for TB patients.

Borish developed a love for reading at an early age. In college, he read every book in the fiction section of the library. However, he was severely nearsighted, and when his family was finally able to afford his first pair of glasses, he recalled seeing individual leaves on trees for the first time in his life.

He graduated from high school in the spring of 1929, just as the Great Depression was beginning. His family could only afford to send one child to college for two years, and since Irvin showed the most potential, he was chosen. Initially aspiring to become an author, he enrolled at Temple University in Philadelphia to study literature. While in college, Borish was persuaded by his uncle, Lou, to consider a career in optometry, which promised greater financial stability. Since optometry was a two-year program, it was more affordable, and Lou and his wife also offered Borish free room and board.

Borish later moved to Chicago, where he enrolled at the Northern Illinois College of Optometry. Unable to afford textbooks, he relied on the library to access the required materials.

=== Marriage and children ===
Borish met Beatrice Silver (“Bea”) while attending Temple University. Bea came from an affluent family, and the two were introduced on a blind date arranged by mutual friends. Both were well-read, and they engaged in lively conversation. According to Borish, he “was a good dancer,” but Bea was seeing two other men at the time, and nothing came of the date, largely because Borish lacked the financial means to take her out.

Several months later, they reconnected when Borish ran into Bea at a school dance. He learned of a local play offering discounted tickets and invited her on a date. Borish was so poor that their dates often consisted of going to an ice cream shop where, as Borish recalled, “We'd buy one soda and two straws.”

The couple married on June 28, 1936. Their daughter, Frances Martha, was born the following year. During childbirth, Bea nearly died, and Borish spent weeks caring for their newborn while she recovered. Due to the complications of her first pregnancy, they decided not to have more children.

=== Northern Illinois College of Optometry ===
Richard Needles, a pioneer in optometric education, was the owner and president of the Northern Illinois College of Optometry (NICO), where Borish spent both his student years and his initial teaching career.

In 1937, when Needles planned the construction of a new clinic for the college, he tasked Borish with developing a comprehensive outline of the structure for the architects. Over the years, Borish developed close friendships with Needles and Jere Heather, the academic administrator at the clinic. However, neither could be considered his mentor, as they learned as much from Borish as he did from them.

That same year, Borish wrote a clinical manual on refraction and other ophthalmic procedures for use by his students. Since no comprehensive textbook on refraction had been written in the United States, the manual generated significant interest among practitioners who had the opportunity to review it. Eventually, it was adopted by state board examiners.

When Heather left in 1938, Borish assumed his responsibilities, taking over all academic and administrative duties associated with the clinic. However, when the United States entered World War II, NICO experienced a decline in enrollment, leading to financial challenges and increasing discord within the college's leadership. These difficulties ultimately led to Borish's resignation.

=== Contributions to optometry ===
In 1944, Borish moved to Kokomo, Indiana, to establish a private optometry practice and apply his knowledge directly to patient care. Finances were tight for his family, and due to the ongoing war, businesses—including his own—struggled to operate and attract clients.

That same year, Borish petitioned to create an Indiana chapter of the American Association of Optometry. He served as the chapter's president for two terms and later as secretary.

After the war ended, there was a surge in enrollment at optometry schools in 1947, creating a demand for a comprehensive textbook. Marty Topaz, owner and publisher of Optometric Weekly Magazine, approached Borish to write one. The resulting work, Clinical Refraction, was published in 1949. The book went through four editions, with the final edition renamed Borish's Clinical Refraction, becoming a standard reference in the field of optometry.

Between 1962 and 1982, Borish was deeply involved in a nationwide effort to prepare and promote optometry for an expanded role in healthcare. He recognized that for optometry to be recognized as a mainstream science, it needed to be taught at universities. However, there was resistance from some ophthalmologists, who considered optometry to be quackery. Over several years, Borish lobbied and negotiated extensively to pass two key laws in Indiana: one that incorporated diagnostic and therapeutic drugs into optometric practice and another that mandated the teaching of optometry at universities. He also served as an editorial consultant and referee for the Journal of the American Optometric Association.

Borish contributed to the creation of the accreditation system used by the Council on Education of the American Optometric Association and co-authored the association's first Manual of Accreditation. From 1968 to 1982, he served on the accrediting body.

In 1973, after a near-fatal heart attack, Borish was reluctant to slow down, but his wife encouraged him to return to academia. He joined Indiana University in Bloomington, where he taught and conducted research. He was instrumental in establishing a separate School of Optometry, as optometry had previously been taught as a division of the College of Arts and Sciences.

In 1982, Borish accepted a position as Benedict Professor of Optometric Practice at the University of Houston. His colleagues and friends initiated a campaign that raised one million dollars to establish the Irvin M. Borish Chair in Optometric Practice.

In 1994, Indiana University opened the Center for Ophthalmic Clinical Research, naming it the Borish Center for Ophthalmic Research in his honor. From 1982 until 2000, Borish was invited annually to speak to the freshman class, sharing the history of optometry and recounting how he influenced its evolution.

=== Corneal contact lenses ===
As contact lenses grew in popularity, Borish became an early adopter, prescribing them to several of his clients and family members. He was particularly interested in bifocal contact lenses and devised methods and processes to optimize their performance. To produce high-quality lenses, he established a laboratory in partnership with Emil Faris and Ronald Ulmer, naming it the Indiana Contact Lens Company.

Borish held several patents for his work on contact lenses. He developed methods to alter the spherical and cylindrical powers of lenses, which he later applied in the process of making bifocal lenses. He drew inspiration for this method while observing a Dr. Scholl's shoe insert display at a drugstore.

Borish also served as a consultant for Bausch & Lomb and other eyewear and lens manufacturers for many years.

=== Art ===
Borish had a lifelong artistic inclination. He wrote several poems for his wife, Bea, and in the early 1950s, he took up drawing as a hobby. Inspired by Leonardo da Vinci's complete set of drawings, he used them to refine his skills. Borish always had at least one painting in progress and experimented with diverse styles, ranging from impressionistic to surreal. He also donated several of his paintings, some of which were used in charity auctions to raise funds for various causes.

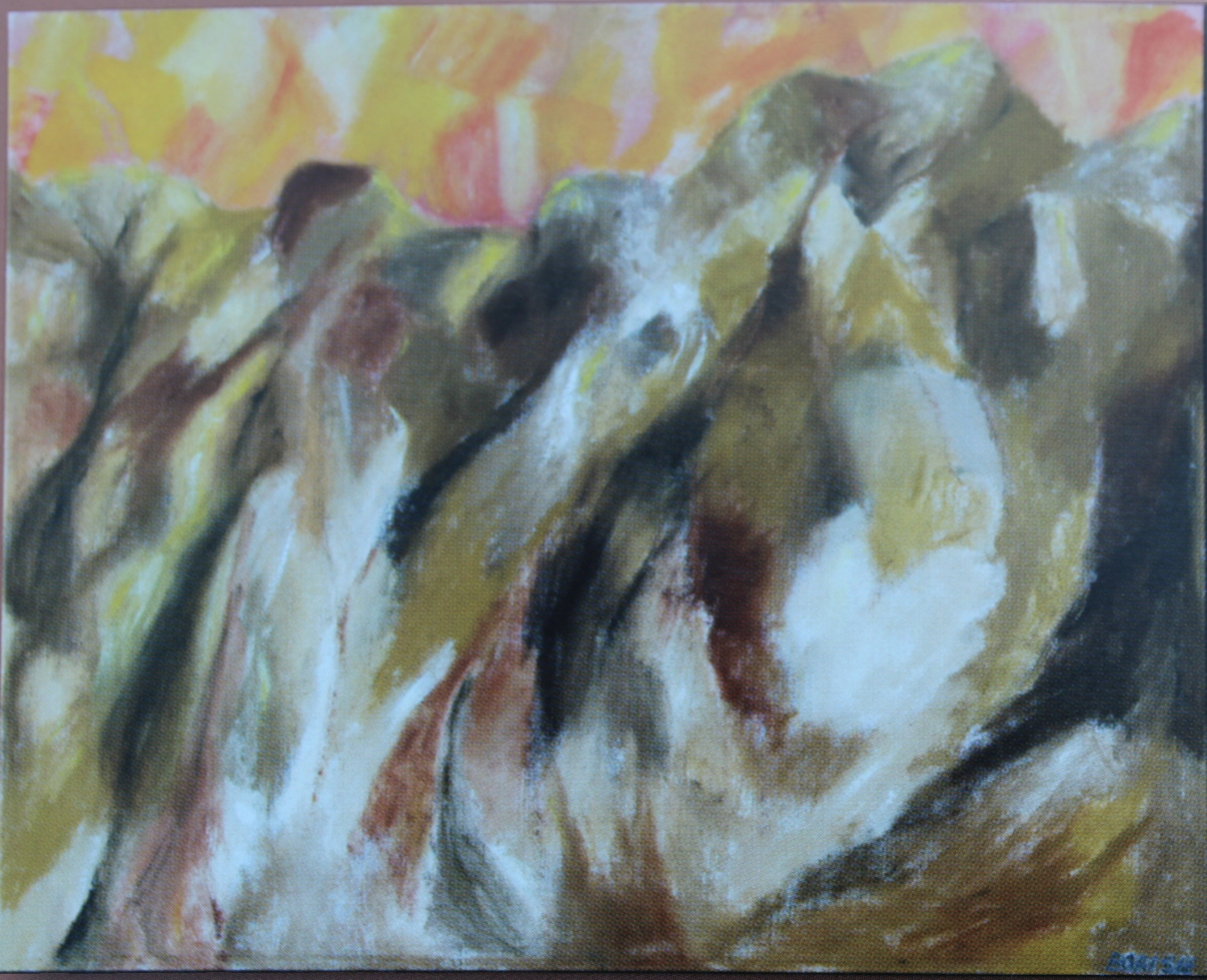
Early Abstract, 1965

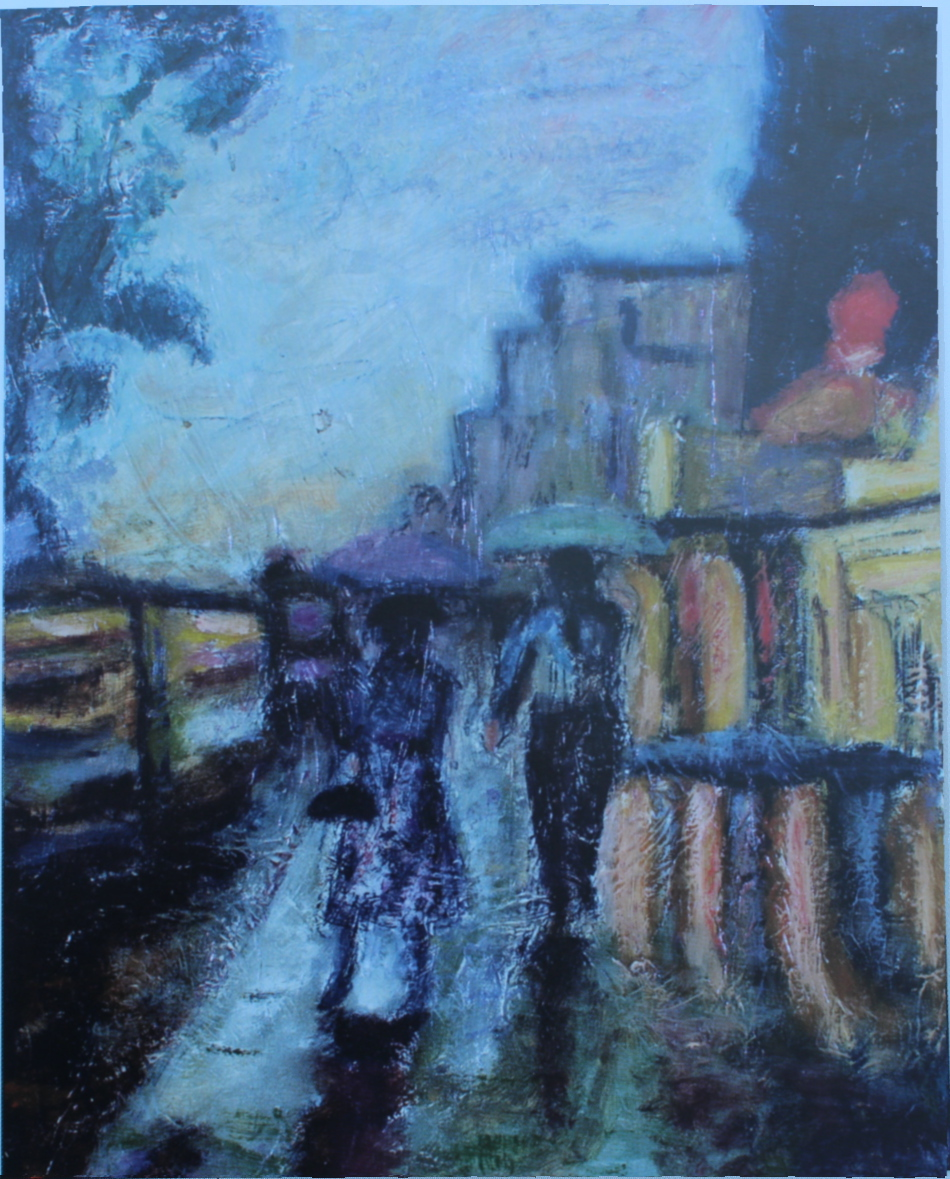
Street Scene, 1968

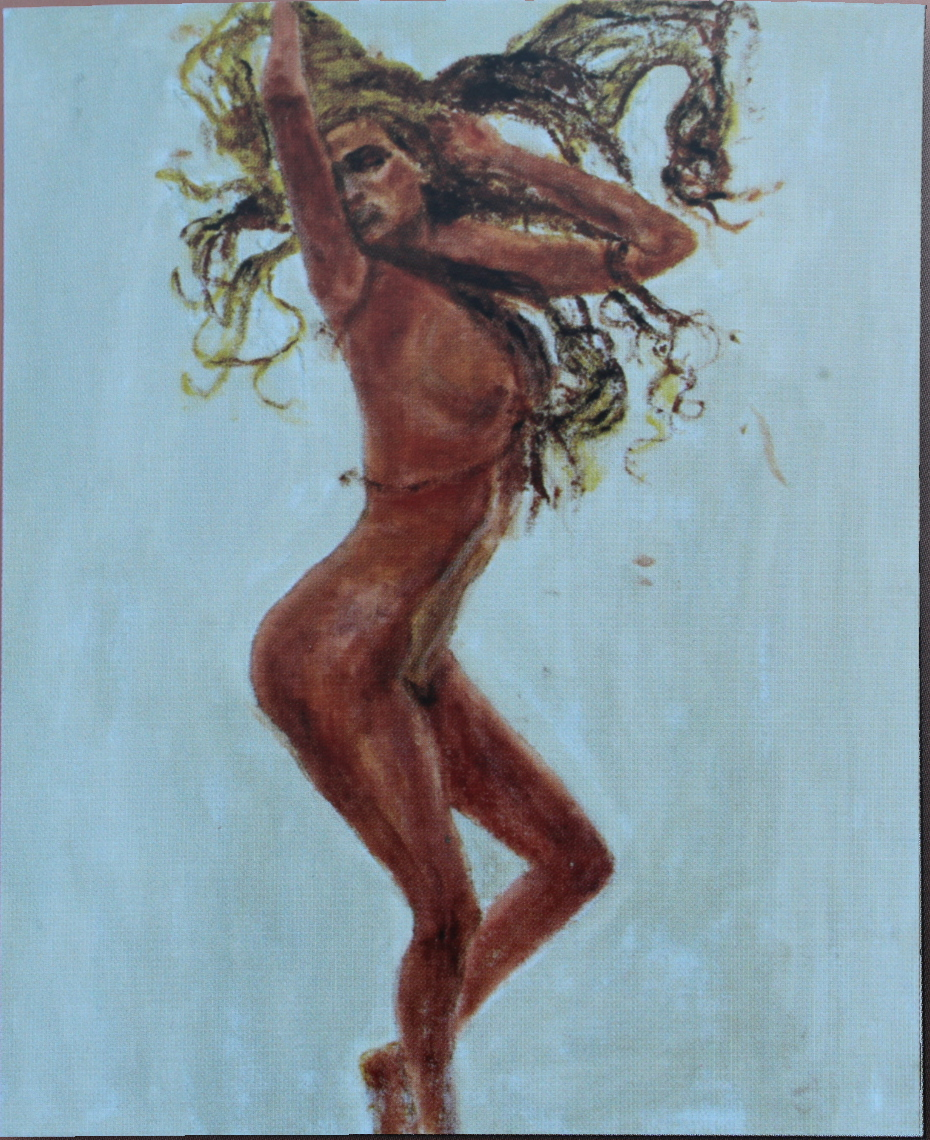
Red Nude, 1992

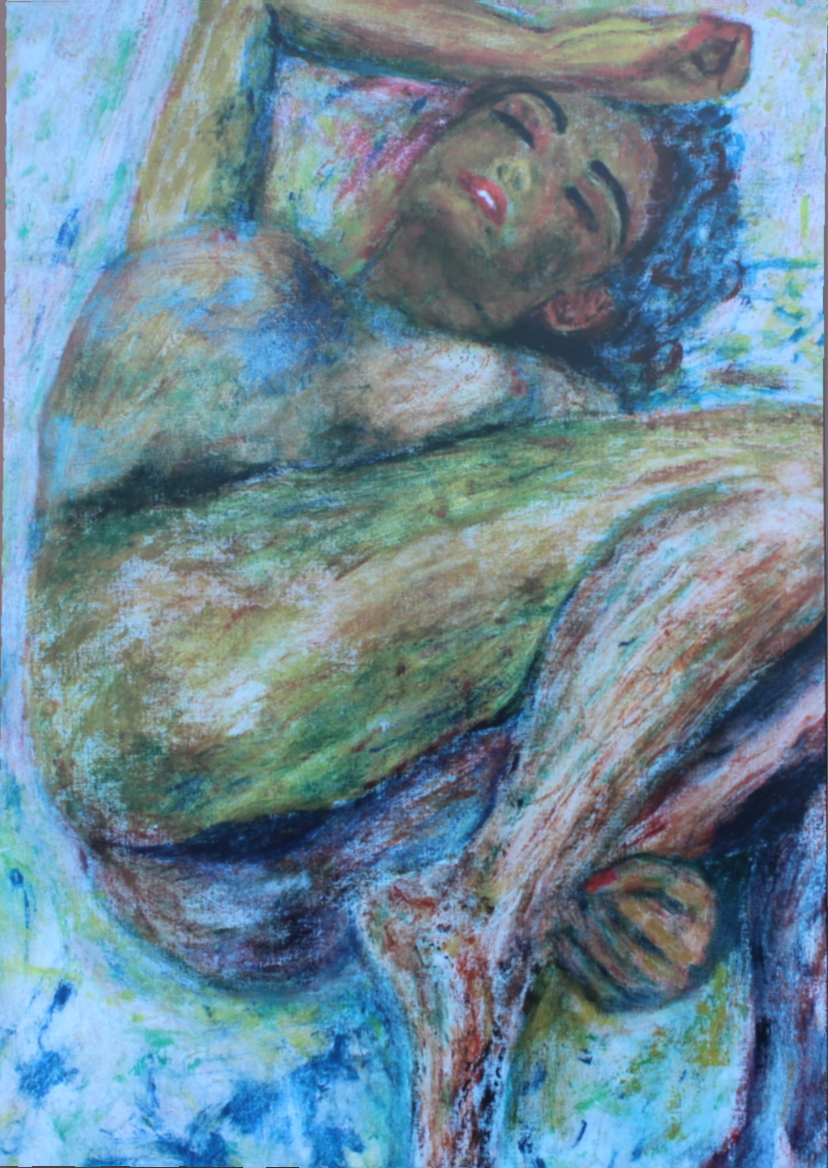
Beige Nude, 1994

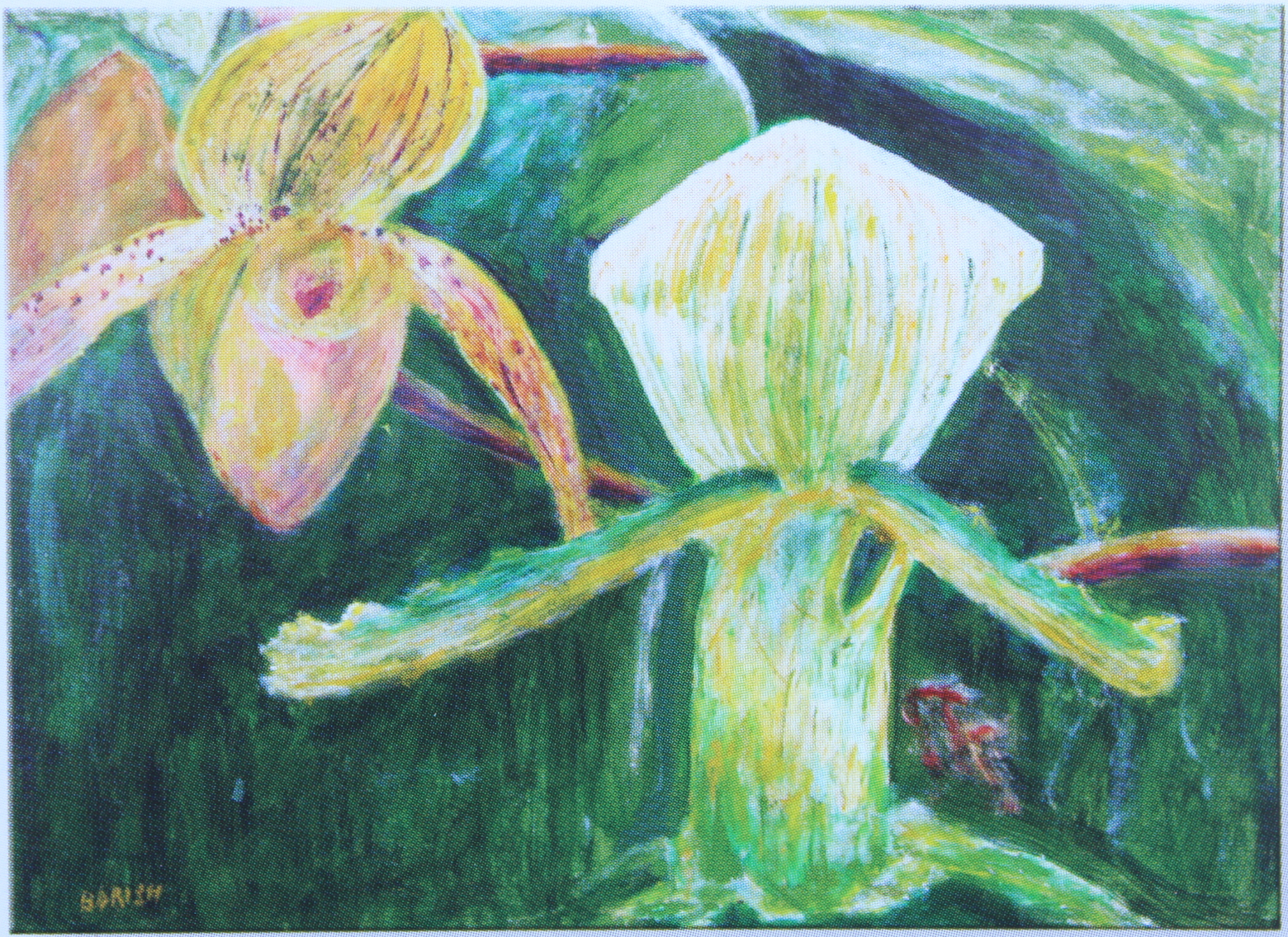
Orchids, 1996

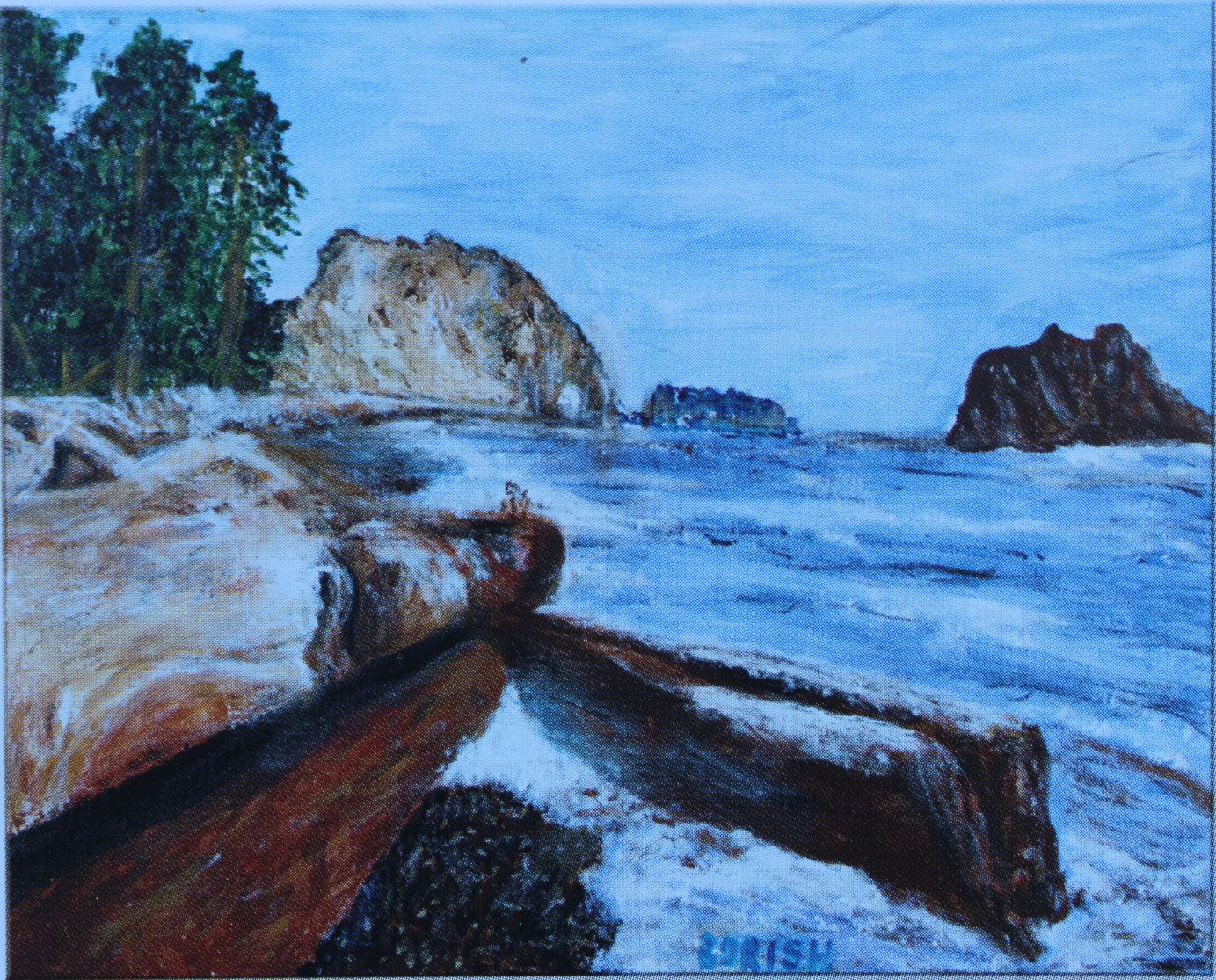
Seascape, 1997

=== Retirement ===
In 1990, Borish retired due to his wife's deteriorating health, and they relocated to Palm Beach County, Florida. Despite retiring, he remained active and continued to contribute to the field of optometry.

Borish lectured at the Vision Expo in New York and California, at the American Academy of Optometry's (AAO) Ellerbrock Courses, and at numerous state and regional association meetings, as well as optometry schools. From 1980 to 2010, he was invited annually to speak to the freshman class at the University of Houston, where he emphasized the importance of understanding and appreciating the history of optometry. He created and delivered a lecture addressing this topic, along with his perspectives on the responsibilities of practitioners and the public image of optometry. This lecture, which remained largely unchanged over the years, was later uploaded to YouTube.

Borish also contributed content to From Eye Examination to Ophthalmic Lenses, a Chinese book on refraction, as well as later editions of Clinical Refraction, System of Ophthalmic Dispensing, David Miller's Textbook of Ophthalmology, and several published articles. Even after retirement, he received three of his nine honorary degrees and 11 of his more than 60 awards. He continued to attend AAO and American Optometric Association (AOA) meetings and participated in Essilor Symposiums.

Borish passed away in Boca Raton, Florida, on March 3, 2012, at the age of 99.

== Awards and notices ==
- 1968 - AOA Apollo Award (American Optometric Association) Nominated by Dr. H.W. Hofstetter, Division of Optometry
- 1968 - Indiana University - Honorary LL. D degree
- 1975 - Pennsylvania College of Optometry - Honorary D.Sc. degree
- 1979 - American Optometric Students Association - Golden Key International Award
- 1982 - Paul Harris Fellow
- 1983 - Retired from Indiana University - Title of professor emeritus of Optometry
- 1983 - Nominated to the National Academy of Practice in Optometry as a distinguished practitioner in Optometry
- 1983 - Southern California College of Optometry in Fullerton - Honorary degree of Doctor of Ocular Science
- 1984 - State University of New York at Albany - Honorary degree of Doctor of Science in Optometry
- 1985 - American Academy of Optometry's William Feinbloom Award.
- 1989 - American Optometric Association - Distinguished Service Award
- 1987 - Tel Aviv University - Friendship Award
- 1987 - Heart of America Contact Lens/Primary Care Congress - Visual Services Award
- 1988 - American Academy of Optometry - Max Schapero Memorial Lecturer award, for his significant contribution to contact lens research
- 1988 - AOA (American Optometric Association) - Life Membership
- 1988 - AOA Contact Lens Person of the Year
- 1989 - AOA Distinguished Services Award - An announcement in the AOA Bulletin said - "Congratulations to Dr Irvin M. Borish… Irv has been selected for the AOA Distinguished Services Award for 1989 to be awarded at the Congress in New York… Irv was an AOA Apollo awardee in 1968 and has more honorary degrees than a trigonometry class."
- 1998 - Only living person to be inducted into the National Optometry Hall of Fame.

== Contributions ==
Borish made numerous significant contributions to the field of optometry throughout his career. He co-founded and served as Vice President of Indiana Contact Lens, Inc. He also worked as a consultant for several major optical companies, including Bausch & Lomb, Ciba-Geigy, and American Hydron.

Borish served as chairman of the International Advisory Board for the Tel Aviv University Optometry Program and held visiting professorships at 11 different institutions. He played a pivotal role in the establishment of several key organizations, including:

- The Association of Schools and Colleges of Optometry
- The AOA Council on Clinical Optometric Care
- The Association of Contact Lens Manufacturers
- Optometric Research Institute

Borish co-authored the first accreditation manual for the AOA Council on Education and was instrumental in establishing the first optometry school in China. Additionally, he invented the Borish Vectographic Nearpoint Card, a device designed to test both eyes simultaneously while reading.

== Patents ==
- US 3,238,676 - Method for altering the power of a Corneal Contact Lens
- US 3,360,889 - Method for altering the power of a Corneal Contact Lens
- US 3,430,391 - Apparatus for altering the power of a corneal contact lens
- CA 878212 - Apparatus and method for altering the power of a corneal contact lens and product resulting therefrom
- CA 853920 - Corneal contact lens polishing

== Publications ==
- Borish I.M. Outline of Optometry. Chicago: LeGros & Co., 1938.
- Borish I.M. Clinical Refraction. Chicago: Professional Press, 1949; 2nd Edition, 1954; 3rd edition, 1970; 3rd edition in 2 volumes, 1975.
- Borish I.M. Comments on a "delayed subjective" test. Am J Optom Arch Am Acad Optom 1945;22:433 - 436.
- Borish I.M. Comments on the large undergraduate enrollment in certain optometric colleges. Am J Optom Arch Am Acad Optom 1946;23:530 - 538.
- Borish I.M. Prismatic prescriptions – a clinical report on 147 cases. Am J Optom Arch Am Acad Optom 1948;25:579 - 592.
- Borish I.M. Comments about subjective refraction and the importance of reliable communication. J Am Optom Assoc 1960;31:457 - 462.
- Borish I.M. Historical development of refractive techniques. J Am Optom Assoc 1967;38:941 - 945.
- Borish I.M. Indiana University – Division of Optometry. J Am Optom Assoc 1968;39:270 - 276.
- Borish I.M. Ballasted cylinder lenses. J Am Optom Assoc 1971; 42:243.
- Borish I.M. Optometric education. J Am Optom Assoc 1975; 46:540 - 543.
- Borish I.M. Ballasted cylindrical lenses. J Am Optom Assoc 1976;47:318.
- Borish I.M. The Borish near point chart. J Am Optom Assoc 1978;49:41 - 44.
- Brooks C.W., Borish I.M. System for Ophthalmic Dispensing. Chicago: Professional Press, 1979; 2nd edition, Boston: Butterworth Heinemann, 1966.
- Borish I.M., Hitzeman SA, Brookman KE. Double masked study of progressive addition lenses. J Am Optom Assoc 1980; 51:933 - 943.
- Borish I.M., Soni S. Bifocal contact lenses. J Am Optom Assoc 1982; 53:219 - 229.
- Borish I.M. The academy and professionalism. Am J Optom Physiol Opt 1983; 60:18 - 23.
- Borish I.M., Hitzeman S.A. Comparison of the acceptance of progressive addition multifocals with blended bifocals. J Am Optom Assoc 1983; 54:415 - 422.
- Borish I.M. Aphakia: perceptual and refractive problems of spectacle correction. J Am Optom Assoc 1983; 54:701 - 711.
- Borish IM, Perrigin D. Relative movement of lower lid and line of sight from distant to near fixation. Am J Optom Physiol Opt 1987; 64:881 - 887.
- Borish IM. Pupil dependency of bifocal contact lenses. Am J Optom Physiol Opt 1988; 65:417 - 423.
- Benjamin WJ, Borish IM. Physiology of aging and its influence on the contact lens prescription. J Am Optom Assoc 1991; 62:743 - 753.
- Borish IM. Don't leave a vacuum. Optom Economics 1991; 62:718 - 721.
- Borish IM. Teaching the traditional optometry with the new optometry. Optom Vis Sci 1993; 70:637 - 639.
- Young J.M., Borish I.M. Adaptability of a broad spectrum of randomly selected patients to a variable design progressive lens: report of a nationwide clinical trial. J Am Optom Assoc 1994; 65:445 - 450.
- Borish I.M., Catania LJ. Traditional versus computer - assisted refraction: "Which is better?" J Am Optom Assoc 1997; 68:749 - 756. (erratum in J Am Optom Assoc 1998; * 69:484)
- Borish IM. Optometry: Its heritage and its future. Indiana J Optom 2001; 4:23 - 31.
