= Polly Stevenson =

English polymath, friend of Benjamin Franklin

Mary "Polly" Stevenson Hewson
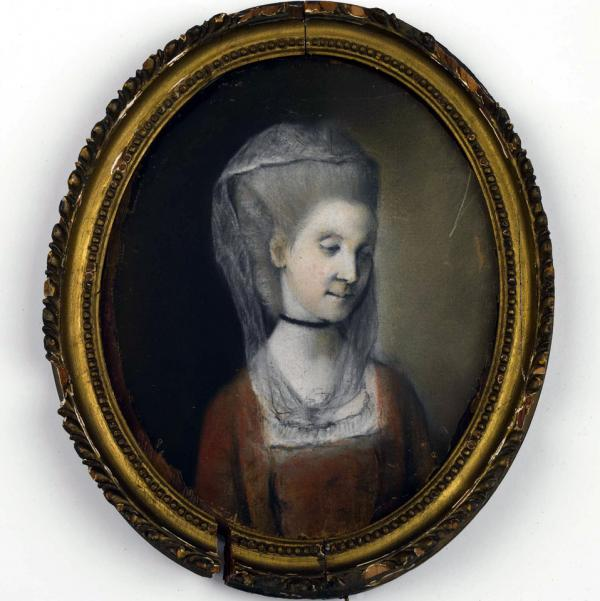
- Portrait of Stevenson c. 1770
- Born: 15 June 1739
- Died: 14 October 1795 (aged 56)
- Spouse: William Hewson
- Parent: Margaret Rooke Stevenson

Mary "Polly" Stevenson Hewson (15 June 1739 – 14 October 1795) was a self-educated English polymath and friend and correspondent of Benjamin Franklin. Franklin lived in her home as a boarder during both of his stays in London: 1757–1762 and 1764–1775.

She was born on 15 June 1739 to Margaret (c. 1706–1783) and Addinell Stevenson (d. c. 1747). Her father died while she was young and her middle-class mother let rooms to lodgers in their home at 36 Craven Street, near Charing Cross. It's not recorded if Stevenson received any formal education as a youth, and her mother was nearly illiterate, but she was already an eloquent writer by the time she met Franklin when she was eighteen.

Benjamin Franklin rented a suite of rooms from her mother during his first visit to London in 1757, where he acted as an agent for the Pennsylvania Assembly. The pair seem to have become quick friends, and in 1760 she asked Franklin to tutor her in philosophy, engineering, and natural science. Their correspondence indicate that Stevenson selected topics she wished to study, and Franklin obliged to share his knowledge with her. Partly through Franklin, she was able to broaden her social circle of intellectuals, and corresponded with them, learning from some and mentoring others.

Franklin wished that his son, William, might marry Stevenson, but in 1769 she informed Franklin that she'd met an anatomist, William Hewson, whom she would marry the next year. The marriage was short, as her husband died only four years later.

Stevenson and Franklin continued corresponding until his death in 1790. Stevenson died in 1795.
