= Craven Street =

Street in the City of Westminster

Coordinates: 51.5074°N 0.1248°W

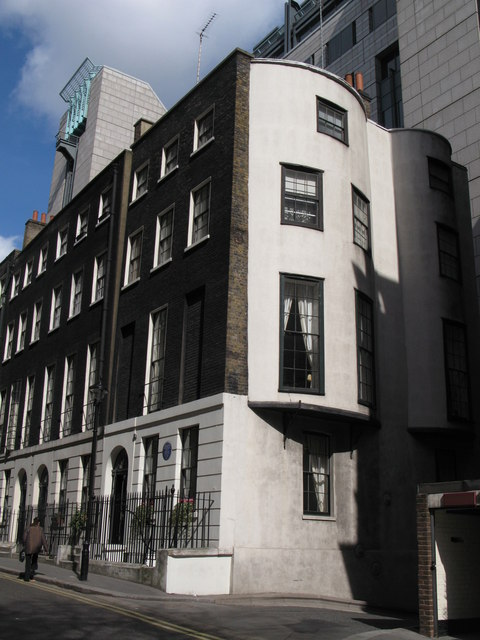
Houses in Craven Street

Craven Street is a street in the City of Westminster, England, near The Strand. Several notable historical figures have lived in the street which was the home of Benjamin Franklin, when he lived in London before the American Revolution.

== History ==
The street was originally known as Spur Alley. It was rebuilt around 1730 when the land was owned by the Craven family and it received its current name then.

== Location ==
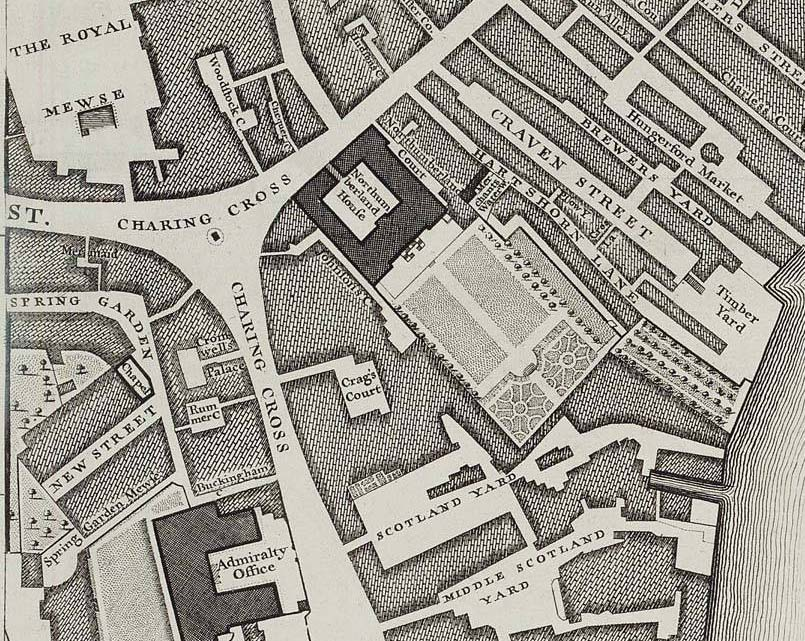
Craven Street (top right) on John Rocque's map of London, 1746.

Craven Street runs from The Strand in the north to Northumberland Avenue in the south. Corner House Street and Hungerford Lane join Craven Street in the north and halfway along Craven Street it is crossed by Craven Passage which is pedestrian only and joins Craven Street to Northumberland Street and Hungerford Lane. Hungerford Lane rejoins Craven Street at its southern end.

== Residents ==
Mark Akenside, author of The Pleasures of the Imagination, lived at No. 33 from 1759 to 1761.

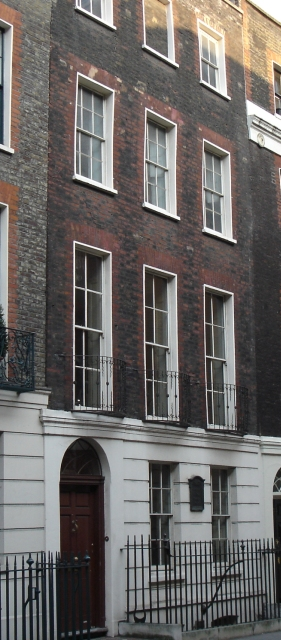
Benjamin Franklin's House, Craven Street, London

Benjamin Franklin lived at No. 36 for sixteen years before the American Revolution. The house is a Grade I listed building with Historic England and now functions as a museum known as Benjamin Franklin House.

Pioneer of haematology William Hewson, lived at No. 36 for two years from 1772 at the same time as Franklin. In 1998 workmen discovered the remains of six children and four adults underneath the house which may relate to medical experiments carried out by Hewson.

Aaron Burr, 3rd Vice President of the United States lived abroad from 1808 to 1812, passing most of his time in England, where he occupied a house on Craven Street in London.

The German poet Heinrich Heine lived at No. 32 in 1827. A plaque marks the house.

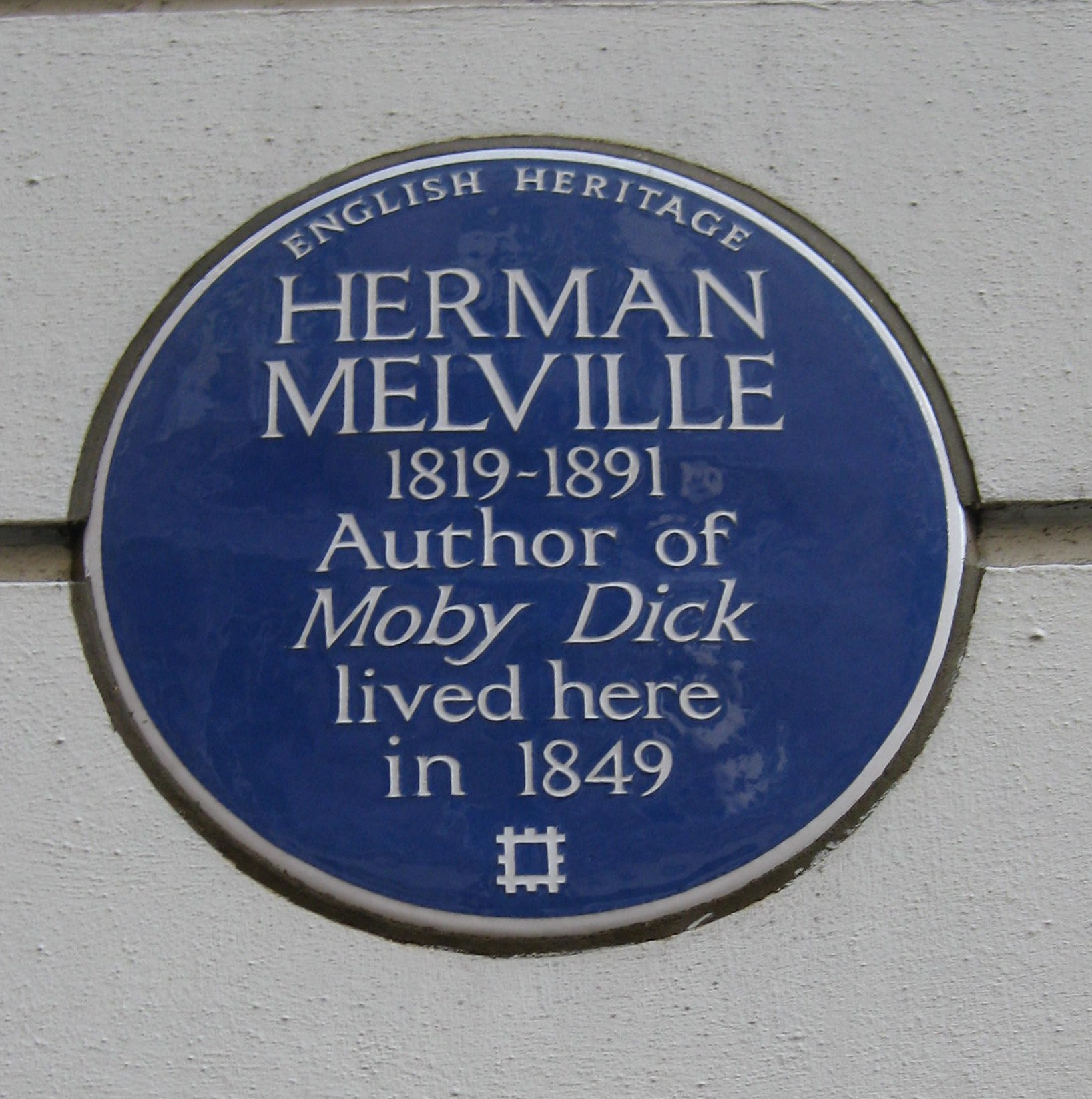
The blue plaque to Herman Melville at No. 25.

Herman Melville, author of Moby Dick, lived at No. 25 in 1849 when he visited London as a sailor during his youth. A blue plaque marks the house.

The European Academy of Optometry and Optics headquarters is located at No. 42.
