= Margaret Rooke Stevenson =

Landlady to Benjamin Franklin

Margaret Rooke Stevenson (1706–1783) was a British landlady and close friend of Benjamin Franklin. Franklin rented rooms from her during both of his stays in London: 1757–1762 and 1764–1775.

She was married to Addinell Stevenson, a merchant, and they had one child, Mary (better known as Polly), in 1739. Her husband died in about 1747. After his death, Stevenson and her daughter moved to 36 Craven Street, near Charing Cross, London, and began letting rooms to lodgers. The listed building is now known as Benjamin Franklin House.

Her most famous tenant was American Founding Father Benjamin Franklin, who rented a suite of four rooms in the house beginning in 1757. The widowed Stevenson took on many of the social responsibilities of a wife for Franklin: she accompanied him to functions around London and hosted dinner parties with him. In a letter to his wife Deborah (who remained in Philadelphia), Franklin called Stevenson "a certain very great Lady, the best Woman in England".

Even though Stevenson found writing an "oddieus taske", she maintained an active correspondence with Franklin while he returned to America. After Franklin's wife died in 1774 Stevenson hoped that he might marry her, but this did not happen.

Stevenson died in 1783.
