= Grand Building =

Former hotel building overlooking Trafalgar Square

Coordinates: 51.5076°N 0.1264°W

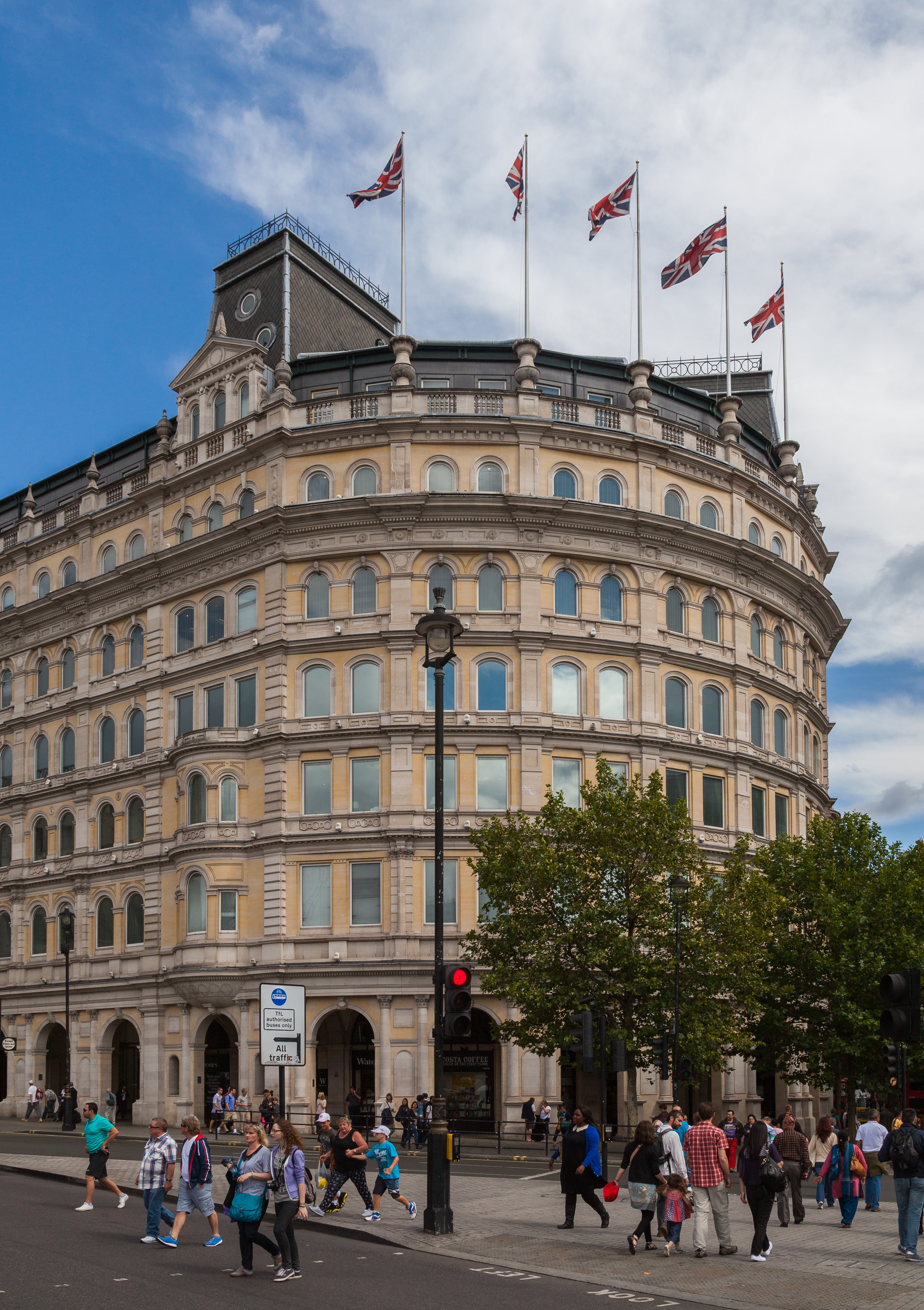
The current Grand Building

The Grand Building or Grand Buildings is a large building block on the corner of Northumberland Avenue and the Strand in London. It was formerly known as the Grand Hotel which it was built to serve. The current building is a 1986 reconstruction which preserved much of the exterior design due to its prominent position overlooking Trafalgar Square.

== Background ==
The site of the Grand Building was previously occupied by Northumberland House before its demolition in 1874. Northumberland Avenue was cut through connecting Trafalgar Square with the recently built Victoria Embankment as part of the Metropolitan Board of Works' overall improvement plan for the west end. The development was intended to create a luxury hotel district, with Frederick Gordon's Gordon Hotel group completing much of the work.

Alongside the Grand Hotel, as the Grand Building was then known, were the Hotel Metropole (now the Corinthia) and the Hotel Victoria, now a mixed events venue known as 8 Northumberland Avenue. Confusingly the former Hotel Victoria building is also sometimes called Northumberland House, and even more so hosts a boutique hotel known as The Grand.

== History of use ==
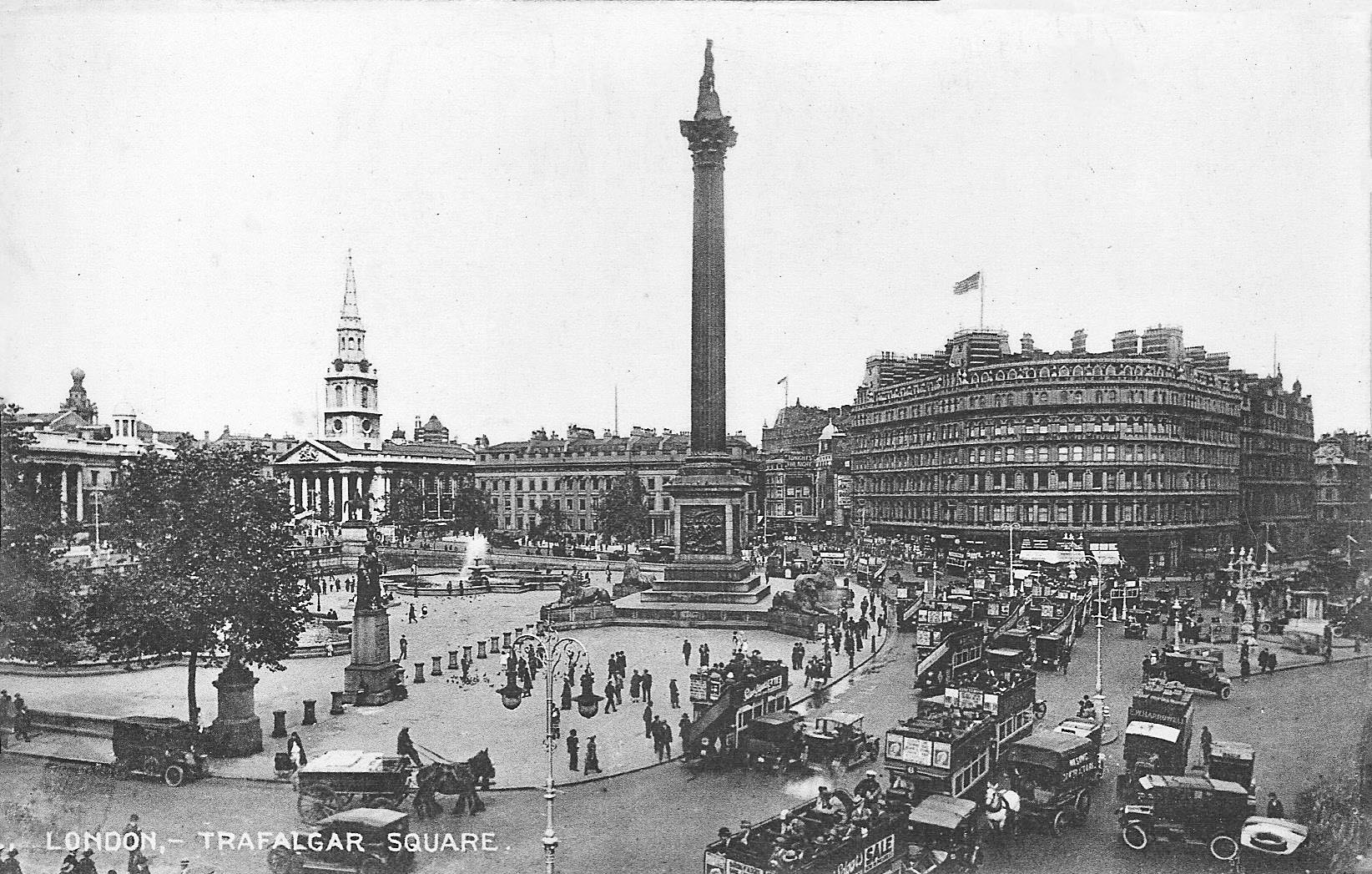
Trafalgar Square in the 1920s with the Grand Building seen on the right

The Grand Hotel was built between 1877 and 1881 by Frederick John and Horace Francis with J. E. Saunders. Designed with a grand ornamented facade it held 500 rooms within its seven storeys. The Palm Court and Winter Garden as well as a ballroom with decorative mosaics by Antonio Salviati would be among the most appreciated amenities. Jakob Buckrhardt would describe it as a "seven-storeyed, nicely be-sculptured oval stone belly".

The building would serve as a hotel until the First World War where it would, given its proximity to Whitehall, be requisitioned by the wartime government to accommodate military officers. In the 1930s it would be repurposed once again as a retail headquarters.

Into the late 20th century, the building would fall into a state of general disrepair. In 1986, various architectural plans were submitted as to what to do with the site. Sidell Gibson Architects would carry out a rebuild of the structure with a near identical exterior, citing the historic and cultural significance the building's imposing and central position held. The building remains in use as office space.
