= Benjamin Franklin House =

London residence of Benjamin Franklin

Coordinates: 51°30′27″N 0°7′30″W

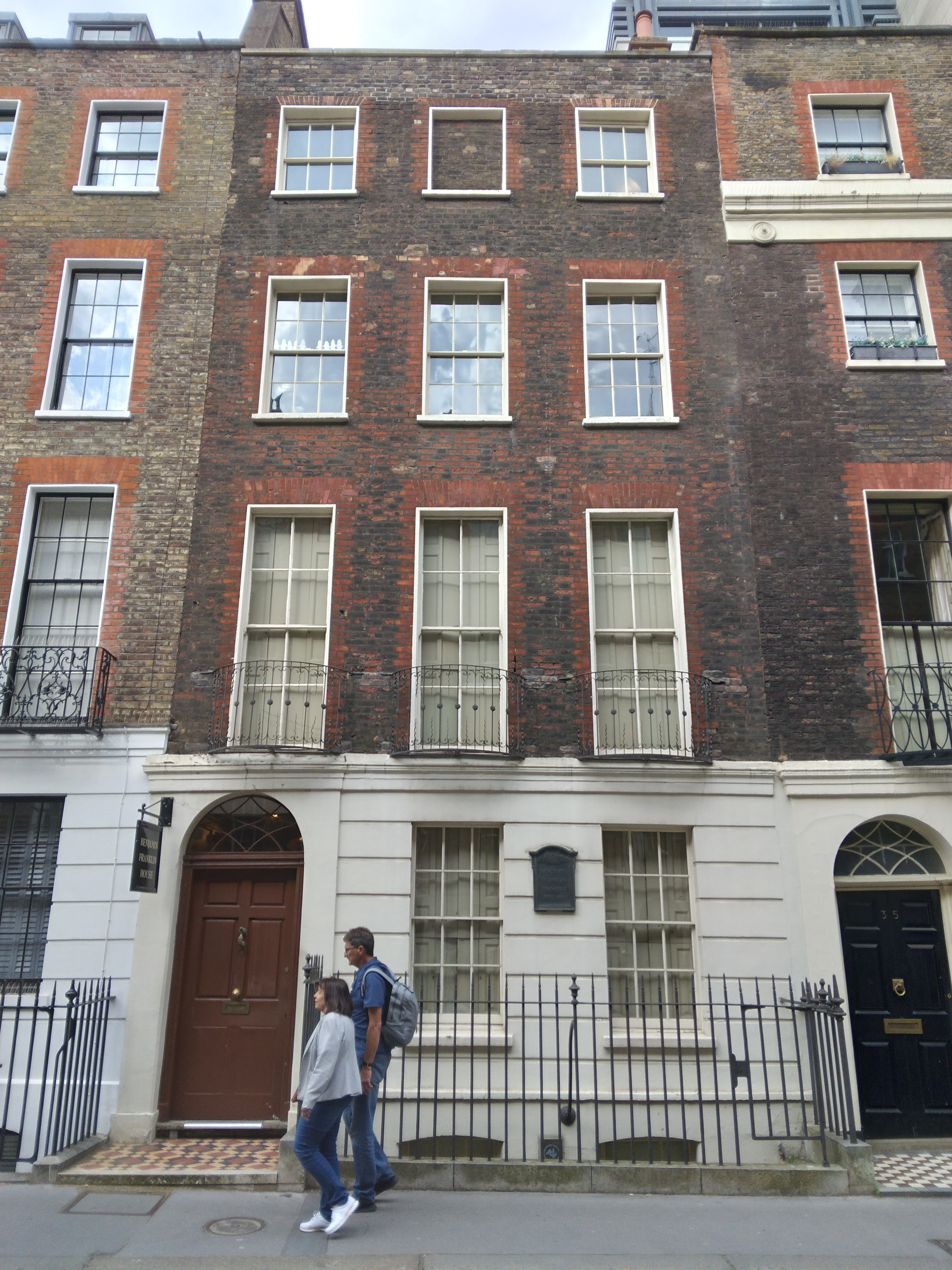
Benjamin Franklin's House, Craven Street, London

Benjamin Franklin House is a museum in a terraced Georgian house at 36 Craven Street, London, close to Trafalgar Square in the West End of London. It is the last-standing former residence of Benjamin Franklin, one of the Founding Fathers of the United States. The house dates from c. 1730, and Franklin lived and worked there from 1757 to 1774, when it was owned by Margaret Stevenson. The museum opened to the public on 17 January 2006. The chairman is American-British investment banker and philanthropist John Studzinski.

The house is listed Grade I on the National Heritage List for England for its historic association with Franklin.

== Conservation ==
The house was renovated and restored in 1998 by The Friends of Benjamin Franklin House in order for the house to be turned into a museum. During the excavation the remains of 10 individuals were identified, consisting of numerous bones and bone fragments; six of them identified as possible children.

Tests conducted on the remains showed that they were around 200 years old, which means that they may have been buried in the basement at the same time that Franklin was living there. However, further evidence showed that a close friend of Franklin, William Hewson, was the one responsible for the human remains. Hewson, an early anatomist, had lived in the house for two years and had been working in secret, since there were still legal issues in dissecting certain cadavers at the time. Franklin likely knew what Hewson was doing, but probably did not participate in the dissections.

The museum at 36 Craven Street is a Grade I listed property and retains a number of its original features (include original floorboards, original ceilings, and original staircases) with relatively few later alterations. Current conservation policies emphasise the need for minimal modern interventions.

Artefacts at the house include a modern, playable replica glass harmonica, based on Franklin's design.

== Modern facilities ==
The "Historical Experience" includes actors portraying historical characters associated with the house along with dialog, sound, lighting, and special effects. The character used in the "Historical Experience" is Polly Stevenson Hewson, the daughter of Franklin's landlady who became a "second daughter" to Franklin.

The "Student Science Centre" allows students to re-create experiments from Franklin's sojourn in London. It includes a Medical History Room (focused on the medical research of William Hewson, who did his work from the house for a time), a Discovery Room (containing historical artifacts), and a Demonstration Room (in which students can replicate Franklin's experiments).

The Benjamin Franklin House is open free-of-charge to school visits on Tuesdays. Although designed for key stage 2 students, visits can be tailored for students of all key stages.

The "Scholarship Centre" on the top floor of the House is a centre for study of the many subjects Franklin pursued.

Benjamin Franklin House runs an annual Literary Prize in which people interpret a Benjamin Franklin quote in its significance today.

== See also ==
- Grade I listed buildings in the City of Westminster
- Benjamin Franklin National Memorial, a U.S. national memorial in Philadelphia
- Franklin Court, the site of one of Franklin's residences in Philadelphia
