= Optometry Today =

British optometry journal

- Categories: Professional magazine
- Frequency: Bimonthly
- Format: Print, online
- Circulation: 17,708 (2022)
- First issue: 1961; 64 years ago
- Company: Association of Optometrists
- Based in: London, United Kingdom
- Website: www.optometry.co.uk

Optometry Today is a professional magazine, published bimonthly by the Association of Optometrists in the United Kingdom.

The magazine's content regularly includes; news and features about scientific and technological developments in the optical sector, changes to legislation affecting optometrists and optical professionals, developments in the optical business and retail environment, new product and equipment launches, and reviews.

The printed publication and website also include General Optical Council accredited Continuing Professional and Development articles with linked assessments, which UK optical professionals are required to undertake to maintain their professionally registered status with the General Optical Council.

Subscription to the magazine is included as part of the membership of the Association of Optometrists.

== History ==
The publication was established in 1961 as The Ophthalmic Optician. Following the move of academic institutions to adopt the term 'optometry' (in place of 'ophthalmic optics') during the late 1970s and 1980s the magazine was renamed Optometry Today' in 1985.

== Awards ==
In 2016, the magazine won the 'Best Professional Association or Royal College magazine' accolade at the Memcom Awards.
