= William Hewson (surgeon) =

British physiologist

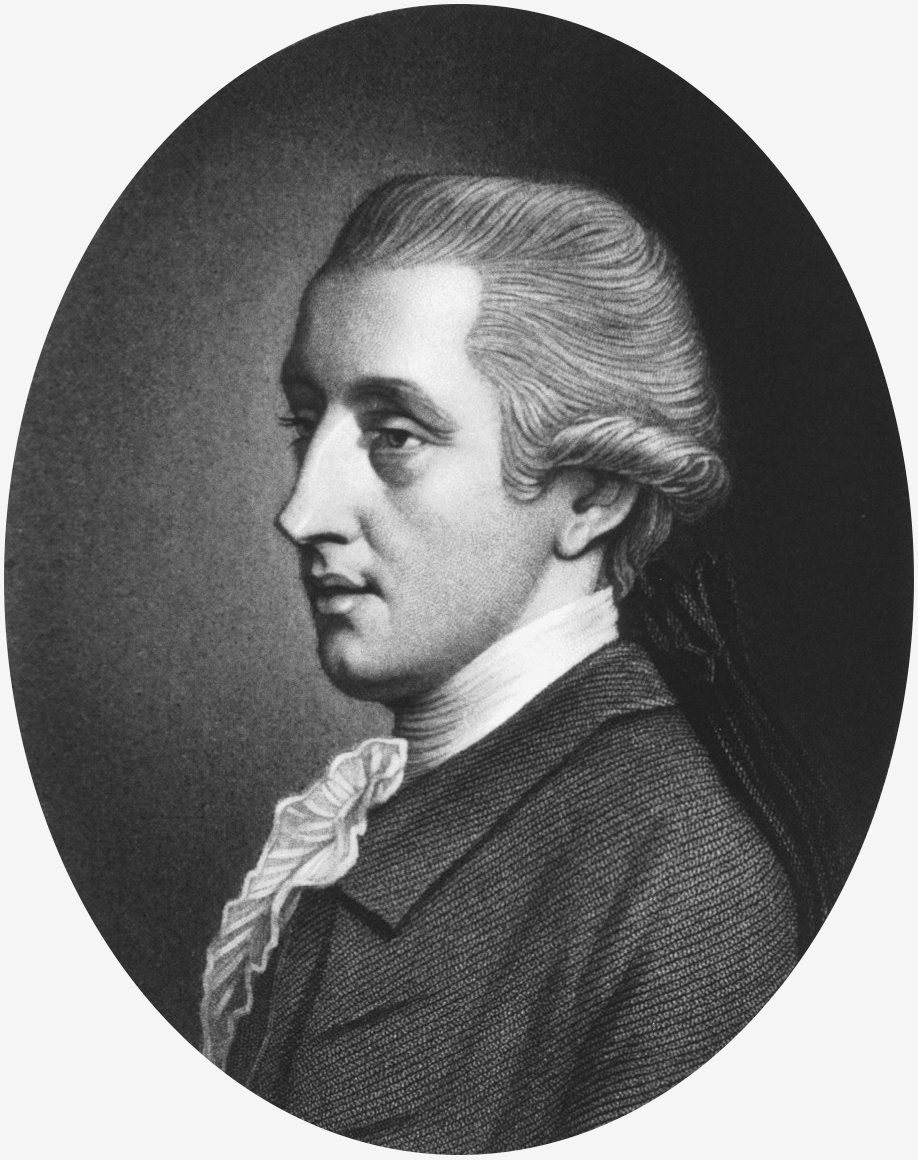
- Born: 14 November 1739; Hexham
- Died: 1 May 1774 (aged 34)
- Known for: haematology
- Spouse: Polly Stevenson
- Awards: Copley Medal (1769)
- Scientific career
- Fields: Surgery anatomist physiologist

William Hewson (14 November 1739 – 1 May 1774) was a British surgeon, anatomist and physiologist who has been referred to as the "father of haematology".

== Biography ==
Born in Hexham, Northumberland, Hewson initially studied in 1753 at the Newcastle Infirmary, Newcastle upon Tyne (which later became the Royal Victoria Infirmary) under its founder Richard Lambert and much later in the winter of 1761/1762 in Edinburgh and was a student, and later an assistant, of William Hunter. In 1768 he was elected to the American Philosophical Society, he was awarded the Copley Medal in 1769, and elected to the Royal Society in 1770.

Hewson's major contribution was in isolating fibrin, a key protein in the blood coagulation process. His Copley work came when he showed the existence of lymph vessels in animals and explained their function by hypothesizing the existence of a human lymphatic system. He also demonstrated that red blood cells were discoid, rather than spherical as had been previously supposed by Anton van Leeuwenhoek, but incorrectly identified the cells' dark centers as their nuclei. In 1773 he produced evidence for the concept of a cell membrane in red blood cells – however, this last work was largely ignored.

On 10 July 1770 Hewson married Mary Stevenson (better known as Polly), a London friend of Benjamin Franklin. From September 1772 he ran an anatomy school at 36 Craven Street, where Franklin lodged in London (which is now the Benjamin Franklin House museum).

In 1998, workers restoring the London home (Benjamin Franklin House) dug up the remains of six children and four adults hidden below the home. The Times reported on 11 February 1998:

Initial estimates are that the bones are about 200 years old and were buried at the time Franklin was living in the house, which was his home from 1757 to 1762 and from 1764 to 1775. Most of the bones show signs of having been dissected, sawn or cut. One skull has been drilled with several holes. Paul Knapman, the Westminster Coroner, said yesterday: "I cannot totally discount the possibility of a crime. There is still a possibility that I may have to hold an inquest."

The Friends of Benjamin Franklin House (the organization responsible for the restoration of Franklin's house at 36 Craven Street in London) note that the bones were likely placed there by Hewson, who lived in the house for two years. They note that Franklin likely knew what Hewson was doing. Proof was demonstrated by archaeological evidence which showed liquid mercury associated with turtle bones and vermilion colouring associated with dog bones found in the deposit. Hewson had documented experimentation on the lymphatic system using both substances and animals.

Hewson died on 1 May 1774 as a result of sepsis contracted while dissecting a cadaver.

Hewson's work was continued after his death by Magnus Falconar, who had married Hewson's sister Dorothy in September 1774. Falconar repeated Hewson's experiments on the spleen and thymus and as a result re-published Hewson's work on red blood cells in 1777 together with his corroboration.

As part of his last will and testament (1789), Benjamin Franklin made the following bequest:

To my dear old friend, Mrs. Mary Hewson, I give one of my silver tankards marked for her use during her life, and after her decease I give it to her daughter Eliza. I give to her son, William Hewson, who is my godson, my new quarto Bible, and also the botanic description of the plants in the Emperor's garden at Vienna, in folio, with coloured cuts.
And to her son, Thomas Hewson, I give a set of "Spectators, Tattlers, and Guardians" handsomely bound.
