= European Academy of Optometry and Optics =

Membership organization

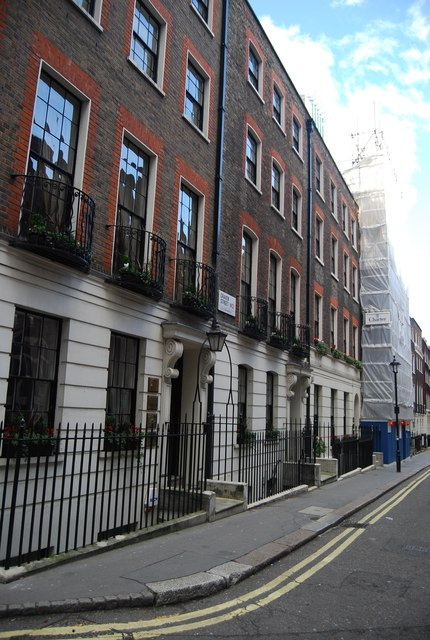
- 42 Craven Street, headquarters of the EAOO, on the left
- Abbreviation: EAOO
- Formation: 2009
- Type: Nonprofit
- Registration no.: 1134105
- Legal status: Charity
- Purpose: Optometry and optics
- Headquarters: 42 Craven Street, City of Westminster WC2N 5NG
- Location: London, United Kingdom
- Coordinates: 51.50790°N 0.12539°W
- Region served: Europe
- Services: Membership organization
- Methods: Annual EAOO conference
- Fields: Optometry; optics; vision science
- Official language: English
- President: José M. González-Méijome
- Vice President: Daniela Nosch
- Past President: Rupal Lovell-Patel
- Academy manager: Kristina Mihic
- Affiliations: World Council of Optometry
- Website: eaoo.info

The European Academy of Optometry and Optics (EAOO) is a membership organization for the development of optometry and optics in Europe. It aims to help in advancing scientific knowledge and learning for optometrists, opticians, and vision scientists, within Europe.

The EAOO organizes an annual conference, held at venues around Europe. For example:

- Dublin, Ireland in 2012
- Warsaw, Poland in 2014
- Berlin, Germany in 2016
- Helsinki, Finland in 2021
- Dublin, Ireland in 2022
- Poznań, Poland in 2023

== See also ==
- Association of Optometrists
- British Optical Association
- World Council of Optometry
