= Northumberland Street, London =

Street in the City of Westminster, London

Coordinates: 51°30′26.82″N 0°7′32.39″W

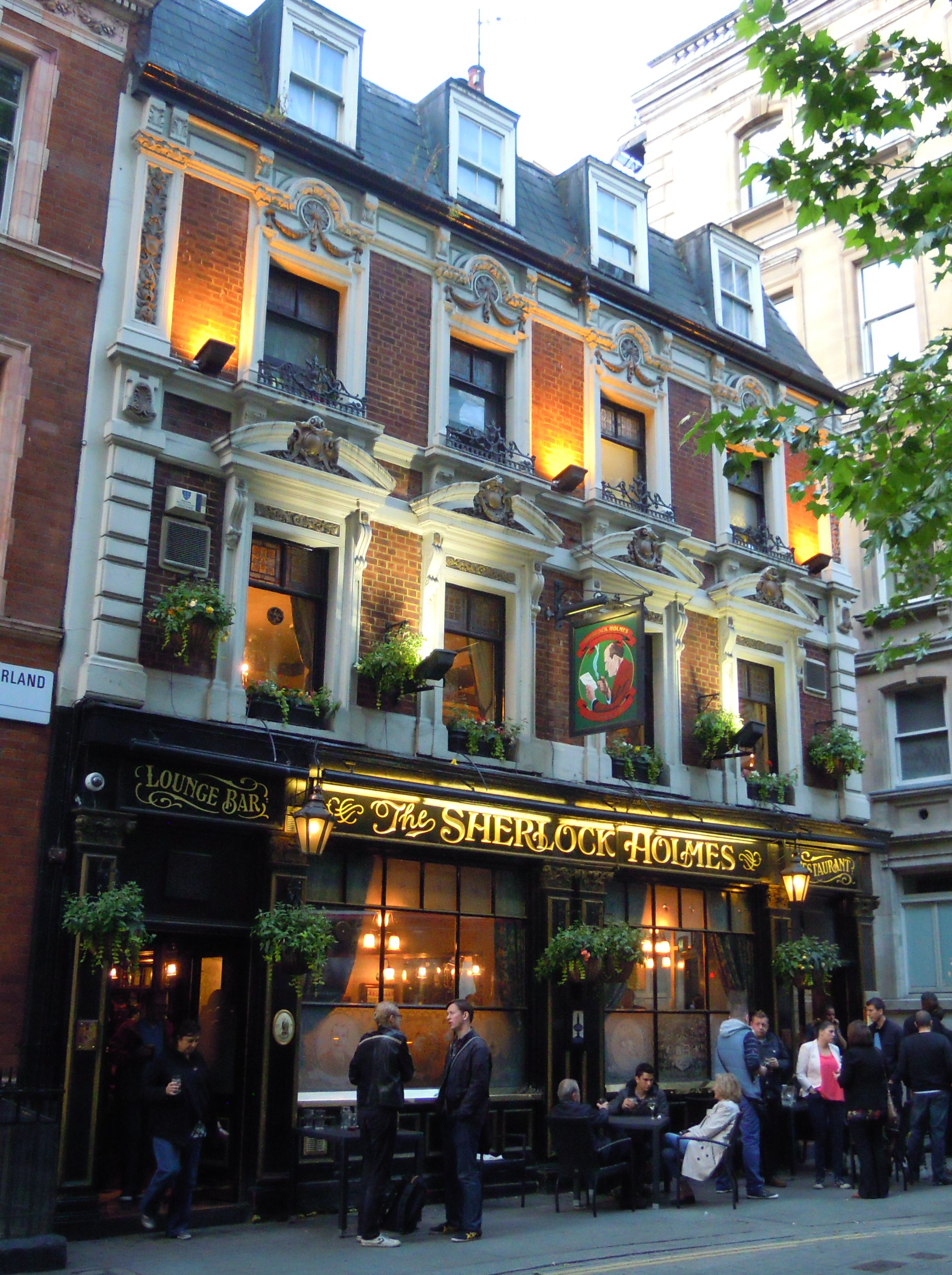
The Sherlock Holmes pub in Northumberland Street

Northumberland Street is a street in the City of Westminster.

== Location ==
The street runs from Strand in the north to Northumberland Avenue in the south. On its east side it is joined by Corner House Street and Craven Passage. It is part pedestrianised in the section leading off the Strand.

== History ==
Northumberland Street was originally known as Hartshorn Lane. The buildings in that lane were demolished to make way for Northumberland Street in the 1760s.

Dramatist Ben Jonson (c. 1572–1637) spent his youth in Hartshorn Lane and may have been born there.

=== The "Frightful Encounter in Northumberland Street" ===
On 12 July 1861, workmen saw a terribly wounded man, Major Murray, emerging from 16 Northumberland Street, crying "murder". They went upstairs and found a solicitor's office covered in blood. Another severely wounded man, Mr. Roberts, was crouched on the floor surrounded by evidence of a terrible fight: pools of blood, broken wine bottles, pistols, and overturned furniture. Roberts died of his wounds; Murray survived. His version of events was that he had been lured into the rooms under false pretences, and that Roberts had tried to kill him, and they had fought. He claimed to have no idea why he was attacked. However, police established that Roberts had become obsessed with Murray's mistress, and had planned to kill him out of jealousy. At Murray’s trial, the jury deemed his crime "justifiable homicide" because it was self-defence.

== Buildings ==
The Sherlock Holmes public house is located in the south of the street on the corner with Craven Passage.

The Royal Institution of Naval Architects is located at Nos. 8–9.

The offices of the Association of Teachers and Lecturers are at No. 7.

== See also ==
- Northumberland House
