= American Optometric Association =

American medical professional group

- Formation: 1898; 128 years ago
- Coordinates: 38.6585°N 90.4060°W
- President: Teri K. Geist, O.D.
- President-eclect: Terri A. Gossard, O.D., M.S.
- Website: www.aoa.org

The American Optometric Association (AOA) is an American medial professional group. Founded in 1898, it represents approximately 37,000 doctors of optometry, optometry students and para-optometric assistants and technicians in the United States.

== Overview ==
The AOA states that:

The American Optometric Association represents more than 49,000 doctors of optometry, optometry students and paraoptometric assistants and technicians. Optometrists serve patients in nearly 6,500 communities across the country, and in 3,500 of those communities are the only eye doctors. Doctors of optometry provide two-thirds of all primary eye care in the United States. Founded in 1898, the AOA is a federation of state, student and armed forces optometric associations. Through these affiliations, the AOA serves members consisting of optometrists, students of optometry, paraoptometric assistants and technicians.

The AOA has offices in St. Louis, Missouri (the headquarters) and Alexandria, Virginia, employing approximately 100 people. The association has four special interest sections: contact lenses and corneas, vision rehabilitation, sports vision and paraoptometrics.

== Journal ==
The AOA had its own journal, called Optometry – Journal of the American Optometric Association, published by Elsevier until 2012. It currently publishes relevant articles under the News section of their website.

== Colocation ==
In 2015, the World Council of Optometry (WCO) relocated to the AOA headquarters in St Louis.

== See also ==
- European Academy of Optometry and Optics
- World Council of Optometry
