= World Council of Optometry =

Worldwide optometry development organization

Coordinates: 38.6585°N 90.4060°W

The World Council of Optometry (WCO) is a membership organization for the development of optometry (eye care) internationally. The WCO is the first and only optometric organization to have official relations with the World Health Organization (WHO) which represents 250,000 optometrists from 75 member organizations in over 40 countries.

The WCO organizes the World Congress of Optometry.

In 2015, the WCO relocated to the American Optometric Association (AOA) headquarters in St Louis, Missouri, United States.

In 2024, the WCO meeting held in Melbourne, Australia.

The 6th World Congress of Optometry (WCO6) will be held from 2–4 April 2027 at the Riyadh International Convention & Exhibition Center in Riyadh, Saudi Arabia.

== See also ==
- American Optometric Association
- Eastern Mediterranean Council of Optometry
- European Academy of Optometry and Optics
