= Outline of health =

The following outline is provided as an overview of and topical guide to health:

Health has a variety of definitions which have been used for different purposes over time and is a multidimensional concept. It commonly refers to physical and emotional well-being. Good health is associated with normal functioning of the human body in day to day life, absent of disease, pain (including mental pain), or injury.

== Essence of personal health ==
- Homeostasis – property of a system in which variables are regulated so that internal conditions remain stable and relatively constant. Examples of homeostasis include the regulation of temperature and the balance between acidity and alkalinity (pH).
- Immunity
- Life – characteristic distinguishing physical entities having biological processes (such as signaling and self-sustaining processes) from those that do not, either because such functions have ceased (death), or because they lack such functions and are classified as inanimate.
- Mental health
- Physical fitness
- Survivability of the individual
- Wellness

=== Reproductive health ===
Reproductive health

- Reproductive rights
- Men's health
- Women's health
  - Vulvovaginal health
  - Maternal health
  - Breastfeeding
- Family planning
  - Fertility
  - Infertility
  - Birth control
- Sex education
- Safer sex
- Disorders
  - Sexually transmitted disease
  - Sexual dysfunction
- Reproductive medicine
  - Andrology
  - Gynaecology
  - Obstetrics and gynaecology

=== Poor health ===
Illness

- Disability
- Disease
- Injury
- Muscle weakness
- Mental disorder
- Susceptibility to the above

=== Absence of health ===
- Death – termination of all biological functions that sustain a living organism.

== Health maintenance ==
=== Personal health maintenance ===
Self-care

- Exercise
- General fitness training
- Healthy diet
- Hygiene
- Life extension
- Self-medication
- Nootropics
- Nutrients
- Nutrition
- Positive mental attitude
- Sleep hygiene
- Stress management
- Smoking cessation (quitting smoking)
- Vitamins
- Weight loss

=== Health maintenance of the masses ===
Health care

==== Health care industry ====
Health care industry

==== Public health ====
Public health

- Health observatory
- World Health Organization
- Category:Ministries of health
- Global health

==== Health science ====
Health science

- 10/90 gap
- Disease
- Medicine
- Sleep
- Stress (medicine)

== History of health ==
- Establishment of the World Health Organization
- History of medicine
- Life expectancy over human history
- History of anthrax
- History of antiretroviral therapy
- History of avian influenza
- History of cancer
- History of cholera
- History of drug resistance
- History of environmental health
- History of genetics
- History of health care reform
- History of HIV
- History of occupational safety and health
- History of pharmaceutical industry
- History of public health
- History of the healthcare industry
- History of toxicology

== Health education ==
=== Medical education ===
- Nursing school
- Medical school
  - List of medical schools
- School of public health
- Dental school
- Pharmacy school

== Health professionals ==
- List of clinical psychologists
- List of dentists
- List of dermatologists
- List of fictional medical examiners
- List of immunologists
- List of members of the National Academy of Sciences (medical genetics, hematology, and oncology)
- List of members of the National Academy of Sciences (medical physiology and metabolism)
- List of members of the National Academy of Sciences (physiology and pharmacology)
- List of members of the National Academy of Sciences (psychological and cognitive sciences)
- List of neurologists and neurosurgeons
- List of Nobel laureates in Physiology or Medicine
- List of nurses
- List of pathologists
- List of people in alternative medicine
- List of pharmacists
- List of physicians
- List of psychiatrists
- List of psychologists
  - List of psychologists on postage stamps

== Medical schools and colleges ==
=== General ===
- List of medical schools
- List of optometry schools
- List of osteopathic colleges
- List of pharmacy schools
- List of Seventh-day Adventist medical schools

=== Country specific ===
- List of dental schools in Australia
- List of medical schools in Australia
- List of medical colleges in Bangladesh
- List of medical schools in Canada
- List of medical schools in Egypt
- List of medical colleges in India
- List of colleges of nursing in the Philippines
- List of medical colleges in Rajasthan
- List of medical schools in Syria
- List of dental schools in the United Kingdom
- List of medical schools in the United Kingdom
  - List of historical medical schools in the United Kingdom
- List of pharmacy schools in the United Kingdom
- List of dental schools in the United States
- List of medical schools in the United States
  - List of medical specialty colleges in the United States

== See also ==
- Human enhancement
- Quality of life
