= Eye care professional =

Individual who provides a service related to the eyes or vision

An eye care professional is an individual who provides a service related to the eyes or vision. It is any healthcare worker involved in eye care, from one with a small amount of post-secondary training to practitioners with a doctoral level of education.

== Types ==
=== Ophthalmologist ===
Ophthalmology (/ˌɒfθælˈmɒlədʒi/ OFF-thal-MOL-ə-jee) is a surgical subspecialty within medicine that handles the diagnosis and treatment of eye disorders. Ophthalmologists are physicians (M.D./D.O/have a doctorate in medicine) that undergo subspecialty training in medical and surgical eye care. To become an ophthalmologist the provider must first become a physician. To become a physician, after college they must go through 4 years of medical and surgical training where they are extensively educated in treating all parts of the human anatomy, including the eye. Their training includes, but is not limited to, coursework (classroom, clinical, and community experiences) that covers science, the latest innovations in treatment and diagnosis, problem-solving and communication skills, prevention and care, professionalism, and medical ethics. After receiving the doctorate in medicine, the ophthalmologist completes 4 additional years of subspecialty training that includes an internship year, where they are exposed to broad clinical, hospital consultative and operative experiences in a variety of disciplines (subspecialties) covering every part of the eye including: cataract/anterior segment, cornea/external disease, glaucoma, neuro-ophthalmology/orbit, ocular pathology/oncology, oculoplastic/orbit, pediatric ophthalmology/strabismus, refractive management/intervention, retina/vitreous, and uveitis. Because of this training, ophthalmologists are the only physicians medically trained to manage the complete range of eye and vision care. After 8 years of post college education, about 40% of ophthalmologists choose to further subspecialize in a specific part of the eye, by completing 1-2 more years of fellowship training. Because of their extensive medical and surgical training, ophthalmologists can and do handle general eyecare, including but not limited to general eye exams, prescribing glasses and contact lenses, and dispensing medications (eye drops, oral or I.V. medications, including all scheduled substances). Because of their first hand knowledge and access to all medical and surgical facilities and imaging modalities (for example CT or MRI), they diagnose and treat eye conditions and diseases, and perform in office procedures such as lasers, out-patient surgeries such as cataract surgery and in hospital surgeries, such as extensive eye tumor removal. They are the only eye care provider with this extensive amount of medical and surgical training, as well as clinical expertise and exposure to all aspects of the eye, orbit, optic tract and visual cortex.

=== Ophthalmic medical practitioner ===
An ophthalmic medical practitioner is a physician who specializes in ophthalmic conditions but who has not completed a specialization in ophthalmology. This title only relates to providers in Europe.

=== Optometrist ===
Optometrists are healthcare professionals with a degree in eye care, specifically. In the United States and Canada, they are Doctors of Optometry (O.D.) - this includes optical, medical and some surgical eye care. Their training typically includes four years of college followed by four years of eye specific training (Optometry school). Some complete an additional 5th year in a specialty area. Optometry school is a specialized program - specific to the eyes and related structures. Optometrists receive their medical eye training while in Optometry school and during internships (hospitals, private practices, universities, VA's etc.). Education is provided by professors, optometrists and physicians. Often, Optometry students and Ophthalmology residents will work together to co-manage medical cases. O.D.'s are trained and licensed to manage any eye disease (infections, glaucoma, macular degeneration, etc.) and practice medicine for eye related conditions - including topical medications (eye drops) or those taken by mouth including some schedule controlled substances. They may also order imaging tests (CT/MRI), remove ocular foreign bodies and perform some laser procedures. They are also qualified to perform some surgical procedures. Optometrists have the most optical training of any eye care professional and are the only eye care providers with a degree specific to eye care.

In the United States, Optometrists in some cases are considered doctors within their scope of practice and bill medical insurances according to Medicare.

Outside of the United States and Canada, Optometrists typically do not hold a doctorate degree and may be limited in providing surgical treatments. However, some countries such as the UK, include a combination of providers where some Optometrists hold postgraduate doctorate degrees and some do not.

=== Orthoptist ===
Orthoptists specialize in diagnosis and management of eye movement and coordination problems, misalignment of the visual axis, convergence and accommodation problems, and conditions such as amblyopia, strabismus, and binocular vision disorders, as outlined by the International Orthoptic Association. They may assist ophthalmologists in surgery, teach orthoptic students, students of other allied health professions, medical students, and ophthalmology residents and fellows, act as vision researchers, perform vision screening, perform low vision assessments and act as clinical administrators.

=== Ocularist ===
Ocularists specialize in the fabrication and fitting of ocular prostheses for people who have lost eyes due to trauma or illness.

=== Optician ===
Opticians specialize in the fitting and fabrication of ophthalmic lenses, spectacles, contact lenses, low vision aids and ocular prosthetics. They may also be referred to as an "optical dispenser", "dispensing optician", "ophthalmic dispenser". The prescription for the corrective lenses must be supplied by an ophthalmologist, optometrist or in some countries an orthoptist. This is a regulated profession in most jurisdictions.

=== Ophthalmic medical personnel ===
A collective term for allied health personnel in ophthalmology. It is often used to refer to specialized personnel (unlike ocularists or opticians). In many countries these allied personnel may just be known as an "ophthalmic assistant". Their training is usually combined with a two or three year applied science degree and they assist an ophthalmologist or optometrist in the hospital or clinic with vision testing.

In the USA the Joint Commission on Allied Health Personnel in Ophthalmology administers OMP certifications:

=== Oculist ===
Oculist is an older term that was primarily used to describe eye care professionals that are trained and specialized in the eye care field, specifically ophthalmologists and optometrists. The term is no longer used in the United States.

=== Vision therapist ===
A vision therapist, usually either an orthoptist or optometrist, works with patients that require vision therapy, such as low vision patients. Commonly, vision therapy is performed in children who develop problems with their vision mostly because they are using their eyes up close. This type of therapy is however generally used in patients who need visual correction but for whom the corrective lenses are not enough to reverse the condition. Visual therapy in children is performed by optometrists who specialize in children's eye care. To specialize in vision therapy, doctors must complete extensive post-graduate training beyond their optometric degree, at which time they are eligible to sit for their national boards to become fully certified as specialists in children's vision. A doctor's title after passing the national board in vision therapy is Fellow in the College of Optometrists in Vision Development, or F.C.O.V.D. Optometrists who provide vision therapy but who have not yet sat for their certification exams are board-eligible Associates in the College of Optometrists in Vision Development. Vision therapists typically use prisms, eye patches, filtered lenses, and computerized systems to conduct therapy sessions.

Most eye care professionals do not practice iridology, citing a significant lack of scientific evidence for the practice.

== Distinction between ophthalmologists, optometrists and orthoptists ==
Ophthalmologists generally provide specialty eye care and manage late stage eye disease (often only mitigated with surgery).

Optometrists typically provide comprehensive eye care - including medical, up to a moderate stage (managed with prescription medications). There is considerable overlap in scope of practice between professions. Optometrists are licensed to provide exactly the same medical care as ophthalmologists, but not invasive surgery.

Orthoptists specialize in the diagnosis and management of problems with eye movement and coordination, such as misalignment of the visual axis, binocular vision problems, and pre/post surgical care of strabismus patients. They do not directly treat ocular disease with medications or surgery. Orthoptists are trained to treat patients using optical aids and eye exercises. Orthoptists are primarily found working alongside ophthalmologists and optometrists to co-manage binocular vision treatment, visual field loss management and accommodative therapy. They often do standard eye and vision testing along with computerised axillary testing.

All three types of professional perform screenings for common ocular problems affecting children (such as amblyopia and strabismus) and adults (such as cataracts, glaucoma, and diabetic retinopathy). All are required to participate in ongoing continuing education courses to maintain licensure and stay current on the latest standards of care.

== See also ==
- American Academy of Ophthalmology
- American Academy of Optometry
- American Association for Pediatric Ophthalmology and Strabismus
- American Optometric Association
- British Optical Association
- College of Optometrists
- College of Optometrists in Vision Development
- International Orthoptic Association
- Irish College of Ophthalmologists
- Joint Commission on Allied Health Personnel in Ophthalmology
- Optometric Extension Program
- Royal College of Ophthalmologists
- The Institute of Optometry
- World Council of Optometry
- Worshipful Company of Spectacle Makers
