= List of optometry schools =

The following list of optometry schools covers many countries, although the list is not exhaustive. Internationally, optometry as a profession includes different levels of education. The institutions listed below provide academic and professional education and clinical training that ranges from Doctor of Optometry degree level to other professional degrees in optometry and also non-degree level education leading to a diploma or other qualifications in optometry.

In many countries the role of optometry is statutorily defined, practice is regulated and there is uniformity in professional education and clinical training and the scope of practice is consistent with the definition of optometry as a profession. In such countries the nomenclature of terminal qualification may be reviewed as and when necessary. In Australia, for example, Doctor of Optometry (OD) is now established at University of Melbourne (first intake 2011) and OD is described as "an internationally recognised qualification and the gold standard for optometry education."

== Australia ==
- Deakin University - Bachelor of Vision Science, Master of Optometry
- Flinders University Bachelor of Medical Science (Vision Science), Master of Optometry
- Queensland University of Technology - BAppSc (Optom) - replaced with Bachelor of Vision Science / Master of Optometry from February 2009
- University of Canberra - Bachelor of Vision Science, Master of Optometry
- University of Melbourne - OD
- University of New South Wales - Bachelor of Vision Science/Master of Clinical Optometry
- University of Western Australia - Doctor of Optometry

== Bangladesh ==
- 4 Years Bachelor of Science in optometry (B. Optom) course in Institute of Community Ophthalmology, Chittagong Medical University since 2010 www.icoedu.org

== Brazil ==
- Universidade do Contestado, as a partner of Fundación Universitaria San Martín, of Bogotá, Colombia

== Bulgaria ==
- Sofia University St. Kliment Ohridski

== Canada ==
- Université de Montréal, Québec
- University of Waterloo School of Optometry and Vision Science, Ontario

== Colombia ==
- Fundación Universitaria del Area Andina, Pereira and Bogotá
- Fundación Universitaria San Martín, Bogotá
- Universidad Antonio Nariño, Bogotá
- Universidad de La Salle, Bogotá - Master in Vision Science
- Universidad del Bosque, Bogotá
- Universidad Metropolitana, Barranquilla
- Universidad Santo Tomás, Bucaramanga

== Czech Republic ==
- Czech Technical University, Prague
- Masaryk University, Brno
- Palacký University, Olomouc

== Oman ==
- 4 Years Degree Program in Optometry (B. Optom) university of Buraimi .

== Ecuador ==
- Universidad Metropolitana, Quito

== El Salvador ==
- Universidad de El Salvador, San Salvador - Licenciado en Optometría

== France ==
- Institut des Sciences de la Vision, St Etienne
- Institut d'optique Graduate School, Paris - ISO
- Paris-Saclay University, Orsay
- Progress Santé, Paris Nice Lyon

== Ghana ==
- Kwame Nkrumah University of Science and Technology - Doctor of Optometry
- University of Cape Coast - Doctor of Optometry

== Greece ==
Technological Educational Institute of Athens, Department of Optics and Optometry

== Hong Kong ==
- The Hong Kong Polytechnic University

== Hungary ==
Semmelweis University, Faculty of Health Sciences - Optometry within Medical Diagnostic Analysis Bsc

== India ==
At present there are more than fifty schools of optometry in India. In 1958, two schools of optometry were established, one at Gandhi Eye Hospital, Aligarh in Uttar Pradesh and the other at Sarojini Devi Eye Hospital, Hyderabad in Andhra Pradesh, under the second five-year plan by Director General of Health Services of Government of India. These schools offered diplomas in optometry courses of two years duration validated by state medical faculties. Subsequently, four more schools were opened across India at Sitapur Eye Hospital, Sitapur in Uttar Pradesh, Chennai (formerly Madras) in Tamil Nadu, Bengalooru (formerly Bangalore) in Karnataka, and Regional Institute of Ophthalmology (Govt medical college), Thiruvananthapuram (formerly Trivandrum) in Kerala.

The Elite School of Optometry (ESO) was established in 1985 at Chennai and was the first to offer a four-year degree course. This was followed by All India institute of Medical Sciences, New Delhi and in Kerala, Regional Institute of Ophthalmology (Govt Medical college), Thiruvananthapuram (formerly Trivandrum) is the first government colleges to offer a bachelor's degree in optometry in 2010; were considered as the best in excellence from Govt. of India.

The following list includes educational institutions offering four year degree courses, two or three year diploma courses and also non-degree courses. Post-graduate education in optometry is also offered in India leading to M.Optom, M.Sc. and Ph.D. by several universities.

- Aarupadai Veedu Medical College, Pondicherry (B.Optom & M.Optom)
- Al Salama College of Optometry, Perinthalmanna, Calicut, Kannur, All in Kerala and Coimbatore, Tamil Nadu (BSc in optometry)
- All India Institute of Optometrical Sciences (Academic Wing of Indian Optical Institute and Refraction Hospital Trust), Kolkata, West Bengal
- IIMT University, Meerut
- Amity University, Gurgaon, Haryana (B.Optom, M.Optom - Full time, Practitioner & PhD)
- Advanced College of Optometry & Health Sciences, Sanpada, Navi Mumbai
- Bareilly Institute of ParaMedical Sciences & S.S. Hospital, Bareilly, Uttar Pradesh
- Bharati Vidyapeeth University, Medical College, School of Optometry, Pune, Maharashtra
- Brien Holden Institute of Optometry and Vision Sciences, LVPEI, Hyderabad (B.Optom and PhD)
- Rayhan Eye hospital and Institute of Optometry, Edappal, Triprayar, Kondotty, Tirur All in Kerala and Coimbatore, Tamil Nadu (BSc in optometry)
- Bharatimaiya College of Optometry, Surat, Gujrat
- Brainware University, Kolkata, West Bengal
- Dr. Anand College of Optometry and Vision Science, Salem, Tamil Nadu
- Dr. DY Patil Institute of Optometry & Visual Science (Deemed) University Maharashtra
- Dr. N.T.R. University Of Health Sciences Vijayawada, Andhra Pradesh
- Elite School of Optometry, Chennai, Tamil Nadu
- FAHS (Faculty of Allied Health Sciences), Vinayaka Missions Research Foundation, Salem Tamil Nadu
- Govt. Medical college Kozhikode
- George college of management and science
- Himalayan University, Arunachal Pradesh
- IGNOU (Central University), Delhi
- ITM Institute of Health Science, (Deemed) University, Mumbai, Maharastra
- ITM Vocational University, Vadodara, Gujarat
- Jadhavpur University, Kolkata, West Bengal
- Jamia Hamdard (Deemed) University, Delhi
- Jankalyan Eye Hospital Educational and research Institute, Lucknow, Uttar Pradesh
- J.R.N. Rajasthan vidyapeeth (Deemed) University, Rajasthan
- Kalyani University, Kolkata, West Bengal
- Kerala University of Health and Allied sciences.
- Laxmi College of Optometry, Mumbai, Maharastra
- Lotus College of Optometry, Mumbai, Maharastra
- Madurai Kamraj University, Tamil Nadu
- Manipal University, Manipal, Karnataka
- Martin Luther King University, Shillog, Meghalaya
- Municipal Eye Hospital, School of Optometry, Mumbai, Maharastra
- Nagar school of Optometry, Gujarat University, Ahmedabad, Gujrat
- Netaji Subhash Institute of Optometry, Mumbai
- Netrajyothi college of Health Science (Optometry), Bangalore, Karnataka
- NIMS University, Rajasthan
- NSHM College of Management & Technology, NSHM Knowledge Campus, Durgapur, West Bengal
- NSHM Knowledge Campus, Kolkata, West Bengal
- Rabindra Bharti University, Kolkata, West Bengal
- Regional Institute of Ophthalmology, Thiruvananthapuram, Kerala
- RGUHS, Karnataka
- Sankara College of Optometry, Bangalore, Karnataka
- Sankara College of Optometry, Ludhiana, Punjab
- Sharda University, Greater Noida, Uttar Pradesh
- Shri Ganpati Netralaya College of Optometry, Jalna, Maharastra
- Dr. Agarwals Institute of Optometry (a unit of Dr. Agarwal's Eye Hospital), Chennai, Tamil Nadu
- Shri Rajaram Memorial Eye Hospital, Optometry research & Training Institute, Banda, Uttar Pradesh
- Shri Vaishnav Polytechnic College, Indore
- Sri Ramchandra University, Porur, Tamil Nadu
- Srimanta Sankaradeva University of Health Science, Assam
- SRM University, Chennai, Tamil Nadu
- Susruta School of Optometry & Visual Sciences, Cochin, Kerala
- The Tamil Nadu Dr.M.G.R Medical University Chennai, Tamil Nadu
- Tripura University, Agartala, Tripura
- School of Allied Health Sciences, Vinayaka Missions Research Foundation, Chennai Campus, Chennai, Tamil Nadu.
- School of Medical sciences, University of Hyderabad, Telangana.
- University of Mumbai, Maharashtra
- Uttrakhand University, Uttrakhand
- Vasan Institute of Ophthalmology and Research, Chennai, Tamil Nadu
- Vasan Institute of Ophthalmology and Research, Coimbatore, Tamil Nadu
- Vasan Institute of Ophthalmology and Research, Salem, Tamil Nadu
- Veer Narmad South Gujrat University, Surat, Gujrat
- Vidyasagar College of Optometry and Vision Science, Kolkata, West Bengal
- Vinayaka Missions Medical College, Karaikal, Pondicherry
- West Bengal University of technology, Kolkata, West Bengal
- Yashwantrao Chavan Maharashtra Open University (YCMOU), Nasik, Maharashtra

== Iran ==
- Iran University of Medical Sciences, Tehran
- Mashhad University of Medical Sciences, Mashhad
- Shahid Beheshti University of Medical Sciences, Tehran
- Zahedan University of Medical Sciences, Zahedan

Mazandaran university of medical science دانشگاه علوم پزشکی مازندران

== Ireland ==
- Dublin Institute of Technology, Dublin - BSc in Optometry

== Israel ==
- Bar-Ilan University
- Hadassah College

== Italy ==
Currently there are seven state universities (in Milano, Padova, Lecce, Roma, Firenze, Napoli, and Torino) offering three-year university degrees in optics and optometry (Ottica e Optometria), formally a kind of a physics degree.

- University of Florence
- University of Milano-Bicocca
- University of Padua, Italy
- University of Naples Federico II
- University of Roma Tre
- University of Salento
- University of Turin

Optometry education in Italy starts in 1969–70. Some post-secondary non-university courses are currently active (2020). Their program can be accessed only by licensed opticians. Some of the more appreciated schools are:

- IRSOO, Vinci, Florence
- IBZ, Bologna
- Fermi, Perugia
- SIOO, Florence

== Latvia ==
- University of Latvia, Riga, Latvia - bachelor's and master's degrees

== Lebanon ==
- American University of Science and Technology
- Lebanese University, Faculty of Public Health
- Institut Technique Industriel Supérieur
- Modern University for Business and Science

== Malaysia ==
- International Islamic University Malaysia
- International University College of Technology Twintech
- Management & Science University
- National Institute of Ophthalmic Sciences
- SEGi University College
- Universiti Kebangsaan Malaysia
- Universiti Teknologi MARA
- UCSI University

== Mexico ==
- National Polytechnic Institute, Unidad Santo Tomas and Unidad Milpa Alta
- Universidad Nacional Autónoma de México
- Universidad Autónoma de Aguascalientes - Mestría en Ciencias Biomédicas Area de Optometria
- Universidad Autónoma de Ciudad Juárez
- Universidad Xochicalco, Campus Ensenada and Campus Tijuana

== Nepal ==
- Tribhuwan University, B.P. Koirala Lions Centre for Ophthalmic Studies, Maharajgunj Medical Campus - four-year bachelor's degree program only, with no post-graduate programs available
- National Academy of Medical Sciences (NAMS) Bir Hospital has launched "Bachelor in Optometry and Vision Science" program in 2018. It is a four years program and the total quota for the enrollment is 40 only.

== The Netherlands ==
- University of Applied Sciences Utrecht

== New Zealand ==
- School of Optometry and Vision Science - BOptom
- University of Auckland

== Nigeria ==
There are seven schools offering the O.D. (Doctor of Optometry) degree.

- Abia State University Uturu, Abia State - also offers MSc and PhD programmes in Clinical Optometry in combination with FNCO
- Bayero University, Kano, Kano State
- Federal University of Technology Owerri
- Imo State University, Owerri, Imo State
- Madonna University Okija, Anambra State
- University of Benin, Ugbowo, Benin-City, Edo State, Nigeria - also offers MSc programmes in vision science
- University of Ilorin, Kwara State.

== Norway ==
- Buskerud University College

== Pakistan ==
- College of Ophthalmology and Allied Vision science, KEMU, Lahore
- Fatima Memorial College of Medicine and Dentistry, Lahore
- Isra School of Optometry, Isra University, Karachi
- University of Lahore, Islamabad Campus, Islamabad
- Superior University Lahore
- Munawar Memorial Hospital & College of Optometry, Chakwal
- Pakistan Institute of Community Ophthalmology, Peshawar
- Pakistan Institute of Ophthalmology, Al-Shifa Trust Eye Hospital, Rawalpindi
- Pakistan Institute of Rehabilitation Science, (PIRS) ISRA University Islamabad Campus, Islamabad
- Basheer Institute of Medical Sciences, Bara Khau, Islamabad
- Pef University College, Peshawar
- Rashid Latif Medical College
- Rawalpindi Medical College, Rawalpindi
- The University of Faisalabad
- University of Lahore, Department of Optometry and Vision Sciences (DOVS), Lahore

== Philippines ==
- Cebu Doctors' University
- Centro Escolar University
- Davao Doctors' College
- Emilio Aguinaldo College
- Lyceum-Northwestern University
- Manila Central University
- Mindanao Medical Foundation College
- National University - Mall of Asia
- Southwestern University (Philippines)
- LPU-St. Cabrini School of Health Sciences, Inc.

== Poland ==
- Adam Mickiewicz University
- Poznan University of Medical Sciences
- University of Warsaw
- Wrocław University of Technology
- Nicolaus Copernicus University Ludwik Rydygier Collegium Medicum in Bydgoszcz

== Portugal ==
- University of Beira Interior
- University of Minho
- Instituto Superior de Educação e Ciências
- ESCOLA PORTUGUESA DE ÓPTICA OCULAR - UPOOP

== Russia ==
- The Helmholtz Research Institute for Eye Diseases
- Saint Petersburg Medical Technical College

== Saudi Arabia ==
- King Saud University, Riyadh - Doctor of Optometry (OD) and master's degree in Vision Science
- Qassim University, Buraidah, Al-Qassim - Doctor of optometry (OD)

== Singapore ==
- Ngee Ann Polytechnic

In 2009 University of Manchester (UK) and Singapore Polytechnic set up a degree course in optometry within the premises of Singapore Polytechnic. The degree is not recognised by the General Optical Council (GOC) in the United Kingdom. This course has since been stopped due to staffing issues.

- Singapore Polytechnic

== South Africa ==
- University of the Free State, Free State,
- University of Johannesburg, Gauteng,
- University of KwaZulu-Natal, Kwazulu Natal,
- University of Limpopo, Limpopo,

4 Year bachelor's degrees including clinical optometry

== Sri Lanka ==
School of Ophthalmic Technology, established in 1983 by the Ministry of Health at National Eye Hospital Colombo with the initiation of Dr. C E Parker III., honours the diploma in ophthalmic technology. However, a degree program does not exist. These ophthalmic technologists are trained for government hospitals.

Optometry courses are conducted by private institutes such as Sri Lanka Optometric Association, Eye Care Institute, and Vision Care Academy.

However, the government of Sri Lanka does not recognize optometry as a profession and has no regulations to date.

== Sudan ==
- Al-Neelain University - 5-year bachelor'sFaculty of optometry and visual sciences

Established in 1954 as institute of optometry in Khartoum eye hospital. Joined ministry of Higher Education in 1986 as the High Institute of Optometry, and lastly was annexed to Alneelain University in 1997 when it was re- named to become Faculty of Optometry and Visual Sciences (FOVS).

Currently FOVS has the following programs:

1- BSc optometry in 5 years 2. BSc in ophthalmic technology in 4years. 3. BSc in optical dispensary in 4 years 2- Diploma in ophthalmic technology in 3 years. 3- Diploma in optical dispensary in 3 years.

FOVS also offers MSc and PhD degrees in optometry with sub- specialization in either binocular vision, contact lenses, ocular photography, neurology of vision, low vision, primary eye care and pediatric optometry

FOVS is the only of its kind in Sudan and is the first in Middle East and Africa .

In 2010, Alneelain University Eye Hospital was established as part of FOVS to expand training capacity and to serve community.

Ibnsina university 4-year bachelor'sFaculty of optometry and visual sciences Makka eye college 4-year bachelor'sFaculty of optometry and visual sciences University of Western Kordufan University 4-year bachelor's Faculty of optometry and visual sciences

== Sweden ==
- Karolinska Institutet - 3-year bachelor's degree in optometry and a one-year master program in clinical Optometry.
- Linnaeus University, Kalmar - 3-year bachelor's degree in optometry

== Switzerland ==
- University of Applied Sciences Northwestern Switzerland - Institute of Optometry

== Taiwan ==
There are currently seven universities offering a bachelor's degree in optometry and four educational institutions offering an associate degree in optometry:

- Asia University
- University of Kang Ning
- Central Taiwan University of Science and Technology
- Chung Hwa University of Medical Technology
- Dayeh University
- Yuanpei University of Medical Technology
- Chung Shan Medical University
- Mackay Junior College of Medicine, Nursing and Management
- Hsin Sheng College of Medical Care and Management
- Jen-Teh Junior College of Medicine, Nursing, and Management
- Shu-Zen College of Medicine and Management

== Thailand ==
- Naresuan University
- Ramkhamhaeng University
- Rangsit University
- Thammasart University

== Trinidad & Tobago ==
- University of the West Indies, St. Augustine Campus

== United Kingdom ==
There are 12 educational institutions in the United Kingdom offering degrees in optometry. Nine are located in England with one optometry school in each of Northern Ireland, Wales and Scotland. Additionally, in England, the Institute of Optometry offers a post-graduate professional doctorate (Doctor of Optometry degree) in partnership with London South Bank University. The Doctor of Optometry postgraduate degree is also offered at Aston University, Birmingham. The Aston Doctor of Optometry includes academic modules in independent pharmaceutical prescribing, alongside advanced optometry modules in glaucoma, retinal/macular disease, myopia and many others.

=== England ===
- Anglia Ruskin University, Cambridge
- City, University of London
- University of Aston, Birmingham
- University of Bradford
- University of Hertfordshire
- University of Manchester
- University of Plymouth
- University of Portsmouth
- University of the West of England, Bristol
- University of Huddersfield

=== Wales ===
- Cardiff University

=== Scotland ===
- Glasgow Caledonian University

=== Northern Ireland ===
- University of Ulster, Coleraine campus

== United States ==
Twenty-three American educational institutions offer the Doctor of Optometry degree.

- AL: University of Alabama at Birmingham
- AZ: Midwestern University Arizona College of Optometry, Glendale
- CA: Southern California College of Optometry at Marshall B. Ketchum University
- CA: University of California, Berkeley
- CA: Western University of Health Sciences
- FL: Nova Southeastern University
- IL: Illinois College of Optometry
- IL: Midwestern University Chicago College of Optometry, Downers Grove
- IN: Indiana University
- KY: University of Pikeville - Kentucky College of Optometry
- MA: Massachusetts College of Pharmacy and Health Sciences
- MA: New England College of Optometry
- MI: Michigan College of Optometry at Ferris State University
- MI: School of Optometry at the University of Detroit Mercy in Detroit, Michigan
- MO: University of Missouri at St. Louis
- NY: State University of New York in New York City
- OH: Ohio State University
- OK: Northeastern State University Oklahoma College of Optometry
- OR: Pacific University, Forest Grove
- PA: Salus University, Pennsylvania College of Optometry
- PR: Interamerican University of Puerto Rico, School of Optometry
- TN: Southern College of Optometry
- TX: University of Houston
- TX: University of the Incarnate Word
- UT: Rocky Mountain University of Health Professions

== See also ==
- List of medical schools
- List of dental schools in the United States
