= List of colleges of nursing in the Philippines =

This is a list of nursing schools in the Philippines.

A

- Adamson University
- Adventist Medical Center College – Iligan (formerly Mindanao Sanitarium and Hospital College)
- Ago Foundation College - Naga City
- Ago Medical and Educational Center - Legazpi, Albay
- Amando Cope College - Tabaco City, Albay
- Angeles University Foundation
- Aklan State University(School of Arts and Sciences)- Banga, Aklan
- University of Santo Tomas-Legazpi - Legazpi, Albay
- Araullo University - Cabanatuan
- Arellano University College of Nursing
- Asian College of Technology
- Asia Pacific College of Advanced Studies
- Ateneo de Davao University
- Ateneo de Naga University
- Ateneo de Zamboanga University

B

- Baguio Central University
- Baliuag University College of Nursing
- Bataan Peninsula State University
- Benguet State University
- Bicol College - Legazpi, Albay
- Bicol University - Legazpi, Albay
- Brokenshire College
- Bukidnon State University
- Bulacan State University

C

- Capitol Medical Center Colleges
- Cebu Doctors' University
- Cebu Institute of Technology
- Cebu Normal University
- Cebu Sacred Heart College - Cebu City
- Cebu Technological University (CTU) - Cebu City Medical Center College of Nursing
- Central Philippine University - The first nursing school - started in 1906 and produced the first 3 graduates in 1909.
- Centro Escolar University
- Chinese General Hospital College of Nursing
- Christ the King College
- Colegio de San Lorenzo Ruiz de Manila of Northern Samar, Inc. - Catarman, Northern Samar
- Colegio de Kidapawan
- Cor Jesu College

D

- Davao Doctors College
- Davao Medical School Foundation
- De La Salle Medical and Health Sciences Institute
- De La Salle Lipa
- Dominican College of Santa Rosa
- Dr. Carlos S. Lanting College

E

- Emilio Aguinaldo College

F

- Far Eastern University Institute of Nursing
- Father Saturnino Urios University - Butuan
- Fernandez College of Arts and Technology
- Our Lady of Fatima University

G

- Global City Innovative College
- Dr. Gloria D. Lacson College - San Leonardo, Nueva Ecija
- Good Samaritan Colleges Cabanatuan

H

- Holy Child College of Butuan
- Holy Infant College College of Nursing - Tacloban
- Holy Name University College of Nursing - Tagbilaran, Bohol

I

- Ifugao State College (ISCAF)
- Iloilo Doctors College
- Immaculate Conception College Albay
- Immaculate Conception College Cabanatuan

J

- Jose C. Feliciano College
- Jose Rizal University College of Nursing

K

- Kester Grant College

L

- La Salle University (Ozamiz City)
- La Fortuna College Cabanatuan
- Liceo de Cagayan University
- Lorma Colleges
- Lourdes College
- Lyceum Institute of Technology - Laguna
- Lyceum of Batangas
- Lyceum of the Philippines University - Manila
- Lyceum - St. Cabrini College of Allied Medicine - Batangas

M

- Manila Adventist Medical Center and Colleges
- Manila Central University
- Manila Tytana Colleges - formerly Manila Doctors College
- Mariano Marcos State University
- Mati Doctors College
- Metropolitan Medical Center College of Arts, Science and Technology (formerly Metropolitan Hospital College of Nursing)
- Mindanao Medical Foundation College
- Mindanao State University
- Mindanao State University at Naawan
- Mindanao State University–General Santos
- Mindanao State University–Iligan Institute of Technology
- Mindanao State University–Zamboanga Sibugay
- Misamis University
- Mountain View College

N

- Naga College Foundation - Naga City
- New Era University
- Northeastern College - Santiago City
- North Valley College
- Notre Dame of Dadiangas University
- Notre Dame of Jolo College - Jolo, Sulu
- Notre Dame of Kidapawan College
- Notre Dame of Marbel University
- Notre Dame University (Philippines)
- Nueva Ecija Doctors College - Cabanatuan
- Nueva Ecija University of Science and Technology - Cabanatuan
- Notre Dame of Midsayap College- The First Notre Dame School in Asia

O

- Olivarez College
- Our Lady of Fatima University
- Our Lady of the Pillar Colleges - Cauayan, Isabela

P

- Pamantasan ng Lungsod ng Maynila College of Nursing
- Pamantasan ng Lungsod ng Marikina College of Health Sciences
- Pamantasan ng Cabuyao
- Philippine Rehabilitation Institute Foundation, Inc.
- Philippine College of Health Sciences, Inc.
- Pines City Colleges
- Polytechnic College of Davao del Sur
- Province of Negros Occidental-Northern Negros State College of Science and Technology School of Nursing

R

- Doña Remedios Trinidad Romualdez Medical Foundation - Tacloban
- Remedios Trinidad Romualdez Memorial Schools, Inc. - Makati Medical Center

S

- San Juan De Dios Educational Foundation, Inc.
- San Pedro College
- St. Anthony's College - Antique - The first nursing school in Antique
- St. Ferdinand College - Ilagan, Isabela
- St. Joseph College Cavite City
- Saint Louis University, Baguio City
- St. Luke's College of Nursing, Trinity University of Asia
- Saint Mary's College of Tagum
- Saint Mary's University
- St. Paul University Iloilo
- St. Paul University Philippines
- Silliman University
- Southern Luzon State University
- South Philippine Adventist College
- Southville International School and Colleges
- Southwestern University (Philippines) - Cebu City
- STI College San Pablo - College of Nursing
- Systems Plus College Foundation

T

- Tabaco College - Tabaco City, Albay
- Tanchuling College - Legazpi City, Albay
- Tarlac State University
- Tomas Claudio Memorial College
- Tomas del Rosario College

U

- Universidad de Manila
- Universidad de Sta. Isabel
- Universidad de Zamboanga
- University of Baguio
- University of Batangas
- University of Cebu - College of Nursing (formerly Chong Hua Hospital - School of Nursing) - Lapu-Lapu and Mandaue Campus
- University of Iloilo
- University of La Salette - College of Nursing
- University of Mindanao Digos Campus
- University of Perpetual Help System Dalta - Molino
- University of San Agustin
- University of San Carlos
- University of San Jose-Recoletos
- University of Southeastern Mindanao
- University of Southern Philippines Foundation - College of Nursing, Cebu City
- University of Saint La Salle
- University of Santo Tomas College of Nursing
- University of the Cordilleras
- UERMMMC College of Nursing
- University of the Immaculate Conception
- University of the Philippines Manila
- University of the Visayas - Gullas Medical Center

V

- Visayas State University - Baybay City, Leyte

W

- West Visayas State University
- Wesleyan University (Philippines) - Cabanatuan

X

- Xavier University – Ateneo de Cagayan

== Defunct nursing schools ==
This is a list of defunct nursing schools in the Philippines.

I

- Iligan Capitol College

L

- La Salle College
- Lyceum of Iligan Foundation

M

- Medina College - Pagadian
- Medina College - Ozamiz
- Medina College - Ipil
- Mother College

N

- North Central Mindanao College

S

- Saint Michael's College
