= International Orthoptic Association =

The International Orthoptic Association represents over 20,000 orthoptists, in over 20 countries.

== History ==
The International Orthoptic Association was formed in 1967 after the first International Orthoptic Congress. The British Orthoptic Association were the founding members.

== Registration and licensing ==
Orthoptists are required to be licensed by their respective countries. Many countries also require them to undertake continuing professional education.

== Professional work ==
Orthoptists are part of the eye care professional team. They primarily work alongside ophthalmologists, in the co-management of strabismus and binocular vision disorders, such as amblyopia.

Orthoptists are involved in international research, while some are employed (particularly in the US and Canada) to teach ophthalmology residents standard orthoptic care, vision therapy and ocular sonography practice.

== See also ==
- Amblyopia
- Eye care professional
- Eyepatch
- Optometry
- Orthoptist
- Pediatric ophthalmology
- Strabismus
- Vision therapy
