= University of Salento =

Italian university

Coordinates: 40°21′29″N 18°09′53″E

- Università del Salento
- Type: State-supported
- Established: 1955
- Rector: Prof. Fabio Pollice
- Students: 18,398 (2020–2021)
- Location: Lecce, Italy
- Campus: Ecotekne and Cittadella della Ricerca
- Sports teams: CUS Lecce
- Website: unisalento.it international.unisalento.it

The University of Salento (Italian: Università del Salento, called until 2007 Università degli Studi di Lecce) is a university located in Lecce, Italy. It was founded in 1955 by Giuseppe Codacci Pisanelli.

The university of Salento commenced activities in the academic year 1955–1956 under the "Salentine University Council". In 1960, it became the "Free University of Lecce" and passed to Government authority in the 1967–1968 academic year.

Since 2005, the University of Salento is a partner of the Euro-Mediterranean Center for Climate Change (CMCC).

University of Salento is ranked 251–275 among the top world's university and fifth in Italy, according to the Times Higher Education World University Rankings released on 2015. In 2018, it was ranked 501–600, according to the Times Higher Education World University Rankings.

== Organization and Programmes ==
The university is divided into 8 departments, which offer the following programmes:

=== Department of Biological and Environmental Sciences and Technologies ===
- Bachelor's Programmes:
  - Biology
  - Biotechnology
  - Environmental Sciences and Technologies
  - Viticulture and Oenology
  - Motor and sport sciences
  - Sustainable development under changing climate
  - Nursing
- Master's Programmes:
  - Experimental and applied biology
  - Coastal and Marine Biology and Ecology (taught in English)
  - Environmental Sciences
  - Medical Biotechnology and Nanobiotechnology
  - Sciences and techniques of preventive and adapted physical activities
- Unique cycle master's degree
  - Medicine and surgery

=== Department of Cultural Heritage ===
- Bachelor's Programmes:
  - Cultural Heritage
  - Discipline of performing arts and music
- Master's Programmes:
  - Archeology
  - History of art
  - Sciences of performing arts and audiovisual production
  - Digital humanities (taught in English)

=== Department of Economics Sciences ===
- Bachelor's Programmes:
  - Business economics
  - Economics and finance
  - Management of tourism organizations
  - Digital management
- Master's Programmes:
  - Business management
  - Economics, finance and insurance
  - Tourist and cultural entities management

=== Department of Human and Social Sciences ===
- Bachelor's Programmes:
  - Political Science And International Relations
  - Psychological Science and Techniques
  - Social Service
  - Sociology
  - Socio-Cultural Educator
- Master's Programmes:
  - Pedagogical Counseling and Planning Of Educational Processes
  - Planning and Management Of Social Policies and Services
  - Primary Education Sciences (five years)
  - Methodology of The Psychological Intervention
  - Geopolitical and International Studies
  - Sociology and Social Research

=== Department of Humanities ===
- Bachelor's Programmes:
  - Communication Sciences
  - Foreign Languages, Cultures and Literatures
  - Literature
  - Philosophy
  - Language Mediation
- Master's Programmes:
  - Classical Literature
  - Modern Literature
  - Modern Languages, literature and Translation
  - Philosophical Sciences
  - Public, Economic and Institutional Communication
  - Technical Translation and Interpreting

=== Department of Engineering for Innovation ===
- Bachelor's Programmes:
  - Civil Engineering
  - Industrial Engineering (Cittadella della ricerca campus)
  - Industrial Engineering (Ecotekne campus)
  - Information Engineering
  - Biomedical engineering
  - Engineering for sustainable industry
- Master's Programmes:
  - Aerospace Engineering (taught in English)
  - Civil Engineering
  - Communication Engineering and Electronic Technologies (taught in English)
  - Computer Engineering (taught in English)
  - Management Engineering (taught in English)
  - Materials Engineering and Nanotechnology (taught in English)
  - Mechanical Engineering

=== Department of Law Studies ===
- Bachelor's degree
  - Sports law and management
- Master's degree
  - Euro-Mediterranean migration policies and governance
- Unique cycle master's degree
  - Law (five years)

=== Department of Mathematics and Physics "Ennio De Giorgi" ===
- Bachelor's Programmes:
  - Mathematics
  - Optics and Optometry
  - Physics
- Master's Programmes:
  - Mathematics
  - Physics

== Sports, clubs, and traditions ==
The University Sports Centre (in Italian Centro Universitario Sportivo - CUS) houses all the sporting activities that take place for enrolled students at the University of Salento.

All courses are taught by qualified and nationally certified instructors including a variety of disciplines, gymnastics, volleyball, basketball, aerobics, funky, tennis, fencing, Latin American dance, swimming, aqua gym, body building, step, and breathing training.

Body building can be found at the "Mario Stasi" sports centre in Via Vincenzo Cuoco, and there are also agreements with local swimming pools.

The CUS takes part annually in the Italian University Games and appears annually on the list of National University Champions demonstrating a high level of participation. In addition to this the CUS Lecce also organises a series of game competitions, with individual end of course tournaments and le Cussiardi.

Also for student members, it's also possible to take part in winter and summer camps with agreements with C.U.S.I. It possible to do alpine ski-ing, ski jumping snowboarding and carving in the following localities, Fai della Pagnella (TN), Folgaria (TN), and Valzodana (BL) while it is possible to do windsurfing, canoeing, and sub-aqua courses in Muravera (CA), Terasini (PA), and San Cristoforo- Lake Caldonazzo (TN).

== See also ==
- Higher education in Italy
- Lecce
- List of aerospace engineering schools
- List of engineering schools
- List of Italian universities
- Lists of law schools
- List of optometry schools
- List of schools of international relations
- Salento
