= Ophthalmic technician =

Type of health professional

Occupation
- Names: Ophthalmic technician
- Occupation type: Professional
- Activity sectors: Health care

Description
- Education required: Usually an undergraduate degree (BSc, BSc or A.Sc.), or diploma.
- Fields of employment: Healthcare, Ophthalmology
- Related jobs: Ophthalmologist, Optometrist

An ophthalmic technician is a health professional that performs ophthalmic screening and testing in order to provide the ophthalmologist with information needed to diagnose diseases and administer treatments in caring for patients' eyes and eyesight. They are considered to be an intermediate level of ophthalmic medical personnel since they are more advanced than ophthalmic assistants, yet not as advanced as an ophthalmic medical technologist. Ophthalmic technicians work in settings like private practices, hospitals, outpatient care centers, and surgical centers.

== Job description ==
An ophthalmic technician plays an important role in patient care. Patients see an ophthalmic technician to have the initial portion of their eye examination completed. During the initial assessment the ophthalmic technician takes the patient's history, assesses visual acuity, tests confrontational visual fields, evaluates pupils and ocular muscles, measures intraocular pressure and performs refractometry. They also provide patients with explanations of procedures and answer any questions the patient may have. However, there are many other job duties outside of patient care that an ophthalmic technician must be able to perform. This requires them to be well versed in a number of areas. The more technical aspect of the job includes conducting measurements, such as taking A-scans, as well as, conducting brightness acuity tests and contrast sensitivity tests. They provide assistance during surgeries through the sterilization of instruments, preparation of exam rooms, and disposal of biohazards. An ophthalmic technician also performs administrative tasks like ordering inventory and calibrating equipment. The technical aspect of this job plays a huge role in the quality of patient care, which is why they need to be well trained.

== Education ==
There are two pathways to becoming an Ophthalmic Technician. Each of these paths first require a high school diploma or GED.

One way to become an ophthalmic technician is by entering the field as a certified ophthalmic assistant (COA). To become a COA, one must complete an accredited training program or an independent study course. After getting certified, a minimum of 2,000 hours (one year full time) as a COA is required under the supervision of an ophthalmologist. These hours must be completed within two years of submitting the application to become an ophthalmic technician. Twelve JCAHPO Group A credits must be earned within one year of applying for certification. In the process of earning certified ophthalmic technician certification, the applicant must maintain certification as a COA. An application must then be completed to take the exam. This application requires the signature of an ophthalmologist to verify that the applicant meets the requirements. The exam consists of a written portion and a skill evaluation. The written exam is all multiple choice and must be passed before moving on to the skill evaluation. Both portions of the exam must be passed to become a certified ophthalmic technician.

The other path to becoming an ophthalmic technician is through schooling. Many programs offer an Ophthalmic Medical Technician associate degree. These programs are typically two years long. Some of the coursework for these programs include ocular anatomy and physiology, ophthalmic optics, ocular motility, and diseases of the eye. These programs aim to help students develop the personal traits and professional skills needed to perform as a competent ophthalmic technician. Going to school eliminates the need to work as an ophthalmic assistant for one year. The ophthalmic medical technician training program prepares students to take the exam to become a certified ophthalmic technician.

== Certification ==
The majority of employers require their ophthalmic technicians to be certified in order to practice professionally. There are three core levels of certification offered by the Joint Commission on Allied Health Personnel in Ophthalmology (JCAHPO).

- Certified Ophthalmic Assistant (COA) - entry level
- Certified Ophthalmic Technician (COT) - intermediate level
- Certified Ophthalmic Medical Technologist (COMT) - advanced level

Each of these levels has prerequisite requirements and an examination process. An allied ophthalmic personnel can make their way through the levels by working the required number of hours at one level and then taking the examination to move on to the next level. For each of these levels, recertification is required every three years. Recertification can be achieved by either completing the necessary number of continuing education credits or taking the written certifying exam again.

A study comparing certified with non-certified ophthalmic medical personnel on practice quality and productivity supports the advantage of certification. It was concluded that certified ophthalmic personnel significantly increase the productivity and quality of an ophthalmic practice.
