= UERMMMC College of Nursing =

The University of the East Ramon Magsaysay Memorial Medical Center College of Nursing is a nursing school in the Philippines. The College of Nursing was granted Philippine Accrediting Association of Schools, Colleges and Universities level IV accreditation, Federation of Accreditation Association of the Philippines level IV accreditation. The school has a 98.13% passing rate as of July 2011.

== History ==
The Medical Center's College of Nursing opened its doors in 1959. Since then, it has been its tradition to periodically assess and re-assess the curriculum as to its relevance to the guiding philosophy of the school, as well as to the national goals. Linkages with government and non-government agencies facilitated the effective implementation of the school's programs. Among the general changes adopted were conversion of the three-year graduate nurse program into a four- to five-year baccalaureate program; Revision of the baccalaureate curriculum; community-based, community-oriented curriculum; and integration of selected concepts in the curriculum.

The groundwork for the establishment of the College of Nursing commenced as early as October 1958. Dean Purita F. Asperilla put together the essential components of the college. The faculty line up were Paz de Leon, Patricia Villacorta, Natividad Espiritu and Pricscilla Sabinay, all of whom were master's degree holders from esteemed institutions here and abroad. A five-year bachelor of science curriculum was implemented to frame a comprehensive nursing education that encompass almost all facets of health and focus on the whole person rather than the disease.

It was on AY 1959-1960 that students were admitted for the first time in the college. Forty-seven students were accepted. Only the last three years of the five-year program was offered in the medical center. The first two years were allotted to the study of liberal arts, physical, biological, social sciences and humanities, which were taught at the UE Recto campus.

In January 1960, the first capping ceremony of the college was held and by April 1962, thirty out of the forty-seven nursing students graduated and became the first class to receive the Bachelor of Science in Nursing degree. This pioneer class engendered a 100% passing mark in the nurses’ board exam that same year.

When Dean Emeritus Evangelina M. Dumlao, took over in 1968, enrollment more than doubled thus requiring the college to expand. It was also under her headship when the five-year nursing program was revised to a four-year course. Class “Sulo” is its first batch of graduates in April 1980.

However, a decrease in enrollment was felt in the late 1970s due to a worldwide economic turmoil and as demand for nurses in foreign lands declined. Besides downsizing and cost cutting, Dean Dumlao conjured up a relevant medical model by creating the BSN Supplemental program designed to meet the demands for graduate nurses from GN program.

By taking over the deanship on 1984, Dean Carmelita Dela Cruz-Divinagracia (Pioneer ’62) is the first alumna dean of the college. With the adoption of the competency-based community-oriented curriculum, a community in Antipolo, Rizal was taken on in collaboration with the school's Alumni and Friends foundation. Continuous community organizing was also facilitated through strong linkages. The community immersion program was intensified in order to delivery of primary health care services. The school's Alumni and Friends Foundation purchased a piece of land where the future Primary Health Care Institute of the Medical Center will be established. Funding and other support in varied forms are being solicited at the moment to realize this vision for the FILIPINO people.

In 1988, the College of Nursing was transferred from the old building behind the University of the East Ramon Magsaysay quadrangle stage to its present location at the second floor of the administration building (previously occupied by the College of Dentistry). In August of the same year, The Federation of Accreditation Association of the Philippines and the Department of Education, Culture and Sports certified the accreditation of the college. A year later in September 1989, a regulated Level 2 Status was granted. More scholarships and financial supports for the academic development and other faculty development programs were solicited. On June 14, 1999, the College of Nursing was granted reaccreditation as a Level III institution by the Philippine Accrediting Association of Schools, Colleges and Universities for a period of five years, the first and only unit in the Medical Center with such status.

The college opened the new re-configured curriculum, the Associate in Health Science Education program in AY 1998–1999. This curriculum provides a common-two-year course to all health allied courses then allows students to shift on the third year to their course of interest.

The past performances of nursing graduates in the licensing board exams placed the school as one of the best in the Philippines. Class 1995 bagged 32 places in the top 20 and Ms. Car Mele Medina garnered first place in the 1998 Nurses’ Board Exam.

The hallmark of the College of Nursing as an academic unit is the achievements of all its graduates in various fields of interest and specialized practice of the profession. The quest for excellence and greater glory continues towards the new millennium.

The College of Nursing has level IV accreditation and accredited by the Commission on Higher Education as Center of Excellence. The school has a 98.13% passing rate as of July 2011.

As of the June–July 2012 Nurse Licensure Examination, the College of Nursing got a 90.99% passing rate by Class Archeans 2012. Archeans 2012 is the pioneer batch produced by the College of Nursing using the CHED New Nursing Curriculum (BS Nursing Revised Curriculum CMO #14s. 2009).

== See also ==
- Nursing in the Philippines
- University of the East
- University of the East Ramon Magsaysay Memorial Medical Center
