= Mindanao Medical Foundation College =

Private medical college in Davao City, Philippines

- Motto: Developing Health Care Leaders Since 1990
- Type: Private Non-Sectarian
- Established: 1990
- Chairman: Atty. Senforiano B. Alterado, Sr.
- President: Amie Theresa A. Bautista
- Location: Davao City, Davao del Sur, Philippines; 7°05′13″N 125°37′55″E
- Campus: R. Castillo St., Agdao, Davao City, Davao del Sur
- Colors: White
- Website: www.mmfcdavao.edu.ph
- Location in Mindanao Location in the Philippines

Mindanao Medical Foundation College (MMFC) is a private, non-sectarian medical college in Davao, Philippines.

== History ==
Mindanao Medical Foundation College (MMFC) began as a Medical School in 1990, in the city of Davao. Owned by Senforiano Alterado together with his famous Maritime School MATS College of Technology. MMFC is now managed by his daughter Aimee Alterado-Bautista. The school uses hospital-based learning at its own Hospital with 20-bed Alterado General Hospital, which also offers a program for Overseas Filipino Workers and affiliated hospitals.

All programs were recognized by the Commission on Higher Education. The college of Nursing was issued a government Recognition No. 023, s. 1993.

The college is authorized to accept foreign students with the granting of accreditation by the Bureau of Immigration and Deportation (BID).

MMFC is also the very first school in Mindanao to offer the Doctor of Optometry course.

== See also ==
- List of universities and colleges in the Philippines
- List of colleges of nursing in the Philippines
