= List of psychologists on postage stamps =

The following is a list of psychologists and contributors to the field of psychology who have been commemorated on worldwide postage stamps. It is adapted from two philatelic listings published by psychologists Dr. Gary Brucato and Dr. John D. Hogan in 1999, and psychology historian Dr. Ludy T. Benjamin in 2003. The following index provides the name of each honoree, a brief description of his or her contributions, and the nation and year in which the stamp was issued:

== A ==
- Aristotle (384-322 B.C.). Eminent Greek philosopher, often regarded as the father of "pre-science" psychology. His book De Anima (On the Soul) was among the first to address the interplay between psychological and physiological processes, as well as the concept of human intellect. He departed from the philosophical principles of his teacher Plato, emphasizing the importance of empirical observation, and postulating that the body and the mind exist as facets of the same being, with the mind being simply one of the body's functions.

Stamps issued: Greece (1956); Greece (1978); Cyprus (1978); Mali (1978); Mexico (1978); Spain (1992); Uruguay (1996); Chad (2000); Gibraltar (2009); Greece (2016); Bosnia and Herzegovina (2018)

- St. Thomas Aquinas (1225-1274). Italian theologian and Roman Catholic priest of the Dominican Order who adopted Aristotle's empirical approach to nature, maintaining that human beings possess an innate capacity to know many things without special, divine revelation. He also supported the unity of the body and soul, but, in accord with his Roman Catholic faith, believed that the latter was an immortal entity, and not simply a function of the body itself. Walter J. Freeman, the biologist and neuroscientist who pioneered research into the way the brain generates and processes meaning, considers Aquinas' work on the "directedness of the mind" a precursor to the modern neurocognitive concept of intentionality.

Stamps issued: Belgium (1932); Colombia (1938); Colombia (1959); Nicaragua (1968); Germany (1974); Italy (1974); Vatican City (1974); Colombia (1982); Sierra Leone (1992); Uganda (1996); Antigua and Barbuda (2000); Italy (2001) [2 distinct issues]; Italy (2006)

- Avicenna, a.k.a. Ibn Sina (980-1037). Persian philosopher, physician, physicist and astronomer. An early pioneer of neuropsychiatry, he was apparently the first medical practitioner to describe hallucinations, phobias, insomnia, mania, nightmares, melancholia, dementia, epilepsy, paralysis, stroke, vertigo, and tremors. He also made important contributions with regard to psychophysiology and psychosomatic medicine, recognizing and treating the relationship between emotional states and physical symptoms among his patients. In order to address physiological symptoms he felt were linked to psychic turmoil, Avicenna developed a word association task which pre-dated the work of Sigmund Freud and Carl Jung by nearly a millennium.

Stamps issued: Lebanon (1948); Iran (1950); Afghanistan (1951); German Democratic Republic (1952); Iran (1962); Syria (1965); Yemen Arab Republic (1966); Kuwait (1969); Iran (1980); Poland (1952); Pakistan (1966); Egypt (1968); Jordan (1971); Qatar (1971); Iran (1974); Algeria (1980); Comoros Islands (1980); Dubai (1980); Kuwait (1980); Libya (1980); Mali (1980); Soviet Union (1980); Tunisia (1980); Turkey (1980); Syria (1981); Iran (1983); Hungary (1987); Iran (1989); Iran (1992); Somalia (2003); Iran (2004); France (2005); Tajikistan (2005)

== B ==
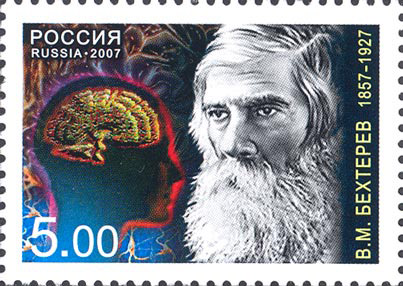
Russian stamp honoring Bekhterev issued in 2007

- Vladimir Bekhterev (1857-1927). Russian neurophysiologist and psychiatrist who founded of the field of psychoreflexology, adapting the research on classical conditioning his competitor Ivan Pavlov had conducted with dogs for experimentation with human beings. He is also remembered for establishing the first laboratory of experimental psychology in Russia in 1886, an important classification of mental illnesses in 1891, and the first Russian journal on nervous diseases in 1896. Moreover, Bekhterev made a variety of significant contributions to neuroanatomy, including the elucidation of the role of the hippocampus in memory; the discovery of the superior vestibular nucleus and 13 distinct reflex arcs; and the identification of the spinal malady Bekhterev’s Disease.

Stamps issued: Soviet Union (1952); Russia (2007)

- Georg von Békésy (1899-1972). Hungarian biophysicist who made a key contribution to the field of biological psychology by demonstrating that sounds of different frequencies create traveling waves which peak at different locations within the cochlea of the mammalian hearing organ. This work earned him the Nobel Prize in Physiology or Medicine in 1961.

Stamps issued: Hungary (1961); Sweden (1984)

- George Berkeley (1685-1753). Anglo-Irish bishop and empiricist philosopher of the early modern era who made notable contributions to the field of perceptual psychology. He is remembered for advancing the theory of immaterialism, later known as subjective idealism, which posited that individuals can only directly know sensations and ideas of objects, not abstractions such as "matter," so that it is impossible for something to exist without being perceived.

Stamps issued: Ireland (1985)

- Claude Bernard (1813-1878). French physiologist who, in addition to his celebrated work on homeostasis and the dangers of poisons such as carbon monoxide, discovered the vasodilator and vasoconstrictor functions of the "vegetative" nervous system, later known as the autonomic nervous system.

Stamps issued: France (1939); Argentina (1959); France (1978); Mozambique (2002)

== C ==
- Jean-Martin Charcot (1825-1893). French neurologist and professor of anatomical pathology at Paris' Pitié-Salpêtrière Hospital. He established neurology as a firm discipline, identifying and/or elucidating the natures of myriad neurological disorders, including amyotrophic lateral sclerosis, epilepsy, poliomyelitis, neurosyphilis, strokes, Charcot–Wilbrand syndrome, Charcot-Marie-Tooth disease, and nuiliary aneurysms. He is also remembered for his ideas on the subjects of hypnosis and hysteria, which influenced the later work of several of his students, including Alfred Binet, Pierre Janet and Sigmund Freud.

Stamps issued: France (1960)

- Auguste Comte (1798-1857). French philosopher who was an important proponent of the school of positivism, maintaining that any method for acquiring knowledge should be limited to natural, physical, and material approaches. The concept would greatly influence the Behaviorist school of the twentieth century, as well the field of modern quantitative statistical analysis. Comte was also one of the founders of Sociology and is believed to have coined the term "altruism."

Stamps issued: Brazil (1957); France (1957); Romania (1957)

== D ==
- Charles Darwin (1809-1882). English naturalist who presented compelling evidence that all living creatures evolved over time from common ancestors through a process he called natural selection. He published three books in which he explored how human mental qualities and emotional states could be understood as the results of evolution; specifically, The Descent of Man in 1871, The Expression of the Emotions in Man and Animals in 1872 and Biographical Sketch of an Infant in 1877. Darwin's work had far-reaching impacts on the theory and practice of psychology. Its emphasis on the individual's adaptation to the environment helped to establish the "functional" view of the mind and of human behavior later developed by such thinkers as John Dewey and James Rowland Angell, and influenced the work of George Romanes, the father of comparative psychology. Moreover, the concept of natural selection led to greater interests in variation and individual differences among members of the same species.

Stamps issued: Ecuador (1935); Ecuador (1936); East Germany (1958); Czechoslovakia (1959); Poland (1959); Romania (1959: Soviet Union (1959); Turalu (1977); Cocos Islands (1981); St. Helena (1981); Antigua (1982); Australia (1982); Ecuador (1982); Falkland Islands (1982); Great Britain (1982); India (1983); Mauritius (1982); St. Thomas and Prince Islands (1982); Sierra Leone (1982); Ecuador (1983); Turks and Caicos (1984); Australia (1986); Cocos Islands (1986); Grenada (1991); Cambodia (1992); Great Britain (1999); North Korea (1999); Palau (2000); Vietnam (2000); Mongolia (2002); Mozambique (2002); Sao Tome & Principe (2003); Great Britain (2005); Ascension Island (2006); Congo (2006); Great Britain (2006); Kiribati (2006); St. Helena (2006); Guinea-Bissau (2007); Sap Tome & Principe (2008); Ascension Island (2009); Bulgaria (2009); Comoros (2009); Djibouti (2009); Gibraltar (2009); Great Britain (2009) [3 distinct sets]; Guernsey (2009); Guinea (2009); Ireland (2009); Italy (2009); Micronesia (2009); Mozambique (2009); Nevis (2009); Palau (2009); Portugal (2009); Rwanda (2009); Vanuatu (2009); Gabon (2010): Togo (2010); Mali (2017)

- Allison Davis (1902-1983). African-American educator, anthropologist, author and scholar who was the first Black to hold a full faculty position at a major White university when he joined the staff of the University of Chicago in 1942. He is remembered for his pioneering research on intelligence quotients, as well as his studies of southern race and class during the 1930s. Moreover, Davis' support of "compensatory education" contributed to the establishment of the federal educational program Head Start.

Stamps issued: United States (1994)

- Jean-Ovide Decroly (1871-1932). Belgian educator and psychologist whose educational model emphasized a child-centered approach recognizing the importance of an optimal learning environment, challenges for the child that were age-appropriate, and an emphasis on creativity.

Stamps issued: Belgium (1981), (2001)

- René Descartes (1596-1650). French philosopher and mathematician whose concepts provided early and significant contributions to the field of psychology. His controversial writings, including Discourse on Method in 1637, Meditations on First Philosophy in 1642 and Principles of Philosophy in 1644, postulated a radical mind-body dualism, stating that the two are separate entities interconnected at the pineal gland, and that mental perceptions, passing through the flawed machinery of the body, are not necessarily accurate. His rationalistic ideas greatly influenced the Age of Enlightenment and proved the dominant system of philosophy until the work of David Hume and Immanuel Kant. While many of Descartes's individual arguments have since been discredited, his overall view of the dualism between mind and body has exerted a powerful influence on subsequent generations of philosophers and psychologists.

Stamps issued: France (1937); Albania (1996); France (1996); Monaco (1996); Grenada (2000); Sierra Leone (2000); Guinea (2010), Ivory Coast (2017)

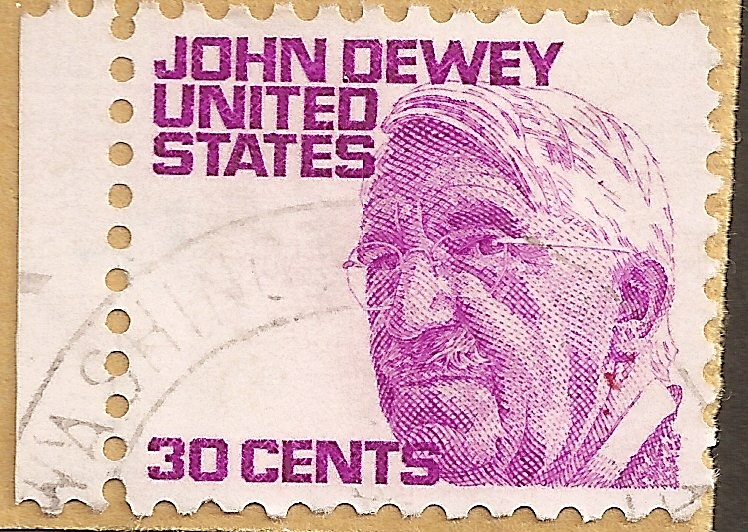
American stamp honoring Dewey issued in 1968

- John Dewey (1859-1952). American psychologist, philosopher and progressive educator who is considered one of the founders of the school of pragmatism. He was also a key figure in American functional psychology, publishing an article on the reflex arc in 1896 which is now considered a cornerstone of that field. Dewey helped to found the American Psychological Association and was elected its President in 1899.

Stamps issued: United States (1968)

- Dorothea Dix (1802-1887). American social reformer who was an early advocate for the humane treatment of mentally ill persons, lobbying state legislatures and the U.S. Congress leading to the construction of numerous mental asylums.

Stamps issued: United States (1983)

== E ==
- John Eccles (1903-1997). An Australian neurophysiologist whose research on neural synapses won him the Nobel Prize in Physiology or Medicine in 1963. Much of his work addressed the long-standing mind-brain problem central to the science of psychology.

Stamps issued: Sweden (1984)

- Christian von Ehrenfels (1859-19320. Ehrenfels was a philosopher born in Rodaun, Austria, a small village near Vienna. He is considered an important precursor of Gestalt psychology principally because of his publication in 1890 of On the Qualities of Form. This work emphasized that entities, such as a melody, were more than a mere sum of their parts (notes, in this case). In other words, there was a quality that could not be defined solely by the collection of notes. The familiar version of this premise in Gestalt psychology is that "the whole is different than the sum of its parts."

Stamps issued: Austria (1984)

== F ==
- Auguste Forel (1848-1931). Forel was a Swiss psychiatrist. His book, The Sexual Question (1906), is considered to be one of the founding works on the science of human sexual behavior.

Stamps: Switzerland (1971)

- Sigmund Freud (1856-1939). Freud, an Austrian neurologist, was the founder of psychoanalysis, which was a theory of the normal mind and the neuroses as well as both a method for investigating the unconscious and a method of psychotherapeutic treatment. His influence was principally on the fields of personality and clinical psychology but he influenced psychology more broadly as well, for example, recognizing the role of unconscious processes, emphasizing the importance of early experiences in shaping later behaviors, noting that psychological disorders could result from psychic causes as well as somatic ones, positing a number of defense mechanisms that individuals use to cope with anxiety, and emphasizing the importance of sexual behavior.

Stamps issued: Grenada (1973), Liberia (1973), Austria (1981), Great Britain (1986), Cuba (1993), Marshall Islands (1997), Guyana (1999), Palau (2000), St. Vincent & Grenadines (2000), Belgium (2001), Congo (2001), Austria (2006), Czech Republic (2006)

== G ==
- Lillian Moller Gilbreth (1878-1972). Gilbreth's doctoral dissertation was on the psychology of management. In 1904 she married Frank Gilbert. Together they would become pioneers in the Scientific Management movement started by Frederick Winslow Taylor. The Gilbreths were especially well known for their time and motion studies, researching the "one best way" to perform a variety of manufacturing tasks. The Gilbreths would have 12 children leading to the book and motion picture entitled "Cheaper By the Dozen." When Frank died in 1924, Lillian continued running their engineering and management consulting company for nearly 40 years. Because of her work in engineering (e.g., product design, kitchen design, workplace efficiency, workplace lighting), Lillian Gilbreth is actually better known in the engineering fields than within psychology. She was credited as "the First Lady of Engineering," and was the first woman admitted to the prestigious National Academy of Engineering. In 1983 the United States Postal Service proposed the issuance of a commemorative stamp for Gilbreth. The mock-up of the stamp featured her portrait and the caption "America's First Lady of Engineering." However, the American Psychological Association objected to the caption and argued for inclusion of the fact that she was a psychologist. When the 40-cent stamp appeared in 1984 as part of the Great Americans series it bore no wording except her name.

Stamps issued: United States (1984)

- Ragnar Granit (1900-1991). Granit was a Finnish neurophysiologist. In 1919 he began his college studies in scientific psychology, interested in the processes of vision. Eventually he shifted his interests to physiology and earned his medical degree in 1927. His career was dedicated to understanding the neurophysiology and neurochemistry of vision. He developed innovative techniques that allowed him to study the activity of a single visual receptor. His work has influenced many psychologists working in the field of human vision, especially regarding the perception of color. For his visual work, Granit received the Nobel Prize in Physiology or Medicine in 1967.

Stamps issued: Sweden (1996)

== H ==
- Hermann von Helmholtz (1821-1894). Helmholtz was a German scientist who saw very few boundaries in his pursuits. His formal training was in medicine but he contributed to many fields, especially physics, physiology, and psychology, but also to philosophy and astronomy. He held professorships at several important German universities especially Heidelberg University and Humboldt University in Berlin. It was at Heidelberg where Wilhelm Wundt, the founder of the science of psychology, would serve as a research assistant to Helmholtz for more than six years. Helmholtz's many contributions to psychology include the first studies to measure the speed of conduction in the nerves, a theory of color vision, and a theory of auditory pitch perception. Prior to the work of Helmholtz, nerves were thought to conduct impulses instantaneously, thus at a speed that was immeasurable. Helmholtz proved that wrong and that conduction speeds were quite measurable. This discovery made possible the many studies of reaction time that defined much of the early work in the new science of psychology.

Stamps issued: East Germany (1950), West Germany (1971), Germany (1994)

- David Hubel (1926-2013). Hubel was born in Canada to American parents and raised in Montreal. His training was in medicine, however he spent his long research career studying vision particular the processing of information in the visual cortex. He is best known for a collaboration with Swedish neurophysiologist Torsten Wiesel when the two of them worked at Johns Hopkins University. Their work resulted in both receiving the Nobel Prize in Physiology or Medicine in 1981. Studying the visual cortex in cats they discovered that there were specific cell arrangements which they labeled simple and complex cells, that were responsible for the detection of edges, motion, and color. This work was key to understanding how the brain processed information from the rods and cones.

Stamps issued: Sweden (1984)

== J ==
- Carl Gustav Jung (1875-1961). Jung was a Swiss psychiatrist, initially drawn to Sigmund Freud's psychoanalysis. Freud felt that Jung would be the heir apparent to his work, but after seven years as Freud's disciple, their friendship came to an acrimonious end when Jung dared to reject some of Freud's tenets. Jung would name his psychology analytical psychology to distinguish it from Freudian psychoanalysis. Jung divided the unconscious into two parts: personal and collective. The former was similar to Freud's views in which the unconscious was the wellspring of repressed wishes and motives. The collective unconscious represented the individual's racial memories in which experiences of ancestral generations were embedded deep in the unconscious. At the core of the collective unconscious were what Jung called archetypes that predisposed individuals to behave in certain ways. His most enduring impact on scientific psychology has been his delineation of the concepts of introversion and extraversion, concepts important in the study of personality and in treatments of behavioral change.

Stamps issued: Grenada (1973), Switzerland (1978), Congo (2001)

== K ==
- Immanuel Kant (1724-1804). Kant was a German philosopher, recognized as perhaps the most significant voice of the Age of Enlightenment. His best known work was A Critique of Pure Reason published in 1781. It influenced many scholarly fields, including psychology by its treatment of cognitive processes such as thinking and perception.

Stamps issued: Germany (1927), West Germany (1961), (1974)

== L ==
- Gottfried Wilhelm Leibniz (1646-1716). A German mathematician and philosopher, Leibniz is seen, like Immanuel Kant, as a major influence on the psychology of Wilhelm Wundt who founded psychology's first research laboratory in 1879. Leibniz wrote on attention, consciousness, association, memory, and perception, all of which were and are central concepts in scientific psychology, and his writing found fuller expression in Wundt's early books on psychology.

Stamps issued: Germany (1926), 1950), (1966), Romania (1966), West Germany (1980), Germany (1996), Chad (2015)

== M ==
- Egaz Moniz (1874-1955). Moniz, a Portuguese physician, received the Nobel Prize in Physiology or Medicine in 1949. It is perhaps the only Nobel Prize that the Swedish Academy should take back. Moniz won the prize for his surgical technique which he touted as a cure for certain kinds of mental illness, particularly schizophrenia and depression. He argued that many mental illnesses were caused by abnormal neural connections in the frontal lobes of the brain. And so he developed a surgical procedure to remove some of those connections by cutting into the frontal lobes, a procedure known as prefrontal leucotomy (renamed lobotomy in the United States). Hundreds of thousands of these operations were performed worldwide with often tragic results leading some countries to outlaw their use as early as 1950. Lobotomies largely disappeared by the 1970s. The United States never invoked a ban but psychotropic medications and more precise psychosurgeries have replaced the lobotomy as a treatment for mental illness.

Stamps issued: Portugal (1966), (1974), (1983), (1999)

- Maria Montessori (1870-1952). Montessori was an Italian physician and educator who began her career studying mentally challenged children, especially children who might be described as developmentally delayed. Her work led her to develop a laboratory school offering science-based practices to meet the needs of these children and an academy (the Orthophrenic School) to train teachers in the use of her methods. Montessori believed that children were intrinsically motivated to learn and that educational practices should recognize and reward that. Her methods emphasized the development of creativity by allowing children to direct much of their learning. "Montessori Schools" can be found worldwide today. According to the American Montessori Society there are approximately 22,000 Montessori schools today in at least 110 countries.

Stamps issued: India (1970), Italy (1970), Pakistan (1970), Italy (2007)

== P ==
- Bertha Pappenheim (1859-1936). Very few psychologists would recognize the name Bertha Pappenheim, but many would recognize her pseudonym, Anna O. Anna O. is the most famous clinical case in psychoanalytic history. At about age 21 she sought psychiatric help, presenting with a wide range of symptoms, including headaches, partial paralyses, periods of overexcitement, and loss of sensation. Her therapist was the distinguished Austrian physician, Josef Breuer. Breuer shared his treatment of Anna O. with Sigmund Freud, and Freud was fascinated by the case and by the means that Breuer had used to cure her (variously referred to as the "talking cure" or "cathartic cure"). In 1895, when Breuer and Freud published a book of psychological case studies, the case of Anna O. was the opening chapter. Her case was also the subject of Freud's opening lecture in 1909 when he made his only visit to the United States. The identity of Anna O. remained unknown until Ernest Jones, a Freud biographer, revealed her true identity in the 1950s. Pappenheim, Austrian by birth, was a pioneering social worker and feminist activist. Her German stamp appeared in a postal series labeled "Benefactors of Mankind."

Stamps issued: Germany, 1954

- Ivan Petrovich Pavlov (1849-1936). Pavlov won the Nobel Prize in Physiology or Medicine for his work on the physiology of digestion, including innovative research on salivation. He was the first Russian to win a Nobel Prize. However, he is known in psychology for his studies of learning in dogs, particularly classical conditioning, which is also called Pavlovian conditioning. This research proved especially important for the rise of behaviorism as a dominant school in American psychology. His work elucidated the parameters of such psychological constructs as extinction, spontaneous recovery, generalization, discrimination, conditioned inhibitions, and many others. His conditioning research was so important that he was nominated four more times in the 1920s for the Nobel Prize, although he did not win a second prize.

Stamps issued: Soviet Union (1949), Romania (1952), Argentina (1959), Sweden (1964), Soviet Union (1969), Hungary (1989), Soviet Union (1991), Cuba (1993), Chad (1997), St. Vincent & the Grenadines (2001), Guinea-Bissau (2005), Sao Tome & Principe (2008), Chad (2010)

- Wilder Graves Penfield (1891-1976). Born in Spokane, Washington, Penfield's career as a neurosurgeon began in the United States, however his most significant years were spent in Canada at McGill University where he was co-founder of the Montreal Neurological Institute and Hospital. There he developed surgical procedures that allowed him to study brain function in patients who were conscious and under only local anesthesia. The work was designed to eliminate the symptoms of epilepsy but it provided a detailed map of brain functions, identifying brain areas responsible for various sensory and motor functions. His brain maps showing cortical localization, published in the 1950s, are still in use today.

Stamps issued: Canada (1991)

- Johann Heinrich Pestalozzi (1746-1827). Pestalozzi was a Swiss philosopher and educator. His educational philosophy and instructional methods significantly influenced educational practices in many countries and the field of psychology as well, especially educational psychology. He recognized the reality of individual differences and believed that teaching should be tailored to such, including grouping children by ability rather than age. He promoted teacher training. He encouraged active learning, student-generated learning, enriched sensory experiences, and field trips.

Stamps issued: Switzerland (1927), (1946)

- Jean Piaget (1896-1980). Piaget was a Swiss psychologist known especially for his stage-theory of children's cognitive development. His doctoral degree was actually in zoology, but his early employment was with a distinguished array of psychologists including Alfred Binet, Theodore Simon, and Édouard Claparède. He used methods of investigation that were quite unconventional, including studying his own children. And he emphasized that in-depth questioning of children about their cognitions allowed a fuller understanding of the mental processes involved. His stage theory of cognitive development dominated psychology through much of the 20th century, however more recent work has challenged his views and his research methods.

Stamps issued: Switzerland (1996)

- Philippe Pinel (1745-1826). Pinel was a French physician and social reformer who was in charge of two mental asylums in Paris shortly after the French Revolution, first the Biĉetre and later the Salpêtrière. He was distressed by the treatment of mentally ill patients and argued for more humane measures. He recognized that they were treated more as inmates than patients and that their treatment often involved beatings, isolation for long periods of time, and being kept in chains. As superintendent of these asylums he sought to eliminate such practices and trained his hospital staff in his philosophy of treatment which he called moral therapy. Today a large statue of Pinel stands at the entrance to the grounds of the Salpêtriére.

Stamps issued: France (1958)

- Jan Evangelista Purkyně (1787-1869). This Czech anatomist and physiologist is better known among North American and German psychologists as Jan Purkinje. In the 1820s he published two volumes on the physiology of the senses, particularly vision, which would greatly influence the study of perception in psychology. One phenomenon described in this work is now known as the Purkinje Effect or Purkinje Shift, which states that as light intensity decreases (for example in the evening when the sun is setting), red objects are seen to fade faster than blue objects when both are actually at the same brightness.

Stamps issued: Czechoslovakia (1937), (1987)

== R ==
- Santiago Ramon y Cajal (1842-1934). A Spanish neuroscientist, Ramon y Cajal's importance for psychology was his synaptic theory of memory, which posited that the growth of new neuron connections in the brain was the basis of the formation of memories. As such, neurons served as information processing sites. His work established what was to be called the neuron doctrine, explaining the link between neurons and synapses in nervous transmission. For this and other contributions to neurophysiology and anatonmy he received the Nobel Prize in Physiology or Medicine in 1906.

Stamps issued: Spain (1934), (1952), Sweden (1966), Cuba (1993)

- Hermann Rorschach (1884-1922). Rorschach is known, of course, for the eponymous inkblots that he published in 1921. Rorschach intended the ambiguous blots to be used in the diagnosis of schizophrenia, but he died of peritonitis the following year at age 37 and his blots found new uses with other clinicians. His inkblots would grow in popularity and usage becoming a major assessment tool for personality studies and for the diagnosis of psychoses. The Rorschach Test is based on the Freudian notion of projection, that is, that the individual, when describing what he/she sees in the blots, will project onto them repressed anxieties and fears that are revealing of the unconscious. The test enjoyed considerable use as a tool of clinical psychology from the 1930s through the 1960s. Yet, research in the 1970s and later would questions its reliability and validity. It is still in use today but a host of other, more objective, methods dominate the assessment field of the 21st century.

Stamps issued: Micronesia (2000)

== S ==
- Hans Selye (1907-1982). Selye was an Austrian-Canadian physician known for his work on stress. His General Adaptation Syndrome is described in virtually every introductory psychology textbook. The syndrome is a three-stage process that begins with an alarm phase, followed by a stage of resistance, and, if that is not effective in sufficiently reducing the stress, then the third stage exhaustion and possibly death, will occur. For his work on stress, He was nominated many years for the Nobel Prize in Physiology or Medicine, but he did not win the Prize.

Stamps issued: Canada (2000)

- Roger Wolcott Sperry (1913-1994). Roger Sperry is often identified as a psychologist. Indeed neuropsychologist is the label that fits him best. His master's degree was in psychology but his doctoral degree was in zoology. However, he did postdoctoral work with psychologist Karl Lashley that importantly shaped his views about brain function. Sperry's most significant work, and certainly his most important work for psychology, was his split brain studies, research that began in 1959. Working with cats, monkeys, and humans, Sperry severed the corpus callosum, the major commissure connecting the two hemispheres of the brain. In humans, these brain surgeries were done to control epilepsy. The effects of the separation of the two halves of the brain should have been catastrophic, but, amazingly, the behavioral changes were often minor and difficult to observe except when using special investigative techniques. Sperry developed these techniques which showed that the two halves of the brain did have some different functions and were not mere duplicates of each other. For this work he was awarded the Nobel Prize in Physiology or Medicine in 1981.

Stamps issued: Sweden (1984)

== W ==
- Alfred Russel Wallace (1823-1913). Wallace was a British naturalist who independently arrived at an explanation of evolution by natural selection. Because he knew of Darwin's work on this subject, in 1858 Wallace sent Darwin by mail a brief manuscript of his theory which Darwin recognized as a bare bones statement of his own ideas. Darwin was devastated. He had worked largely in secret on this theory for almost 20 years and now he was about to lose all credit for that work. The full story of this situation is beyond the scope of this entry but many scholarly accounts describe its history and resolution. Wallace would enjoy a career of considerable scientific accomplishment. But he is listed here for his theory of evolution that has greatly impacted psychology as it has so many of the other sciences.

Stamps issued: Sao Tome & Principe (2009), Great Britain (2010)

- Torsten Wiesel (1924 - ). Wiesel is a Swedish neurophysiologist whose collaboration with David Hubel on the cellular structure and function of the visual cortex won them both the Nobel Prize in Physiology or Medicine in 1981 (see the earlier entry on David Hubel).

Stamps issued: Sweden (1984)

== See also ==
- List of people on stamps of Ireland
