= Saint Martin University =

University in Colombia

Fundación Universitaria San Martín
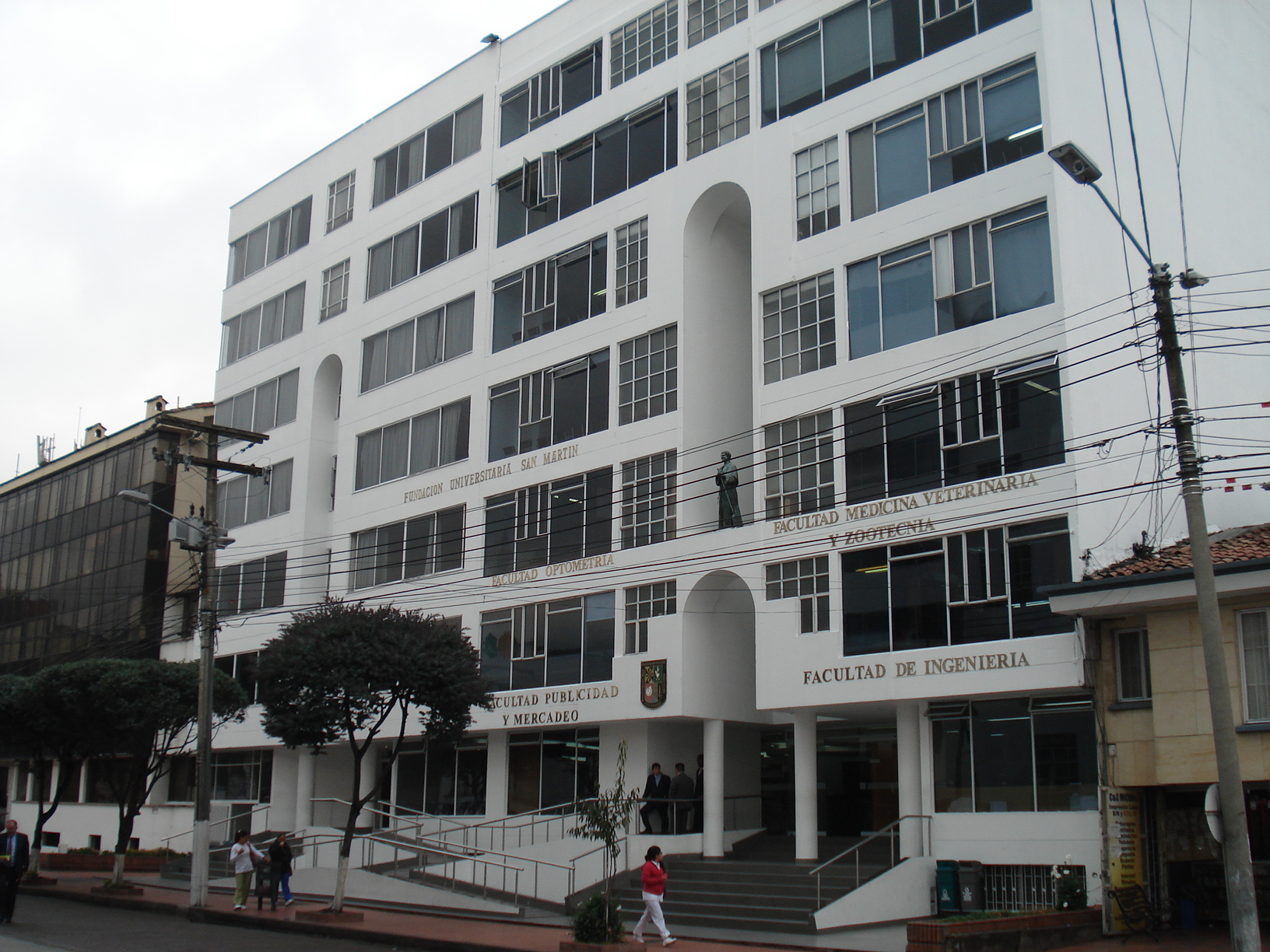
- Motto: Per sapientiam et laborem ad lucem
- Type: Private
- Established: 1981
- Founders: Mariano A. Alvear Sofán, Gloria Orozco de Alvear and Arturo Ocampo Álvarez
- Rector: Jaime Villamizar Lamus
- Location: Carrera 19 N° 80-63, Bogotá, Colombia; 4.66815°N 74.058884°W
- Website: http://www.sanmartin.edu.co

The Fundación Universitaria San Martín (FUSM) is a Colombian private university with headquarters in Bogotá and extension offices throughout the country.

In 1981, the San Martin University Foundation was founded by Mariano A. Alvear Sofán, Gloria Orozco de Alvear and Arturo Ocampo Álvarez. Initiated in the area of Health Sciences in the Faculty of Dentistry, it has today 13 faculties from different disciplines in the areas of Administrative and Engineering and Social Sciences. In 1998, the Facultad Abierta y a Distancia opens its doors. Today the University has 17 faculties, each with different programs in the areas of Administrative Sciences, Engineering and Social Sciences, Health Sciences, and veterinary medicine and technology.

== Gallery ==
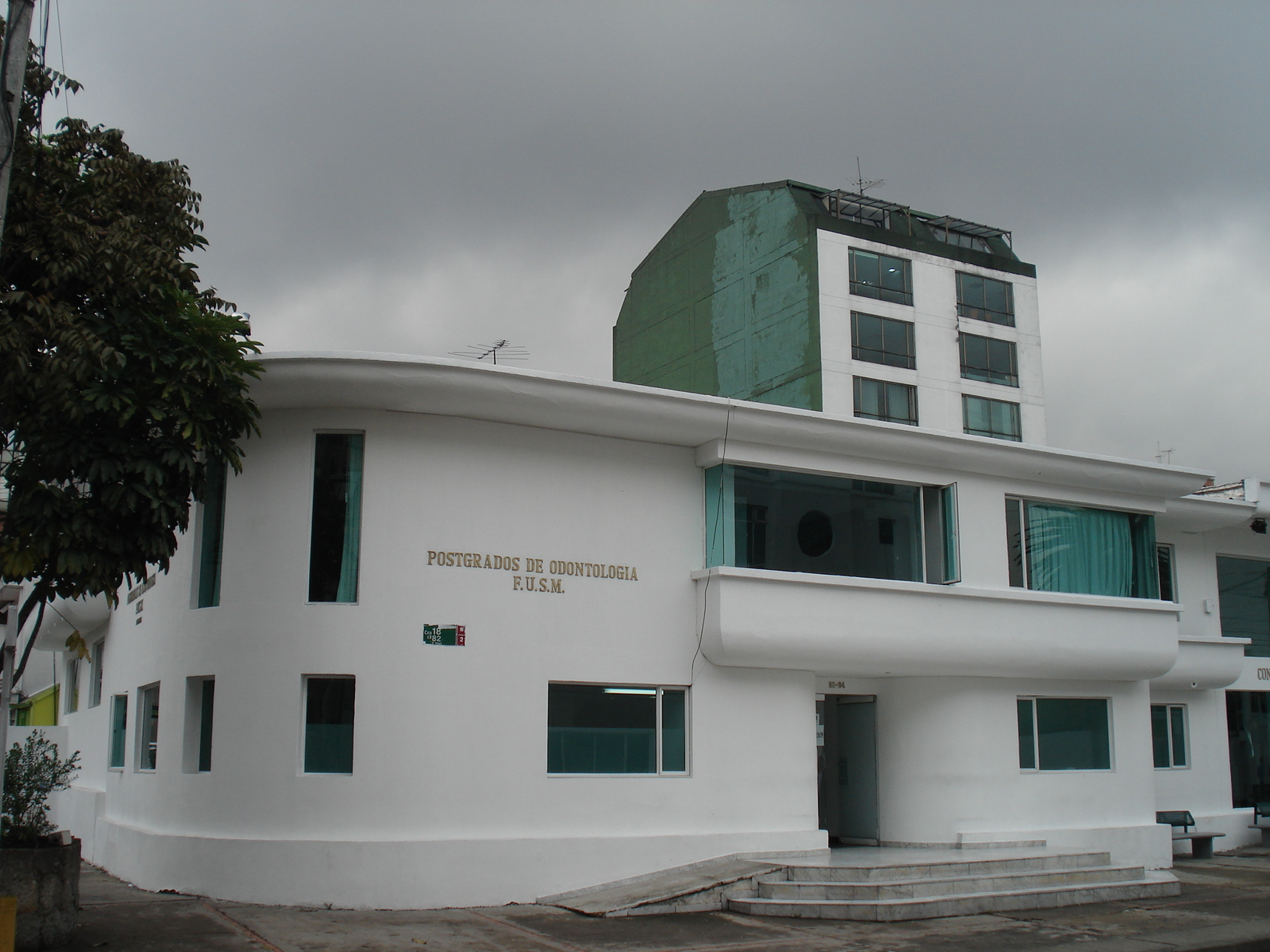
FUSM Bogotá Postgrados Odontología

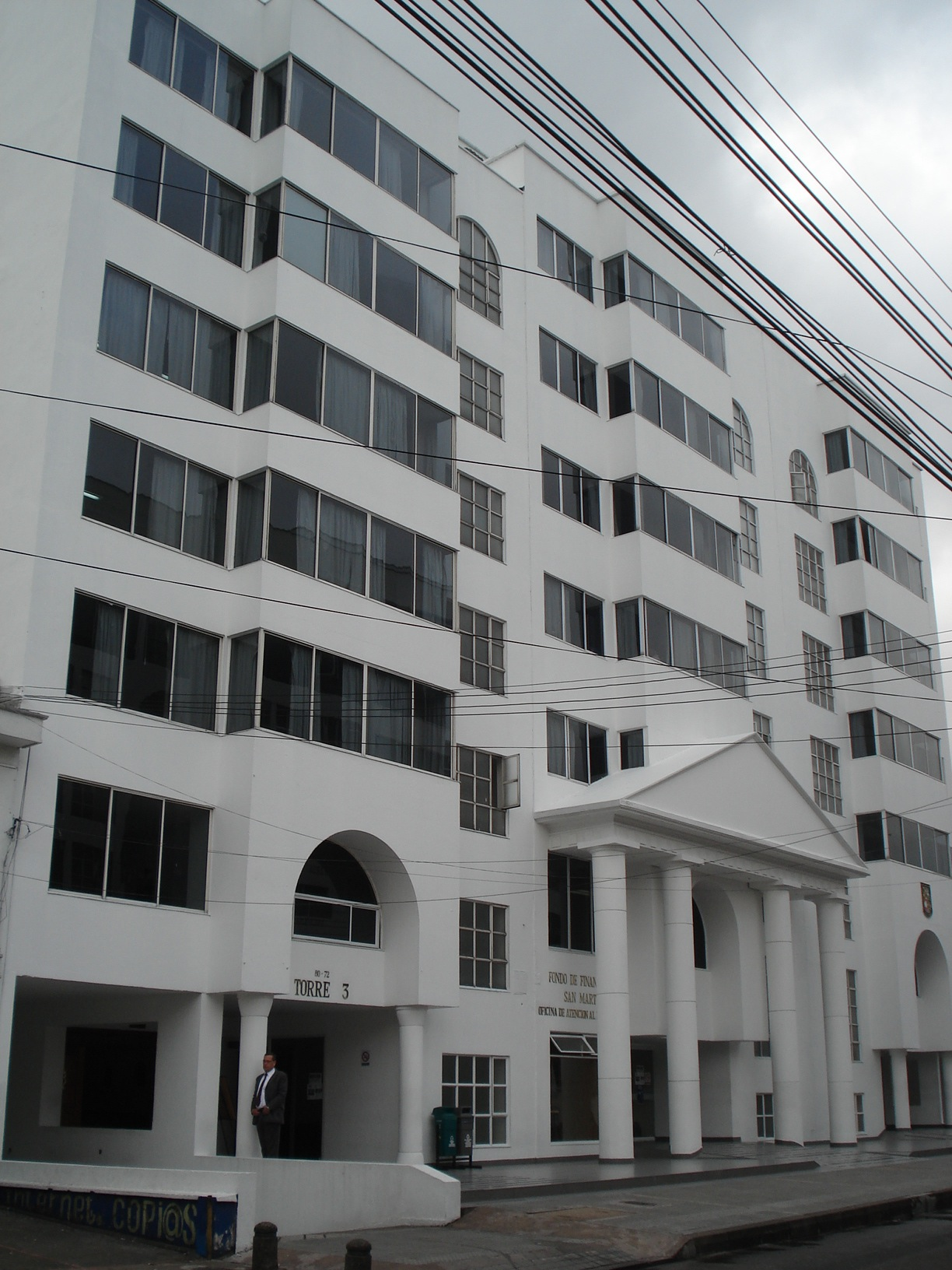
FUSM Bogotá Torre 3

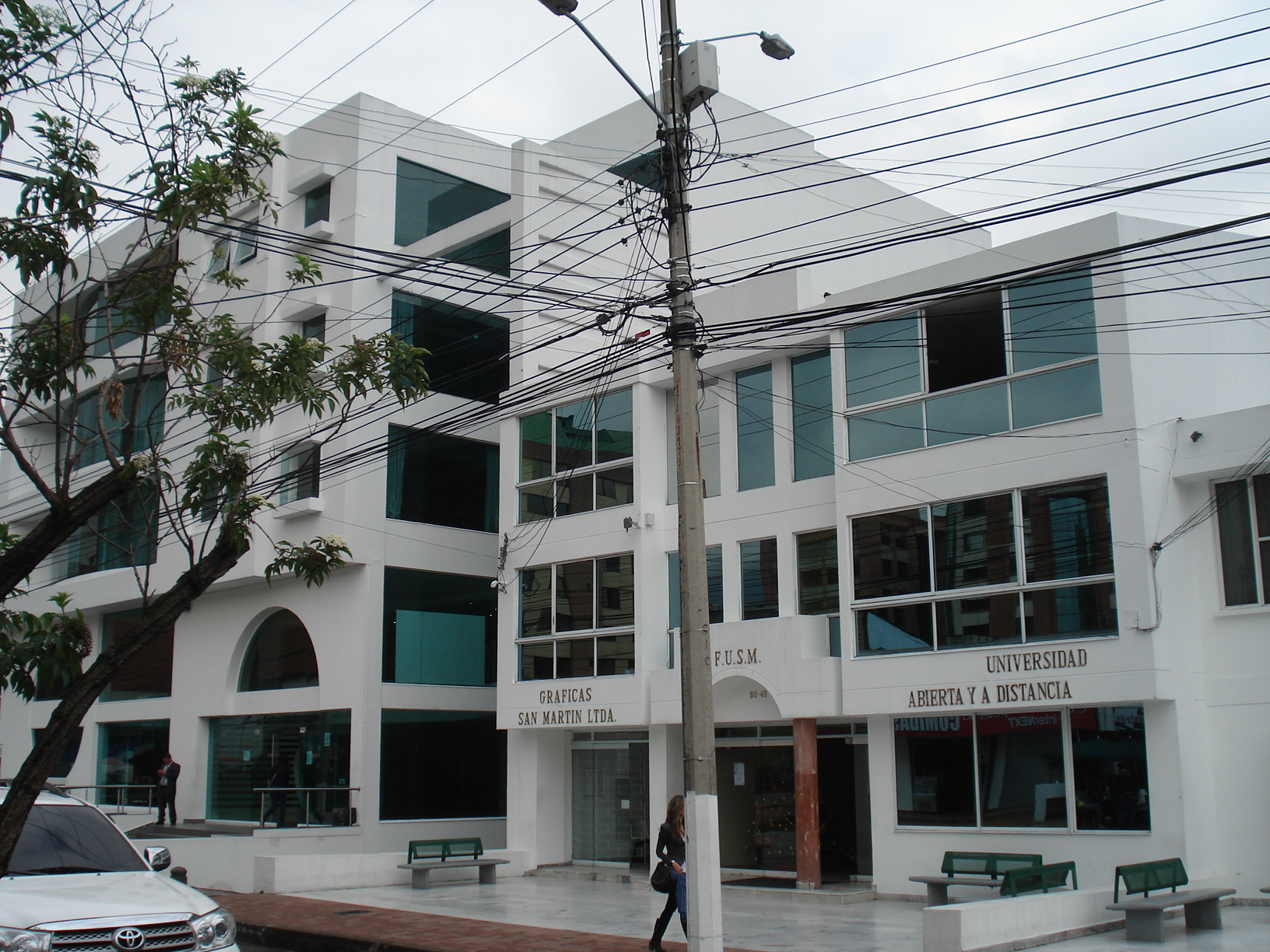
FUSM Bogotá, Facultad Abierta y a Distancia

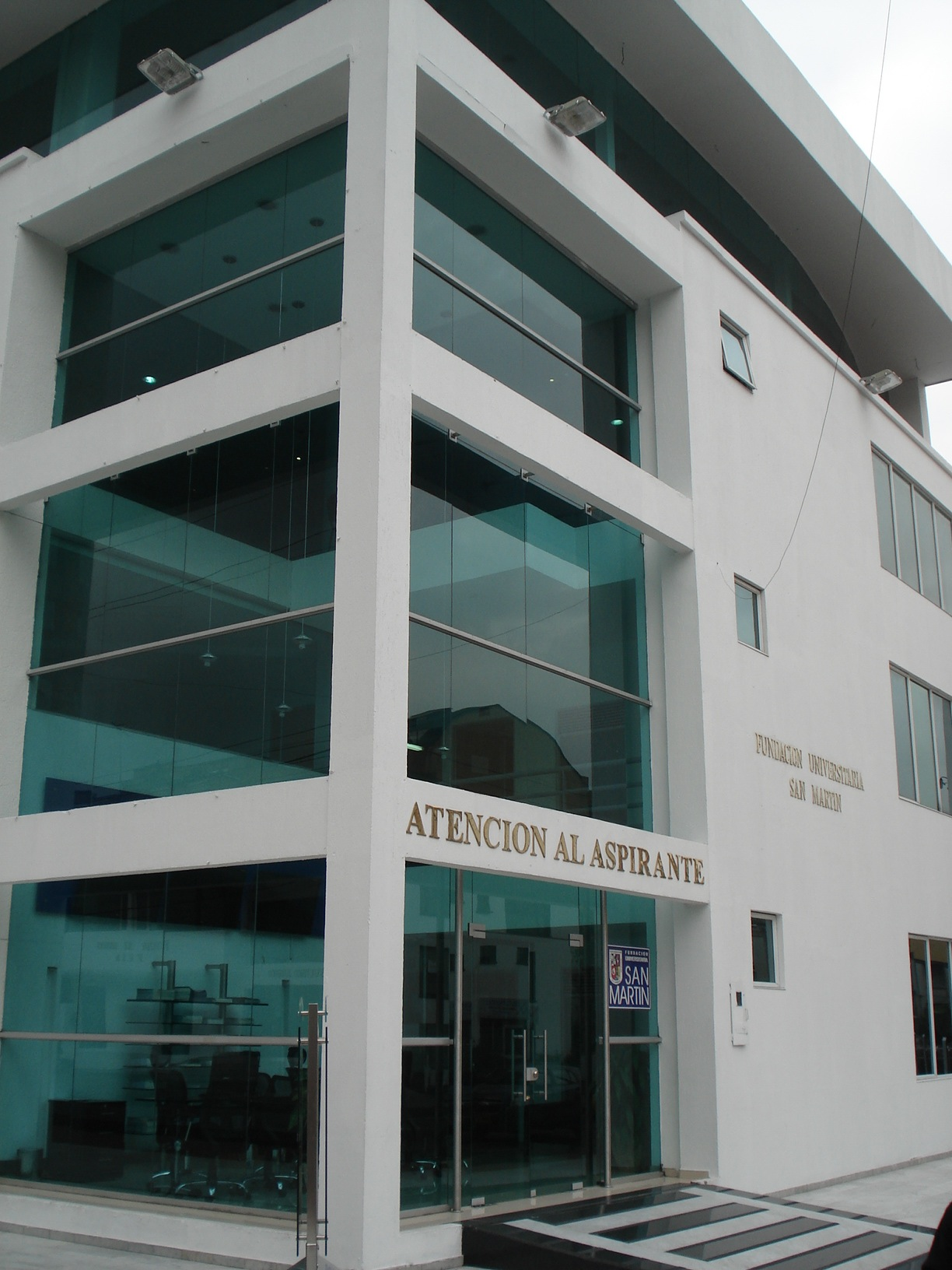
FUSM Bogotá, Admisiones

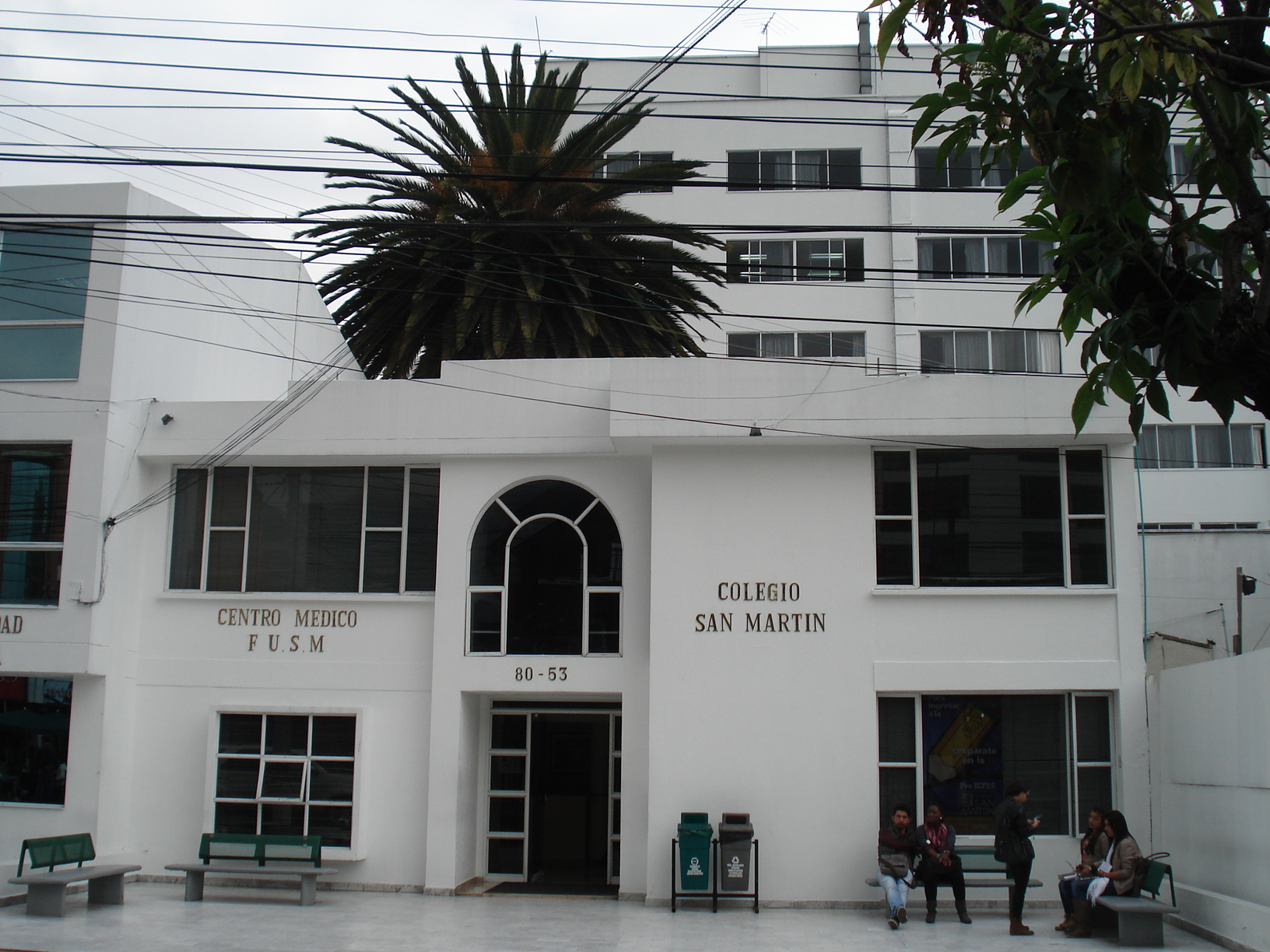
FUSM Bogotá, Centro Médico y Colegio

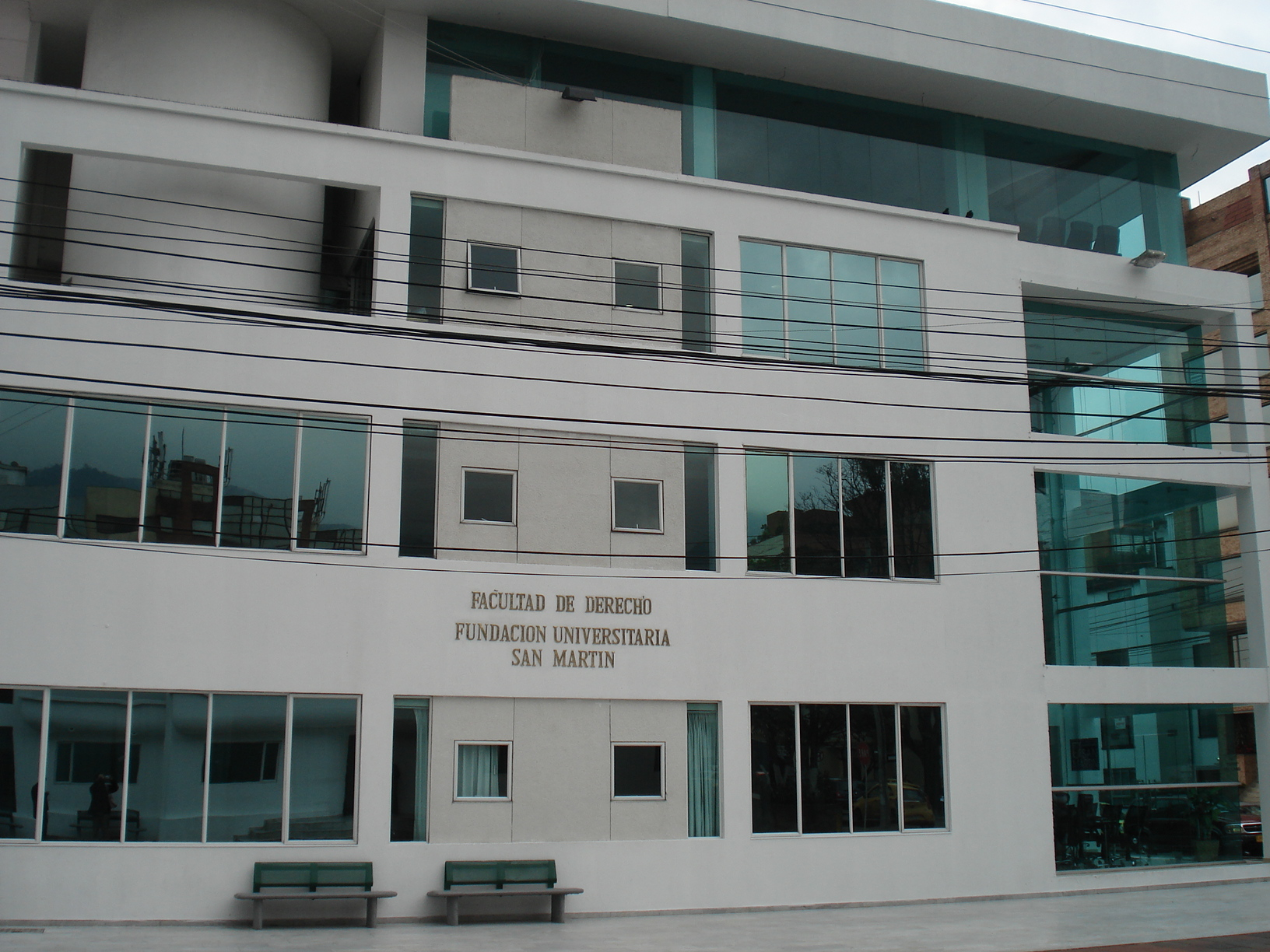
FUSM Bogotá, Facultad de Derecho

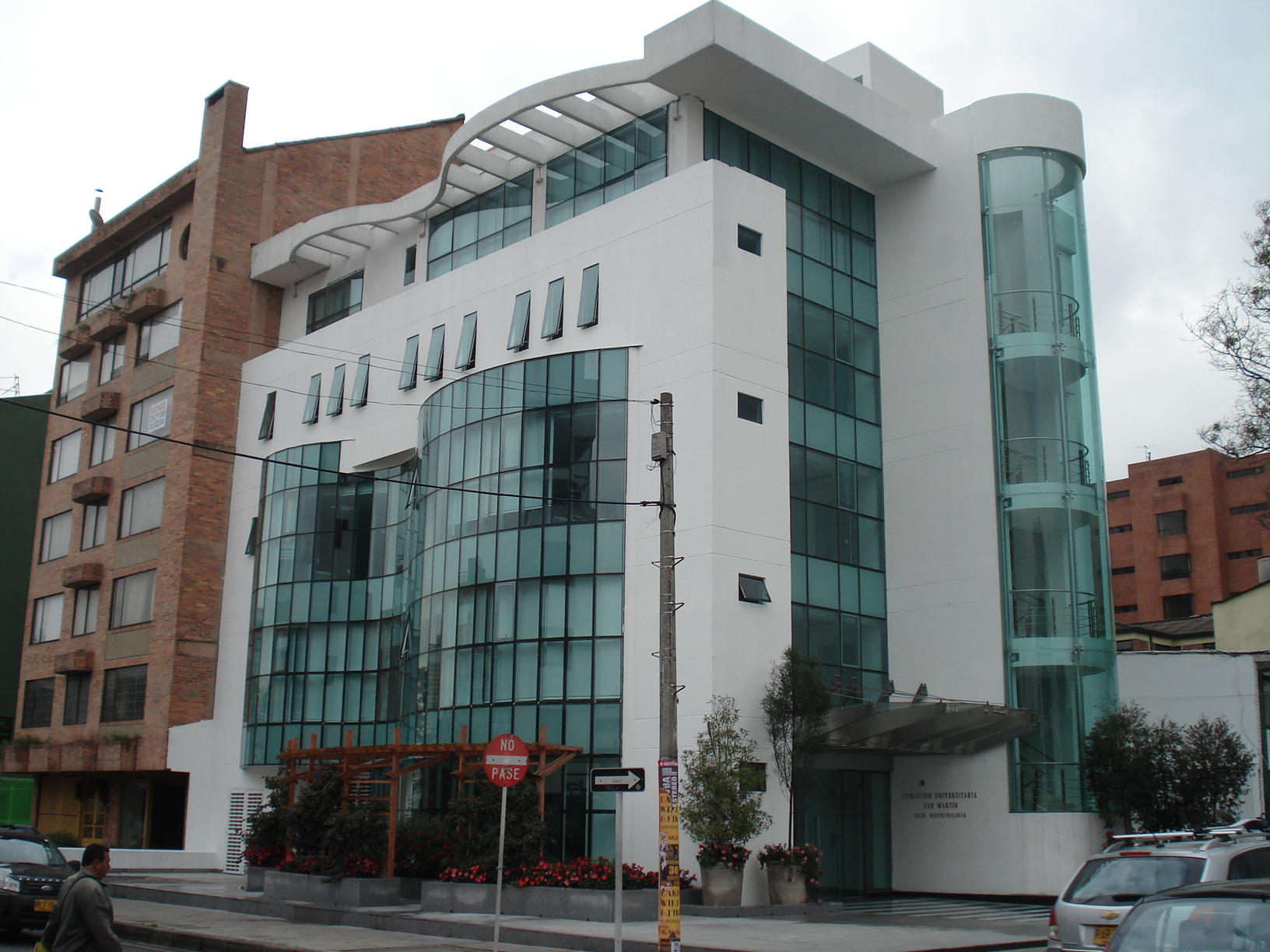
FUSM Bogotá, Secretaría General

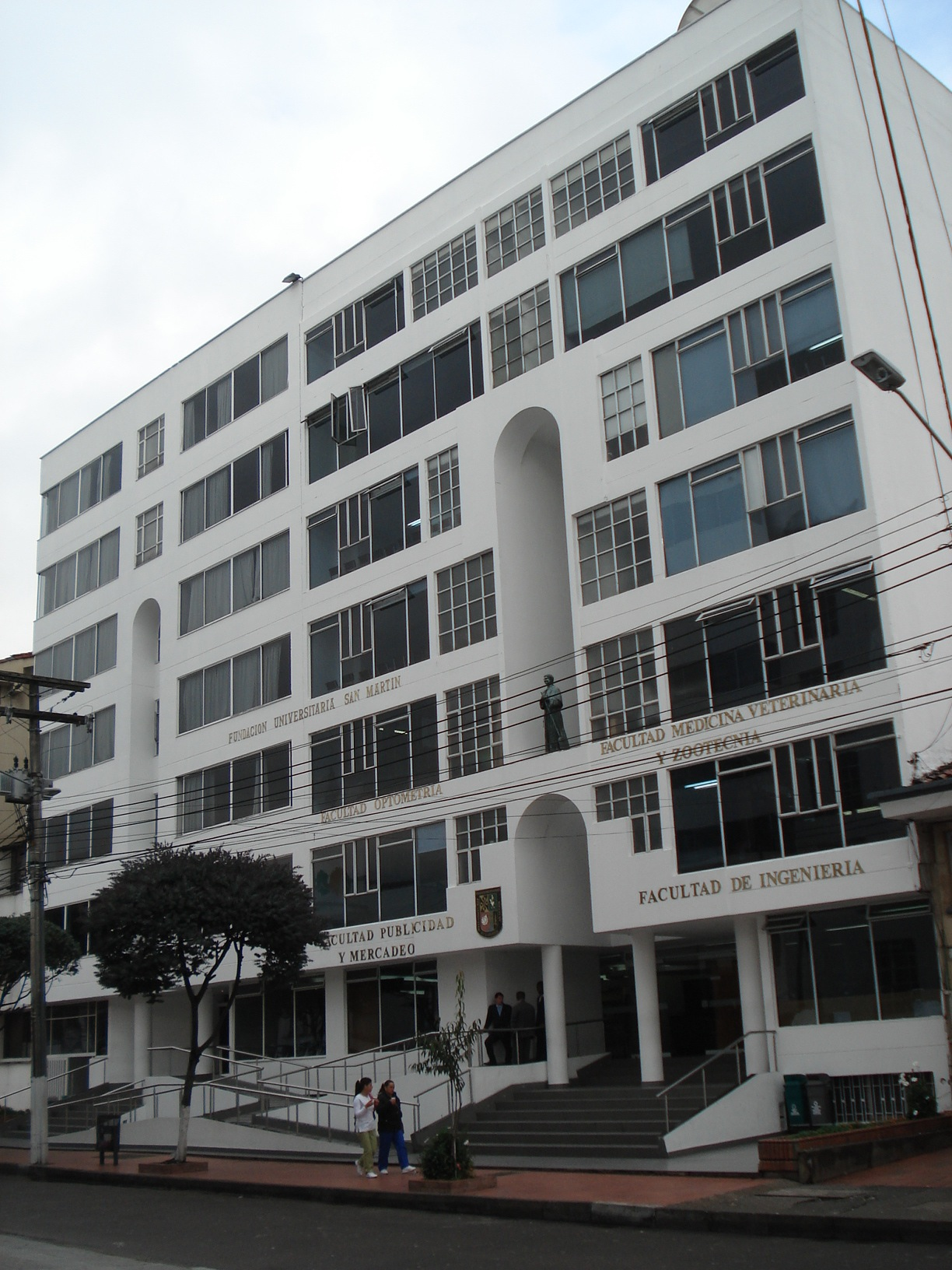
FUSM sede Bogotá, estatua de San Martín
