= Joint Commission on Allied Health Personnel in Ophthalmology =

Write your short description here

- Abbreviation: JCAHPO
- Formation: 1969
- Type: not for profit organization
- Location: United States Canada
- Website: www.jcahpo.org

The International Joint Commission on Allied Health Personnel in Ophthalmology (IJCAHPO) is an American nonprofit professional association for Allied Ophthalmic Personnel (AOP).

Founded in 1969, the IJCAHPO provides certification and education programs for persons in the ophthalmology field.

== Certification ==
IJCAHPO offers core professional certifications;

- Certified Ophthalmic Assistant (COA) – Entry Level
- Certified Ophthalmic Technician (COT) – Intermediate Level
- Certified Ophthalmic Medical Technologist (COMT) – Advanced Level

IJCAHPO specialty certifications include:

- Certified Diagnostic Ophthalmic Sonographer (CDOS)
- Registered Ophthalmic Ultrasound Biometrist (ROUB)
- Ophthalmic Surgical Assistant – Surgical Technician (OSA-ST)
- Corporate Certified Ophthalmic Assistant (CCOA)
- Ophthalmic Scribe Certification (OSC)

== Education ==
Annual Meeting - IJCAHPO holds a national Annual Continuing Education (ACE) program with Continuing Education (CE) courses and Learning Labs at the basic, intermediate, advanced, and master levels. The ACE program is held in conjunction with the American Academy of Ophthalmology (AAO) annual meeting.

Regional Meetings - IJCAHPO offers a series of one and two-day continuing education programs in the U.S. and Canada.

Distance Learning - IJCAHPO offers EyeCareCE, an on-demand e-learning website, featuring a library of courses that offer multiple certification credits. The IJCAHPO Webinar Series are live, online instructor lead courses that allow attendees to directly interact with the presenter and participate in real-time forums.

Tools and Resources - IJCAHPO publishes books, CD lecture packets, examination study materials, Learning Systems Series CDs, Refinements modules, and more. IJCAHPO also awards CE credits for courses and programs offered by other providers.

== Governance ==
IJCAHPO is managed by a Board of Directors consisting of 17 Directors. An Advisory Councilor is selected from each of the Regular and Affiliate Organizations.

=== Regular Organizational Council Representatives ===
- American Academy of Ophthalmology
- American Association for Pediatric Ophthalmology and Strabismus
- American Glaucoma Society
- American Ophthalmological Society
- American Society of Cataract & Refractive Surgery
- American Society of Ophthalmic Administrators
- American Society of Retina Specialists
- Association of Technical Personnel in Ophthalmology
- Association of University Professors of Ophthalmology
- Association of Veterans Affairs Ophthalmologists
- Canadian Ophthalmological Society
- Canadian Society of Ophthalmic Medical Personnel

=== Affiliate Organizational Council Representatives ===
- American Association of Certified Orthoptists
- American Orthoptic Council
- Ophthalmic Photographers' Society
- Philippine Academy of Ophthalmology
- The Canadian Orthoptic Society
- Pan-American Association of Ophthalmology
