= Capitol Medical Center Colleges =

Private medical school in Quezon CIty, Philippines

Capitol Medical Center Colleges, INC
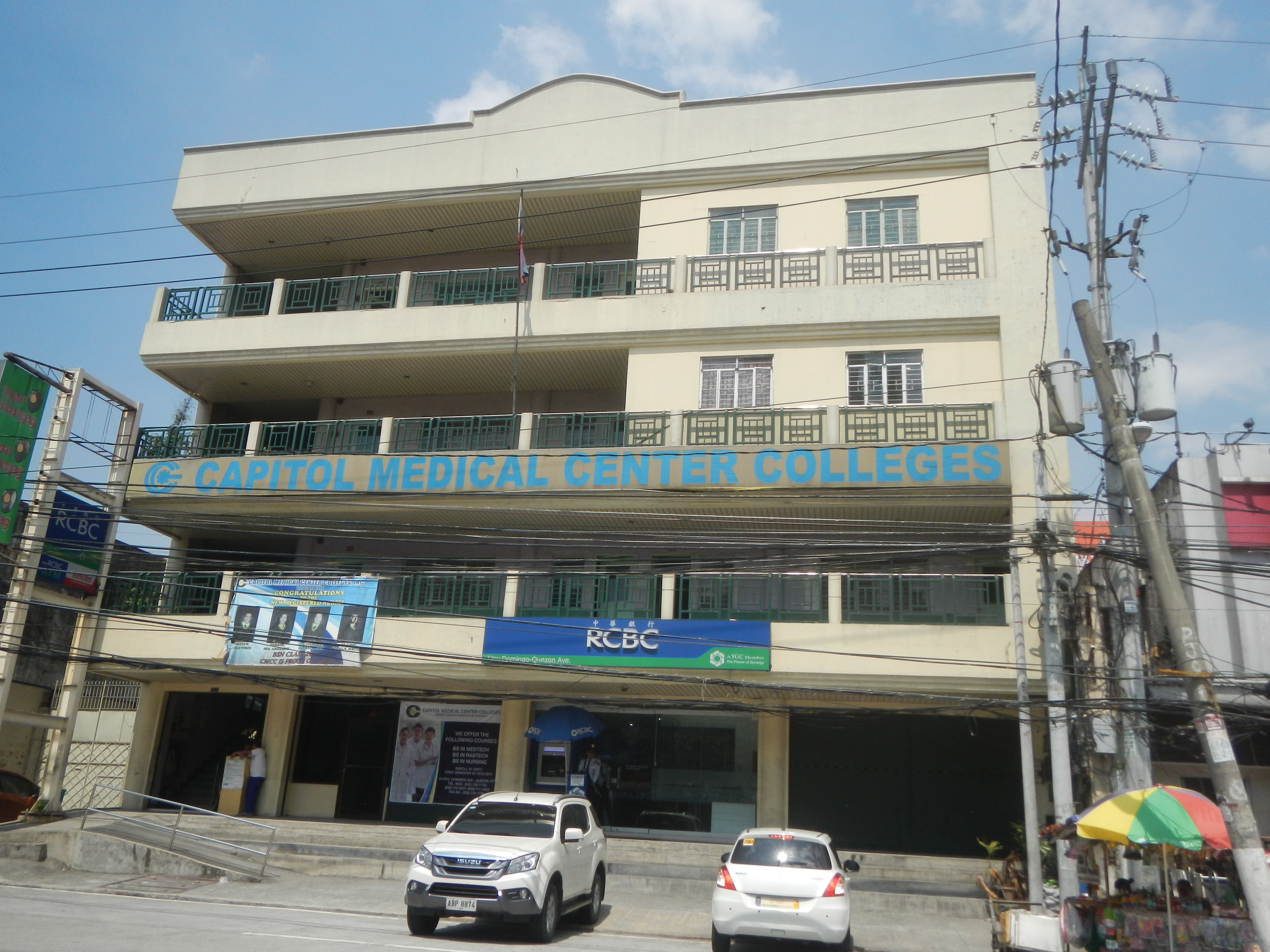
- Other name: CMCC
- Type: Private
- Established: 2004
- Dean: Mary Jane Cortez, RN, MAN
- Location: Quezon City, Metro Manila, Philippines; 14°38′06″N 121°01′17″E
- Location in Metro Manila Location in Luzon Location in the Philippines

Capitol Medical Center Colleges, Inc. is an accredited school in Quezon City, Philippines, operated in conjunction with Capitol Medical Center, a general hospital. It is also affiliated with the Philippine Orthopedic Center, the San Lazaro Hospital and the National Center for Mental Health.

== Courses offered ==
- Bachelor of Science in Nursing
- Bachelor of Science in Medical Technology
- Bachelor of Science in Radiologic Technology
