= The Institute of Optometry =

Optometry school in London

Coordinates: 51.4980°N 0.0986°W

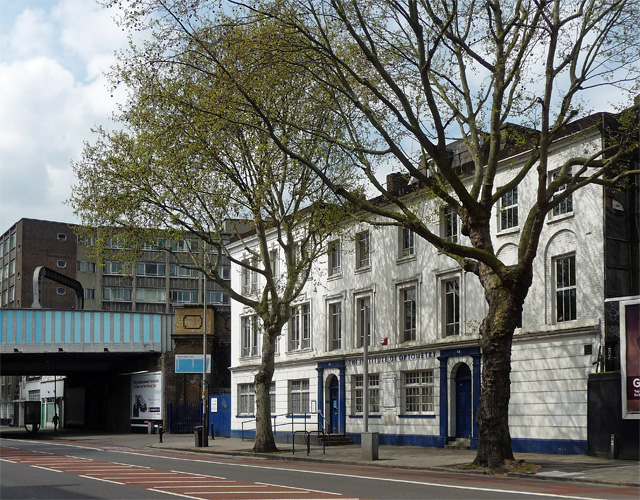
52-56 Newington Causeway

The Institute of Optometry was a centre for optometry, based in south London, England. It was established in 1922 as the London Refraction Hospital.

== History ==
=== London Refraction Hospital ===
The London Refraction Hospital (LRH) was formed in October 1922, the first institute of its kind in the world. The first committee of management consisted of Owen Aves (chairman), F.W. Bateman, J.H. Cuff, F.W. Dadd, G.E. Houghton and W. H. Nichols. The first secretary was F.T. Gregg. James Forrest, who was a surgeon oculist, was also involved in the founding.

The LRH was enlarged and re-modelled in October 1928 and re-opened in February 1929 by the Rt. Hon. the Countess of Mayo. In November 1938, the LRH was reconstituted by order of the Charity Commission.

The second Lord Charnwood was active in the management of the London Refraction Hospital after the second world war.

In 1985, it was suggested by Rishi Agarwal in 'Optometry Today' that in addition to making efforts for a Royal College of Optometrists, efforts should also be made for a Royal status for the LRH.

=== Institute of Optometry ===
In 1988, the LRH changed its name to the Institute of Optometry.

In 2008, the Institute of Optometry, in partnership with London South Bank University, established a post-graduate Doctor of Optometry programme. This was the first professional doctorate in optometry by that description offered in the UK, that was distinct from a traditional PhD.

=== Closure ===
Following the decision of Southwark Council to redevelop the area at which the institute was based the Institute closed.

=== Patient records ===
Patient records of the former Institute have been transferred to Crofton Park Opticians at 376 Brockley Road, London, SE4 2BY, (020 8692 8335)
