= Manual small incision cataract surgery =

Technique of surgical cataract extraction

- Other names: MSICS
- Specialty: Ophthalmology

Manual small incision cataract surgery (MSICS) is an evolution of extracapsular cataract extraction (ECCE); the lens is removed from the eye through a self-sealing scleral tunnel wound. A well-constructed scleral tunnel is held closed by internal pressure, is watertight, and does not require suturing. The wound is relatively smaller than that in ECCE but is still markedly larger than a phacoemulsification wound. Comparative trials of MSICS against phaco in dense cataracts have found no statistically significant difference in outcomes but MSICS had shorter operating times and significantly lower costs. MSICS has become the method of choice in the developing world because it provides high-quality outcomes with less surgically induced astigmatism than ECCE, no suture-related problems, quick rehabilitation, and fewer post-operative visits. MSICS is easy and fast to learn for the surgeon, cost effective, simple, and applicable to almost all types of cataract.

== Description ==
MSICS is a procedure that was developed to reduce costs in comparison with phacoemulsification, which requires expensive high-tech equipment that needs skilled maintenance, and is relatively unsuited to less developed regions, and to eliminate the need for suturing the incision, by using a self-sealing incision. This reduces operating time, and for some geometries of incision, considerably reduces surgery induced astigmatism, or induces a reduction in pre-surgery astigmatism. The procedure is fast, economical, effective, and produces results statistically similar to phaco surgery. It is extensively used in less developed countries and regions, with good outcomes.

== Contraindications ==
The same general contraindications for cataract surgery apply. Specific contraindications for MSICS include hard or dense cataracts where the nucleus is too large for the MSICS incision; and in cases where the nucleus is found to be deformed on a nanophthalmic (very small) eye. (Note: Nanophthalmic: Exceptionally small eyes.)

== Preparation and precautions ==
Preparation may begin three-to-seven days before surgery with the preoperative application of NSAIDs and antibiotic eye drops. The pupil is dilated using drops if the IOL is to be placed behind the iris to help better visualise the cataract and for easier access.

=== Anaesthesia ===
Anaesthesia may be placed topically as eyedrops or injected next to (peribulbar) or behind (retrobulbar) the eye or sub-tenons. Local anaesthetic nerve blocking has been recommended to facilitate surgery. Topical anaesthetics may be used at the same time as an intracameral lidocaine injection to reduce pain during the operation. Oral or intravenous sedation may also be used to reduce anxiety. General anaesthesia is rarely necessary but may be used for children and adults with medical or psychiatric issues affecting their ability to remain still during the procedure.

=== Site preparation ===
The operation may occur on a stretcher or a reclining examination chair. The eyelids and surrounding skin are swabbed with a disinfectant, such as 10% povidone-iodine, and topical povidone-iodine is put in the eye. The face is covered with a cloth or sheet with an opening for the operative eye. The eyelid is held open with a speculum to minimize blinking during surgery. Pain is usually minimal in properly anaesthetised eyes, though a pressure sensation and discomfort from the bright operating microscope light is common. Bridle sutures (Note: Bridle suture: A suture passing through the superior rectus muscle of the eye, used to rotate the eyeball downwards in eye surgery.) may be used to help to stabilize the eyeball during sclerocorneal tunnel incision, and during extraction of the nucleus and epinucleus through the tunnel.

== Surgical technique ==
A defining characteristic of this technique is in the incision made for access to the cataract, which is smaller than for ECCE, and larger than for phacoemulsification, but like phaco, the wound is self sealing due to its geometry.

=== Incision ===
The small incision into the anterior chamber of the eye is made at or near the corneal limbus, where the cornea and sclera meet, either superior or temporal. Advantages of the smaller incision include use of few-or-no stitches and shortened recovery time. The "small" incision is small in comparison with the earlier ECCE incision but considerably larger than the phaco incision. The precise geometry of the incision is important as it affects the self-sealing of the wound and the amount of astigmatism caused by distortion of the cornea during healing. A sclerocorneal or scleral tunnel incision is commonly used, which reduces induced astigmatism if suitably formed. A sclerocorneal tunnel, a three-phase incision, starts with a shallow incision perpendicular to the sclera, followed by an incision through the sclera and cornea approximately parallel to the outer surface, and then a beveled incision into the anterior chamber. This structure provides the self-sealing characteristic because internal pressure presses together the faces of the incision.

==== Incision geometries and their characteristics ====
The incision provides access to the interior of the anterior chanber for access to the lens, a passage for removal of the lens, and a passage for insertion of the IOL. The primary characteristic of scleral tunnel incisions is self sealing, which is a consequence of the location relative to the limbus, and the shape of the wound, which also influences the post operative astigmatism.

The characteristics of an incision that is reliably self-sealing include:

- Approximately square incisional geometry – the length and width of the incision surfaces are roughly equal,
- The external incision opening is narrower than the internal opening with a tunnel that flares between them,
- An external incision shape that allows some stretch,
- The incision must extent at least a millimetre into the cornea, and follow the curve of the edge of the cornea.

The size of the incision, i.e. the straight line distance between the ends of the external opening, is determined primarily by the expected size of the nucleus, and secondarily by the size of the IOL, and is usually between 5 and 8 mm. The distance between the outer opening of the tunnel and the inner opening should be at least 4 mm for a good seal. The shape of the outer opening may be straight or curved, and will affect astigmatism and the tendency for wound edge separation. A small flap of the conjunctiva is folded back before making the initial incision perpendicular to the sclera.

The "frown" form is a curve with the ends further from the limbus than the middle, and has a lesser tendency to induce astigmatism or separate on the outside edge.

A straight incision follows a great circle route across the sclera, with the ends equidistant from the edge of the cornea. This induces moderate astigmatism.

Blumenthal side cuts are short cuts at the ends of a straight incision which angle obliquely away from the cornea. This induces minimal astigmatism and is used for a wide tunnel.

A "smile" incision is parallel to the edge of the cornea. It is an easy incision but induces more astigmatism and is more prone to separation.

The "chevron" incision is much like the frown but comprises two straight lines of equal length. This shape induces minimal astigmatism.

The tunnel extends from the scleral incision approximately parallel to the outer surface, and slightly deeper than half the thickness of the sclera, and should extend at least a millimetre into the cornea. The inner edge should follow the curve of the corneal edge.

As the incision heals, the meridian along which the wound is centered tends to progressively flatten, which may continue for up to 3 weeks until healing is complete. The geometry of the incision may be chosen to permanently reduce pre-operative refractive error, or maintain original cornea shape.

=== Maintaining the eye shape ===
The depth of the anterior chamber and position of the posterior capsule may be maintained during surgery by OVDs or an anterior chamber maintainer, which is an auxiliary cannula providing a sufficient flow of BSS to maintain the stability of the shape of the chamber and internal pressure.

=== Capsulorhexis ===
Using an instrument called a cystotome, an anterior capsulotomy, also known as a cystotomy, is made to open the front surface of the lens capsule, giving access to the lens. The continuous curvilinear capsulorhexis technique is in common use, and is preferred as it produces a tougher edge without stress raisers and is less likely to tear further during the procedure. A posterior capsulotomy is an opening of the back portion of the lens capsule, which is not usually necessary or desirable unless it has opacified. The types of capsular openings commonly used in MSICS are the continuous curvilinear capsulorhexis, the can-opener capsulotomy, and the envelope capsulotomy.

=== Extraction of the lens ===
The cataract is removed from the capsule and anterior chamber using hydroexpression (Note: Hydroexpression: Method of removing the lens from the capsule and anterior chamber by carrying it out in a flow of saline solution.) viscoexpression, (Note: Viscoexpression: Method of removing the lens from the capsule and anterior chamber by carrying it out in a flow of viscoelastic material.) or more-direct mechanical methods.

The extraction of the cataract must be done with due care so as not to compromise the integrity of the tunnel; the endothelium and capsule are also vulnerable to injury. Bisection, trisection and fragmentation into more pieces is possible, but all must be removed. The pressure in the eye can be maintained at the desired level by using an anterior chamber maintainer, or may be allowed to drop to ambient atmospheric pressure. Larger well-structured tunnels and larger capsulorhexis are acceptable to allow better control of the surgery.

Various methods may be used:

Management with irrigating vectis: (Note: Irrigating vectis: A form of rigid cannula with a loop at the end which can support the nucleus, and which has one or more holes at the distal end, through which BSS or viscoelastic material can be introduced.) Hydrodissection is performed until a part of the nucleus prolapses into the anterior chamber, or the surgeon hooks and lifts the nucleus edge, and rotates it until it prolapses into the anterior chamber. The nucleus is then removed through the tunnel using an irrigating vectis. Viscoelastic is injected above and below the nucleus to protect the endothelium. A bridle suture is used to steady the globe. The irrigating vectis is inserted under the nucleus, then withdrawn towards the tunnel until the nucleus starts to enter the tunnel. At this point BSS is injected into the chamber through the vectis to provide pressure to expel the nucleus while the vectis is withdrawn with it. An iris spatula may be used in the sandwich technique, where the spatula is used to hold the nucleus against the vectis.

Alternatively, the nucleus may be guided out of the eye through the tunnel with the help of a Sheet's glide, (Note: Sheets glide: A sheets glide, glide sheet, or lens glide is a thin disposable strip of low friction material inserted into the incision to protect the wound surfaces while extracting a lens or lens fragment, or inserting an IOL. [Sheets JH, Maida JW. Lens glide in implant surgery. Arch Ophthalmol. 1978 Jan;96(1):145-6. doi: 10.1001/archopht.1978.03910050095024. PMID 623543].) and pushed out by internal pressure induced by adding saline from the anterior chamber maintainer or injecting viscoelastic into the chamber. The nucleus may be broken into a few pieces to aid removal, or removed in one piece.

Phacosection is the division of the nucleus into two or three narrower parts. This avoids stretching the tunnel and thereby reduces surgically induced astigmatism and possible damage to the endothelium. The epinucleus and most of the cortex are divided and removed along with the nucleus.

Preparation for phacosection is by hydrodissection to separate the cortex from the capsule, but hydrodelineation is not done and the entire lens is carefully released from the capsule and removed into the anterior chamber through the capsulorhexis opening, avoiding stress on the zonules. The lens is then divided into narrower sections by any one of several possible methods, and the sections are then extracted individually. The epinucleus and most of the cortex remain attached to the nucleus, and get removed with it during these maneuvers.

=== Prosthetic lens insertion ===
Following cataract removal, an IOL is usually inserted into the posterior capsule. When the posterior capsule is damaged, the IOL may be inserted into the ciliary sulcus, or a glued intraocular lens technique may be applied. It is economical to use a rigid IOL if the incision size is already over 6 mm wide, but foldable IOLs can also be used if cost is not a limiting factor or incision size is <5 mm.

=== Removal of OVDs ===
After the IOL is inserted, ophthalmic viscosurgical devices are aspirated or flushed out and replaced with BSS. Residues of OVDs can cause raised intraocular pressure (IOP) by blocking the trabecular meshwork until they dissipate. IOP spikes can cause damage to the optic nerve and visual disturbances in patients with glaucoma. Postoperative endophthalmitis is also associated with OVD residue.

=== Wound sealing ===
The surgeon checks the incision does not leak fluid because wound leakage increases the risk of microorganisms gaining access into the eye and predisposing it to endophthalmitis. An antibiotic/steroid combination eye drop is put in, and an eye shield may be applied, sometimes supplemented with an eye patch. A well constructed scleral tunnel should be self-sealing, but if it does not seal sufficiently, one or more sutures will be added.

=== Contingency procedures ===
A change from MSICS to ECCE is appropriate when the nucleus is too large for the MSICS incision; and in cases where the nucleus is found to be deformed during MSICS on a nanophthalmic (very small) eye.

== Complications ==
Complications can develop during and after surgery.

=== During surgery ===
Posterior capsular rupture, a tear in the posterior capsule of the natural lens, is the most-common complication during cataract surgery. Posterior capsule rupture can cause lens fragments to be retained, corneal oedema, and cystoid macular oedema; it is also associated with increased risk of endophthalmitis and retinal detachment. It may make it necessary to place the IOL outside the capsular bag.

Suprachoroidal hemorrhage is a rare complication.

Intraoperative floppy iris syndrome has an incidence of around 0.5% to 2.0%. Iris or ciliary body injury has an incidence of about 0.6%-1.2%. In the event of a posterior capsule rupture, fragments of the nucleus can find their way through the tear into the vitreous chamber; this is called posterior dislocation of nuclear fragments.

=== After surgery ===
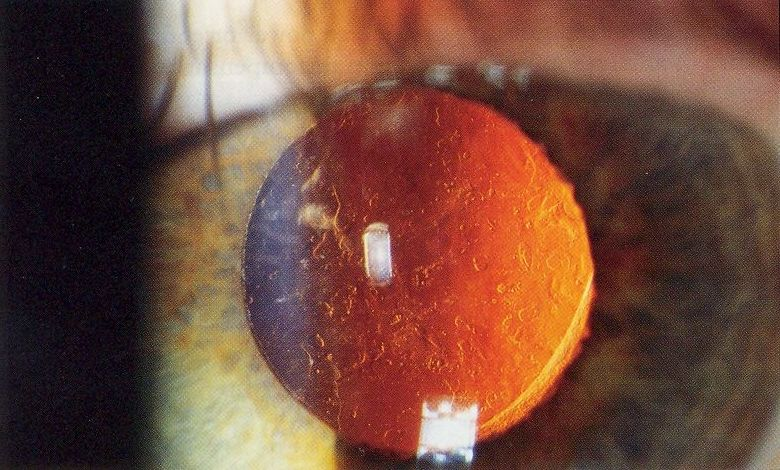
Slit lamp photo of IOL showing Posterior capsular opacification (PCO) visible a few months after implantation of intraocular lens in eye, seen on retroillumination

Complications after cataract surgery are relatively uncommon. Posterior vitreous detachment (PVD) may occur but does not directly threaten vision.

Some people develop a posterior capsular opacification (PCO), also called an after-cataract. This may compromise visual acuity, and can usually be safely and painlessly corrected using a laser. to create a clear central visual axis.

Patients who have had cataract surgery are at an increased risk of developing rhegmatogenous retinal detachment (RRD)—the most-common form of retinal detachment. Toxic anterior segment syndrome (TASS), a non-infectious inflammatory condition, may occur following cataract surgery.

Endophthalmitis is a serious infection of the intraocular tissues, usually following intraocular surgery complications or penetrating trauma, and one of the most-severe. It is rare in cataract surgery due to the use of prophylactic antibiotics. Hypopyon occurs about 80% of the time.

Glaucoma may occur and may be very difficult to control. It is usually associated with inflammation, especially when small fragments or chunks of the nucleus access the vitreous cavity.

Mechanical pupillary block can occur when contact between the edge of the pupil and an adjacent structure blocks the flow of aqueous through the pupil. This is more frequent as a complication of anterior chamber intraocular lens implantation, but has been known to occasionally occur with posterior IOL implantation.

Swelling of the macula, the central part of the retina, results in macular oedema and can occur a few days or weeks after surgery. Most such cases can be successfully treated. Uveitis–glaucoma–hyphema syndrome is a complication caused by the mechanical irritation of a mis-positioned IOL over the iris, ciliary body or iridocorneal angle.

Other possible complications include Elevated intraocular pressure; swelling or oedema of the cornea; displacement or dislocation of the IOL implant (rare); unplanned high refractive error—either myopic or hypermetropic—due to error in the ultrasonic biometry (measurement of the eye length and calculation of the required intraocular lens power); cyanopsia, in which the patient's vision is tinted blue and often occurs for a few days, weeks or months after removal of a cataract; and floaters, which commonly appear after surgery.

== Recovery and rehabilitation ==
Following cataract surgery, side-effects such as grittiness, watering, blurred vision, double vision or a red or bloodshot eye may occur, and will usually clear after a few days. Full recovery can take four-to-six weeks. Patients are usually advised to avoid getting water in the eye during the first week after surgery, and to avoid swimming for two-to-three weeks as a conservative approach, to minimise risk of bacterial infection. Patients should avoid driving for at least 24 hours after the surgery, largely due to effects from the anaesthesia, possible swelling affecting focus, and pupil dilation causing excessive glare. At the first post-operative check, the surgeon will usually assess whether vision is suitable for driving.

After surgery, to prevent contamination, the eyes should not be rubbed and the use of eye makeup, face cream or lotions should be avoided. Excessive dust, wind, pollen or dirt should also be avoided. Sunglasses should be worn on bright days because the eyes will be more sensitive to bright light for a while.

Topical anti-inflammatory drugs and antibiotics are commonly used in the form of eye-drops to reduce the risk of inflammation and infection. A shield or eye-patch may be prescribed to protect the eye while sleeping. The eye will be checked to ensure the IOL remains in place, and once it has fully stabilised, after about six weeks, vision tests will be used to check whether prescription lenses are needed. Where the focal length of the IOL is optimised for distance vision, reading glasses will generally be needed for near focus. The patient should not participate in contact or extreme sports or similar activities until cleared to do so by the eye surgeon.

== Outcomes ==
After full recovery, visual acuity depends on the underlying condition of the eye, the choice of IOL, and any long-term complications associated with the surgery. More than 90% of operations are successful in restoring useful vision, with a low complication rate. Comparing the surgery with phacoemulsification, MSICS patients report better visual outcomes.

== History ==
MSICS was a later development in cataract surgery after phacoemulsification was already established. It is a technique which does not rely on high tech and expensive equipment, and is not much used in Western countries. In developing countries where cost is a more significant factor in limiting access to medical support, and the necessary maintenance for phaco equimpment may not be available or convenient, MSICS is a cost-effective alternative with comparable outcomes.

Self-sealing cataract incisions were mentioned by R. P. Kratz et al. in 1980 and by L. J. Girard in 1984. Kratz described the tunnel as an astigmatically neutral way of accessing the anterior chamber. In 1984, B. H. Thrasher et al. showed that incision position relative to the limbus has a strong effect on surgically induced astigmatism, as a 9 mm posterior incision induces less astigmatism than a 6 mm limbal incision.

In 1987, M. Blumenthal and J. Moissiev described the use of the anterior chamber maintainer (ACM) in ECCE, which combined with a reduction in incision size can keep the eye at a normal internal pressure during surgery.

In 1990, Michael McFarland developed a sutureless incision geometry, and S. L. Pallin described a chevron shaped incision for sutureless closure. In 1991, J. A. Singer described the "frown" incision as a way to minimise asigmatism when using a rigid IOL.

In 1999, S. Ruit et al. described a technique using a 6.5–7 mm temporal scleral tunnel with a straight incision 2 mm from the limbus. A V-shaped capsulorhexis was followed by hydrodissection, and the nucleus was delivered by viscoexpression. The cortical residue was aspirated and an IOL was implanted in the capsular bag.

Around 2009 P. Kosakarn developed a technique of manual phacofragmentation called double-nylon loop, by which the lens is divided into three pieces so that the incision can be smaller and sutureless, and which allows implantation of foldable IOL to be implanted.

K.P. Malik et al. modified the MSICS technique c2016 by a continuous infusion of 2% hydroxymethyl cellulose through the AC maintainer during nuclear delivery to prevent corneal endothelial cell loss.

== See also ==
- Africa Cataract Project – Turkish non-governmental organization
- Eye surgery – Surgery performed on the eye or its adnexa
- Himalayan Cataract Project – U.S. nonprofit organization
- IOLVIP – Intraocular lens system to compensate for macular degeneration
- Ophthalmology – Field of medicine treating eye disorders
- Phacoemulsification – Method of cataract surgery
