= Cataract surgery =

Removal of opacified lens from the eye

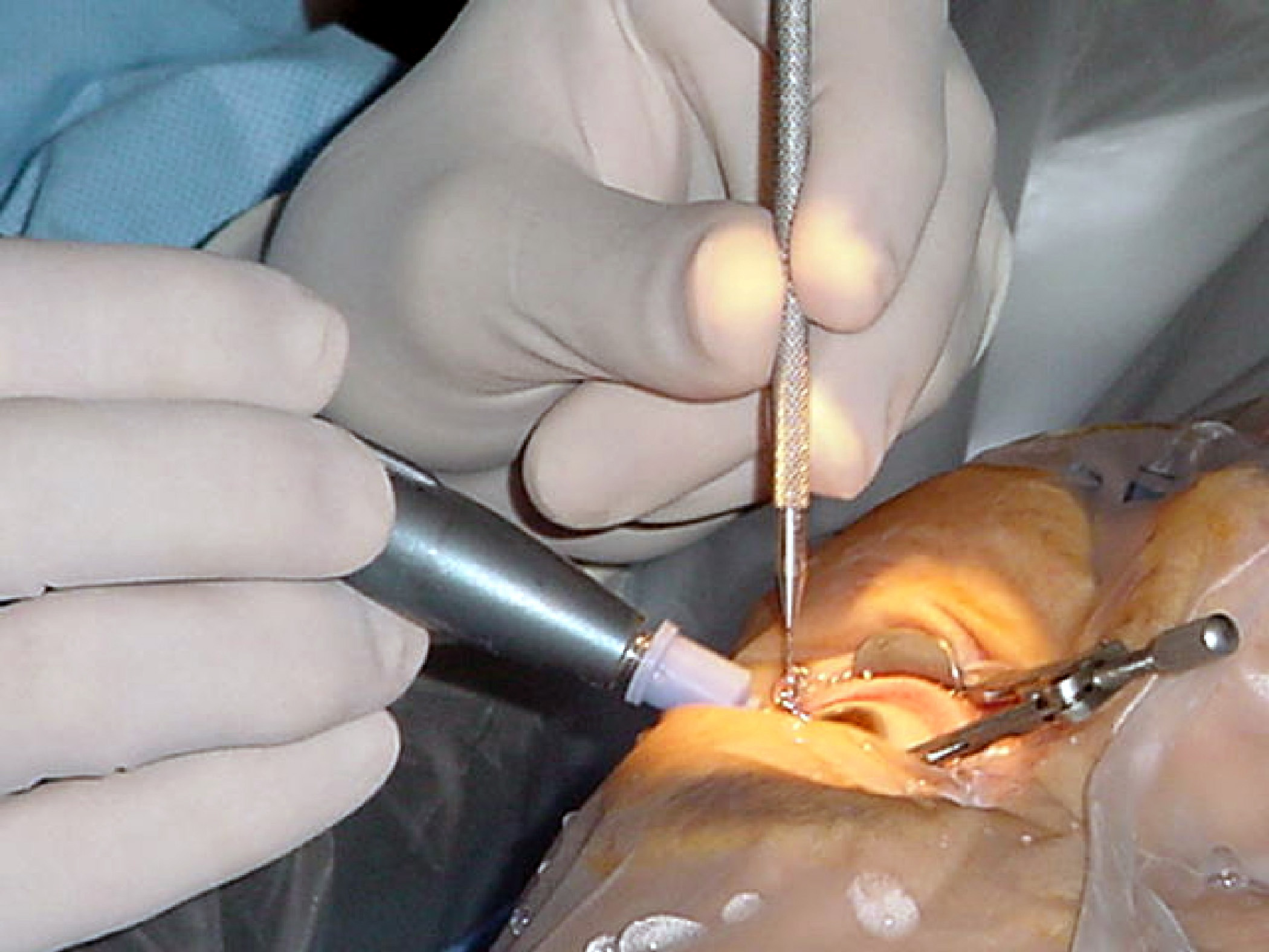
- Cataract surgery, using a temporal approach phacoemulsification probe (in right hand) and "chopper" (in left hand)
- Specialty: Ophthalmology
- Uses: Removal of opacified lens from eye to restore vision.
- Types: Phacoemulsification, manual small incision cataract surgery, extracapsular cataract extraction, intracapsular cataract extraction
- Frequency: Hundreds to thousands per million population per year.
- Outcomes: Restoration of useful vision or significant improvement in most cases
- ICD-9-CM: 13.19
- MeSH: D002387
- MedlinePlus: 002957

Cataract surgery is the removal of the natural lens of the eye that has developed a cataract, an opaque or cloudy area. The eye's natural lens is usually replaced with an artificial intraocular lens (IOL) implant.

Over time, metabolic changes of the crystalline lens fibres lead to the development of a cataract, causing impairment or loss of vision. Some infants are born with congenital cataracts, and environmental factors may lead to cataract formation. Early symptoms may include glare from lights, especially at night, blunting of colors in vision and reduced visual acuity at low light levels.

During cataract surgery, the cloudy natural lens is removed from the posterior chamber of the eye, either by emulsification in place or by manual removal. An IOL (intraocular lens) is usually implanted in its place (PCIOL), or less frequently in the cilliary sulcus, to restore clear vision. Cataract surgery is performed by an ophthalmologist in an out-patient setting at a surgical centre or hospital. Local anaesthesia (injection) or topical anesthesia (drops) are normally used. The procedure is usually quick and causes little or no pain and minor discomfort. Recovery sufficient for most daily activities usually takes place in days, and full recovery takes about a month.

Well over 90% of operations are successful in restoring useful vision, and there is a low complication rate. Same day, minimally invasive, small-incision phacoemulsification with quick post-operative recovery has become the standard of care of cataract surgery in much of the world. Manual small incision cataract surgery (MSICS), which is considerably more economical in capital equipment and consumables, and provides comparable results, is popular in the developing world. Both procedures have a low risk of serious complications, and are the definitive treatment for vision impairment due to cataract.

== Uses ==
Magnified view of a cataract seen on examination with a slit lamp

Cataract surgery is used to remove the natural lens of the eye when it has developed a cataract, (a cloudy area in the lens that causes visual impairment). Cataracts usually develop slowly and can affect one or both eyes. Early symptoms may include faded colours, blurred or double vision, halos around lights, sensitivity to glare from bright lights, and night blindness. Blindness can be the end result. The procedure is normally elective, but lens removal may be part of trauma surgery in cases where the eye is severely injured. The lens is usually replaced by an intraocular implant when this is reasonably practicable, as removal of the lens also removes the ability of the eye to focus at from one distance to another.

Cataracts most commonly occur due to aging, but may also be caused by trauma or radiation exposure, be present since birth, or may develop as a complication of eye surgery intended to solve other health problems. Cataracts form when clumps of proteins or yellow-brown pigment accumulate in the lens, which reduces transmission of light to the retina at the back of the eye. Cataracts can be diagnosed via an eye examination.

Early symptoms of cataract may be improved by wearing appropriate glasses; if this does not help, cataract surgery is the only effective treatment. Surgery with implants generally results in better vision and an improved quality of life: however, the procedure is not readily available in many countries.

== Techniques ==
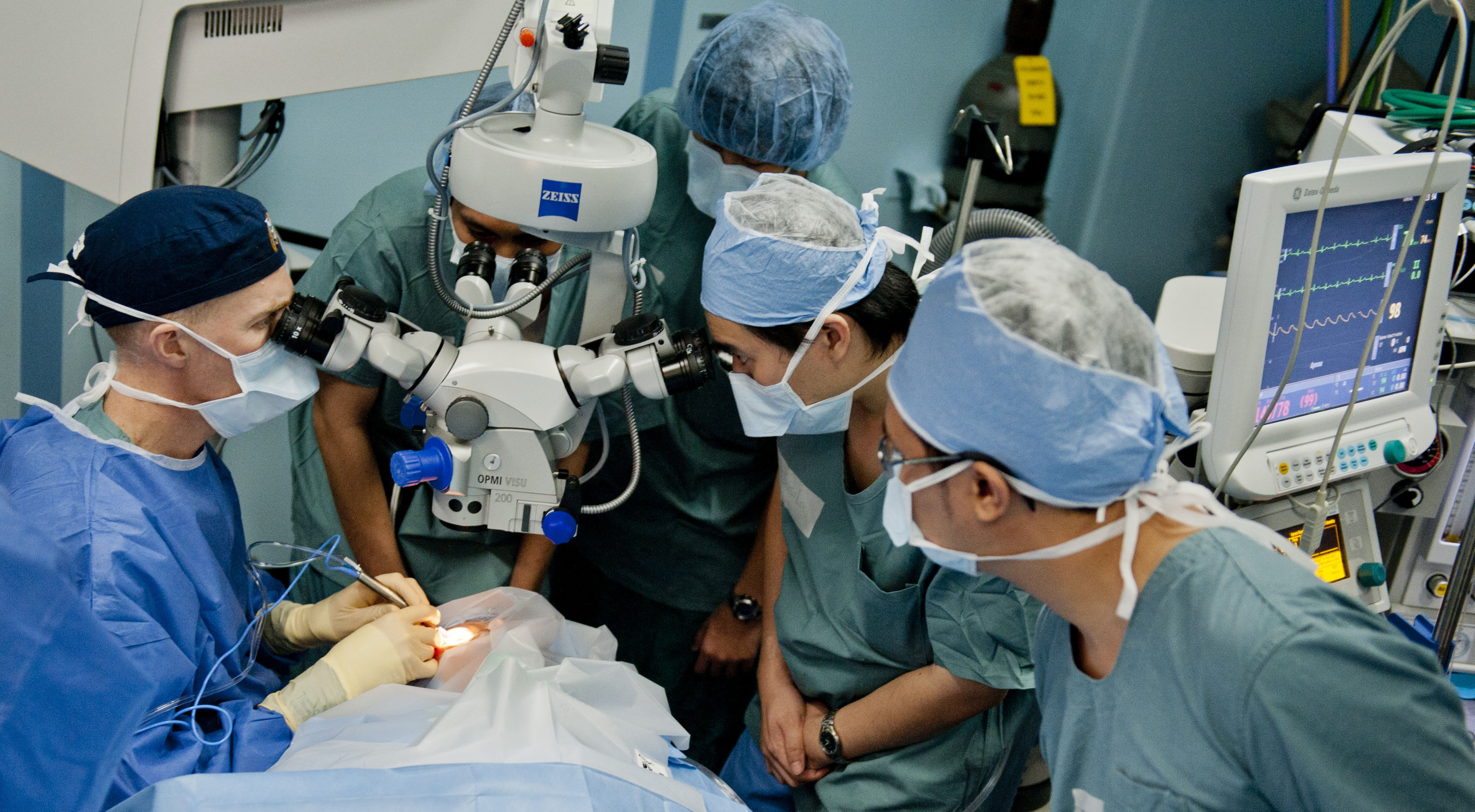
Cataract surgery using a surgical microscope

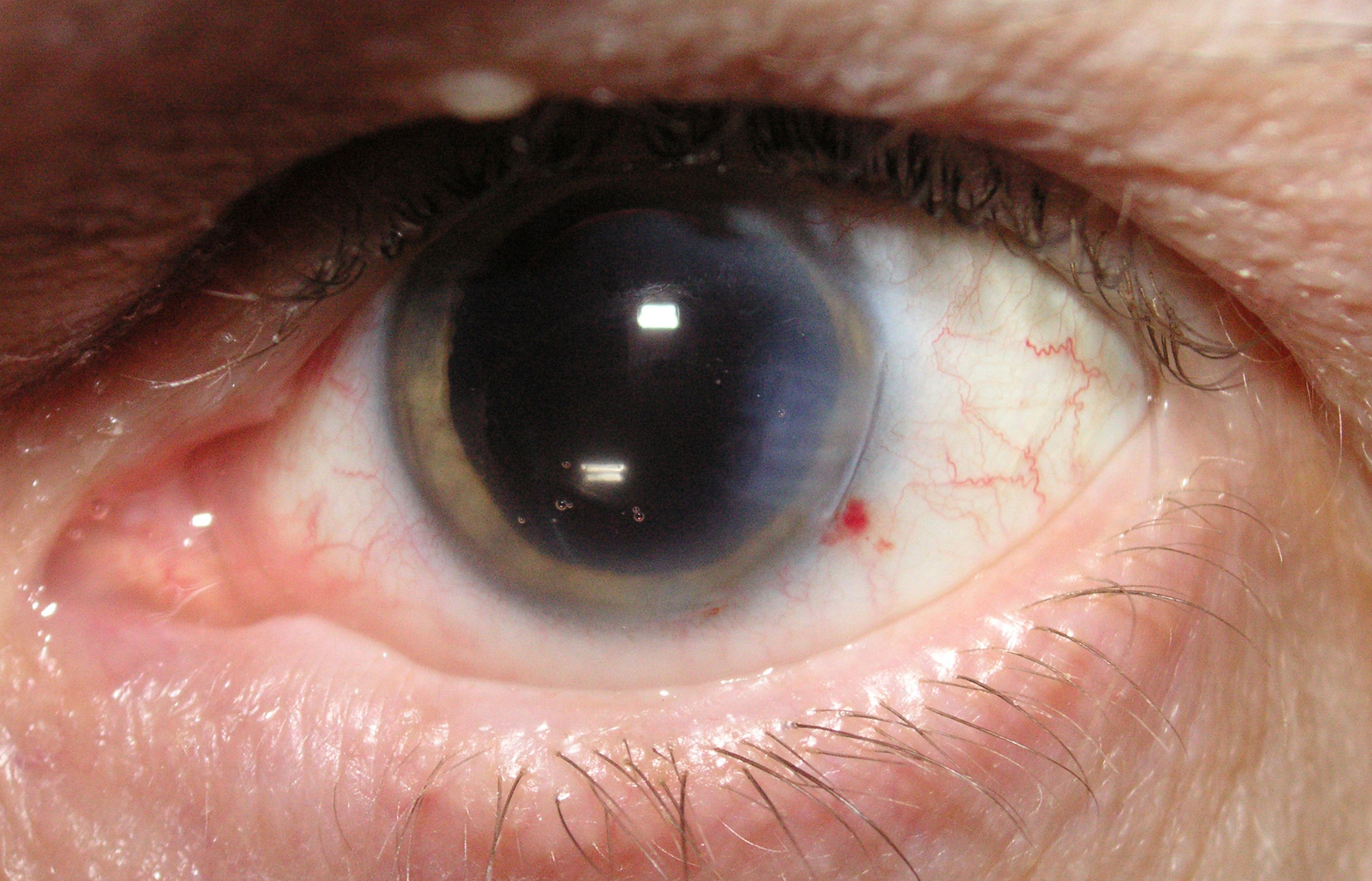
Cataract surgery recently performed, foldable IOL inserted. A small incision and very slight hemorrhage are visible to the right of the still dilated pupil.

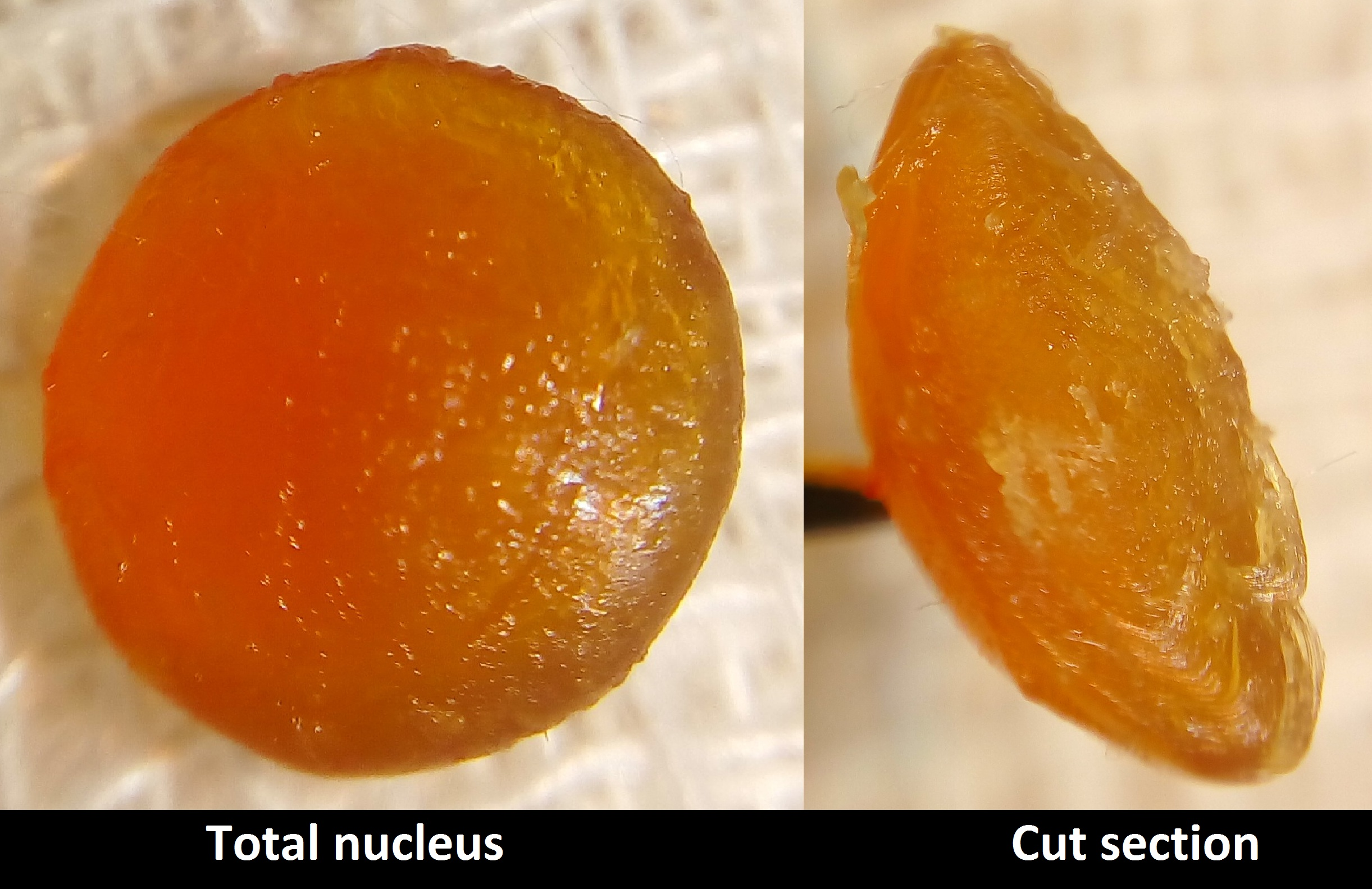
Nucleus of a mature cataract removed by extracapsular cataract extraction (ECCE)

Two main classes of cataract surgical procedures are currently in common use throughout the world: phacoemulsification, and extracapsular cataract extraction. Intracapsular cataract extraction has been superseded where the facilities for surgery under a microscope are available except for cases where the lens capsule cannot be retained, and couching is no longer used in mainstream medicine.

In phacoemulsification (phaco), the natural lens is fragmented by an ultrasonic probe and removed by suction. A more recent and less common variation of this, femtosecond laser-assisted phacoemulsification surgery, uses a laser to make the corneal incision, execute the capsulotomy, which provides access to the lens, and initiate lens fragmentation, which reduces energy requirements for phacoemulsification. The small incision size used in phacoemulsification generally allows for sutureless incision closure.

In extracapsular cataract extraction (ECCE), and its variation manual small incision cataract surgery (MSICS), the lens is removed from its capsule and manually extracted from the eye, either whole or after being split into a small number of substantial pieces. The basic version of ECCE uses a larger incision of 10–12 mm (0.39–0.47 in) and usually requires stitches. This requirement led to the variation known as MSICS, which does not usually need stitches as the incision should be self sealing under internal pressure due to its geometry.

Comparative trials of MSICS against phaco in dense cataracts have found no significant difference in outcomes, although MSICS had shorter operating times and significantly lower costs. MSICS has been prioritized as the method of choice in developing countries, because it provides high-quality outcomes with less surgically-induced astigmatism than standard ECCE, no suture-related problems, quick rehabilitation, and fewer post-operative visits. MSICS is generally easy and fast to learn for the surgeon, cost-effective and applicable to almost all types of cataract. ECCE using a large incision has largely become a contingency procedure to deal with complications during surgery and for managing cataracts expected to be difficult extractions.

In most surgeries, an IOL is inserted. Foldable lenses are generally used for the 2–3 mm (0.08–0.12 in) phaco incision, while non-foldable lenses can be placed through the larger extracapsular incision.

Intracapsular cataract extraction (ICCE) is the removal of the lens and the surrounding lens capsule in one piece. The procedure has a relatively high rate of complications in comparison to techniques in which the capsule is retained in place, due to the large incision required, pressure placed on the vitreous body when removing the encapsulated lens, and the removal of the barrier between the chambers of the eye, allowing easier migration of vitreous into the anterior chamber. It has therefore been largely superseded and is rarely performed in countries where operating microscopes and high-technology equipment are readily available. After lens removal by ICCE, an intraocular lens implant can be placed in either the anterior chamber or sutured into the ciliary sulcus. (Note: Ciliary sulcus: The space between the anterior surface of the ciliary body and the posterior surface of the base of the iris, just in front of the position of the natural lens.) Cryoextraction is a technique used in ICCE to extract the lens using a cryoprobe, the refrigerated tip of which adheres to the tissue of the lens at the contact point by freezing with a cryogenic substance such as liquid nitrogen, facilitating its removal. Cryoextraction may still be used for the removal of subluxated (partially dislocated) lenses.

Couching is the earliest documented form of cataract surgery. It involves dislodging the lens of the eye, removing the cataract from the optical axis, but leaving it inside the eye. The lens is not replaced and the eye cannot focus at any distance.

Phacoemulsification is the most commonly performed cataract procedure in the developed world, but the high capital and maintenance costs of a phacoemulsification machine and of the associated disposable equipment, have made ECCE and MSICS the most commonly performed procedures in developing countries. Cataract surgery is commonly done as an out-patient or day-care procedure, which is less expensive than hospitalisation and an overnight stay, and day surgery has similar medical outcomes.

== Pre-operative evaluation ==
An eye examination or pre-operative evaluation is done to confirm the presence of a cataract and to determine the patient's suitability for surgery:

- The degree of reduction of vision due largely to the cataract is evaluated. While the existence of other sight-threatening diseases, such as age-related macular degeneration or glaucoma, does not preclude cataract surgery, less improvement may be expected in their presence.
- In cases of uncontrolled glaucoma, a combined cataract-glaucoma procedure (phaco-trabeculectomy) can be planned and performed.
- The pupil is checked for dilation using eyedrops; if they do not provide a satisfactory result, injected intracameral mydriatics have been shown to be safe and effective for surgery and fast acting. If pharmacologic pupil dilation is insufficient, procedures for mechanical pupil dilatation may be needed during the surgery.
- People with retinal detachment may be scheduled for a combined vitreo-retinal procedure, along with IOL implantation.
- People taking tamsulosin (Flomax), a common drug for enlarged prostate, are prone to developing a surgical complication known as intraoperative floppy iris syndrome (IFIS), which requires appropriate management to avoid posterior capsule rupture. (Note: Posterior capsule rupture: Unintended tearing of the posterior membrane of the lens capsule, which can allow migration of the vitreous into the anterior chamber.)
- A Cochrane Review of three randomized clinical trials, including over 21,500 cataract surgeries, examined whether routine pre-operative medical testing resulted in a reduction of adverse events during surgery. Results showed performing pre-operative medical testing did not result in a reduction of risk of intra-operative or post-operative medical adverse events, compared to surgeries with no or limited pre-operative testing.
- Infants with congenital cataracts are more likely to have post-operative inflammation problems, and their eyes grow rapidly and unpredictably, making it challenging to select and fit a posterior chamber IOL in infants younger than seven months that will give satisfactory results later in childhood. A second surgery may be required later.

=== Contraindications ===
Contraindications to cataract surgery include cataracts that do not cause visual impairment and medical conditions that predict a high risk of unsatisfactory surgical outcomes. such as:

- Poor general health or a serious medical condition.
- Surgery will not provide better visual function.
- Advanced macular degeneration
- Detached retina.
- Advanced diabetes that has affected the retina.
- An infection of the eyes or nearby that could cause endophthalmitis, so should be treated before cataract surgery.
- The person does not want surgery.
- Functional vision can be provided by glasses or other visual aids which is sufficient for the person's requirements.
- Corneal diseases such as glaucoma may be a relative contraindication.

=== Selection of intraocular lenses ===
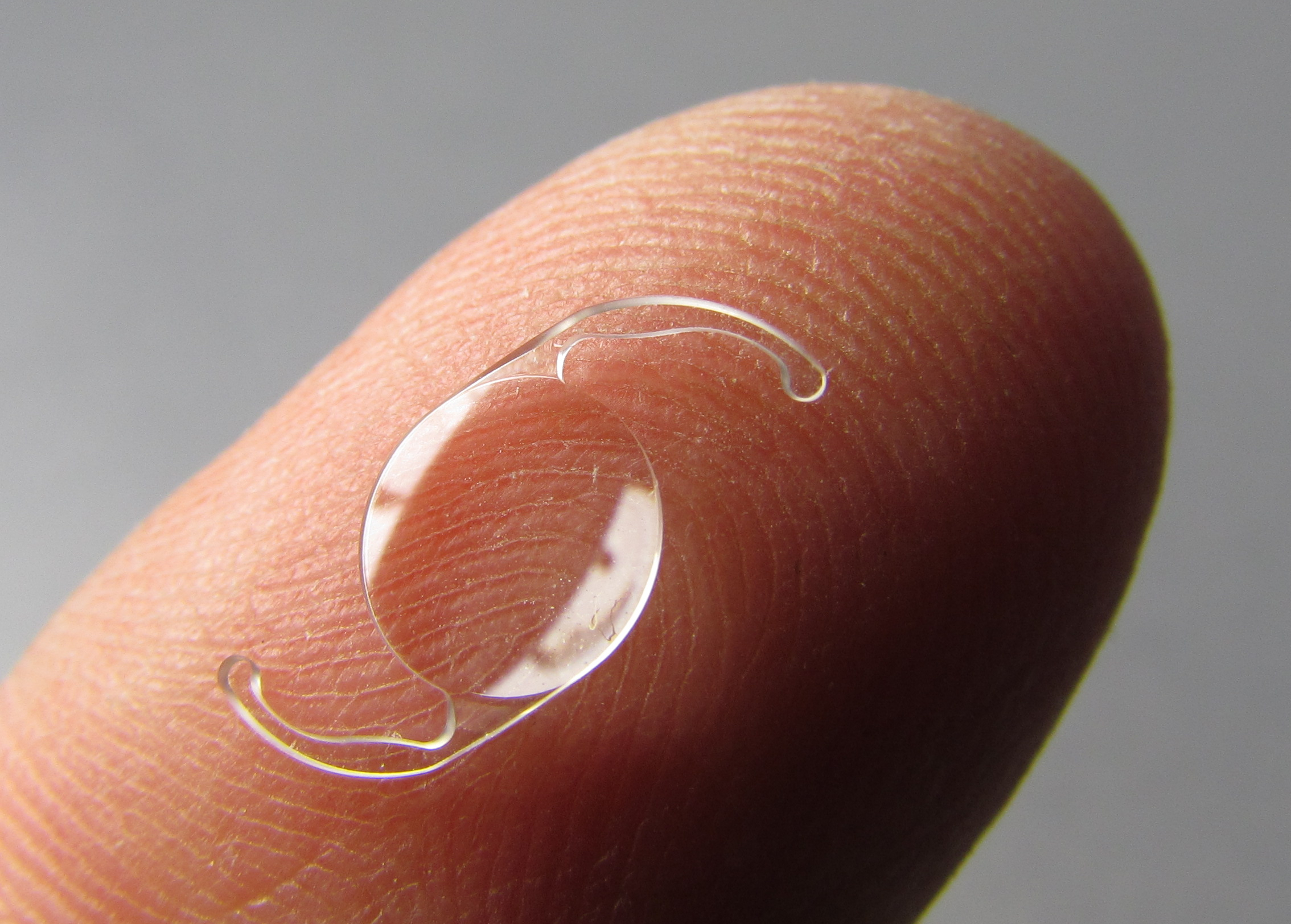
18.5 diopter foldable intraocular lens

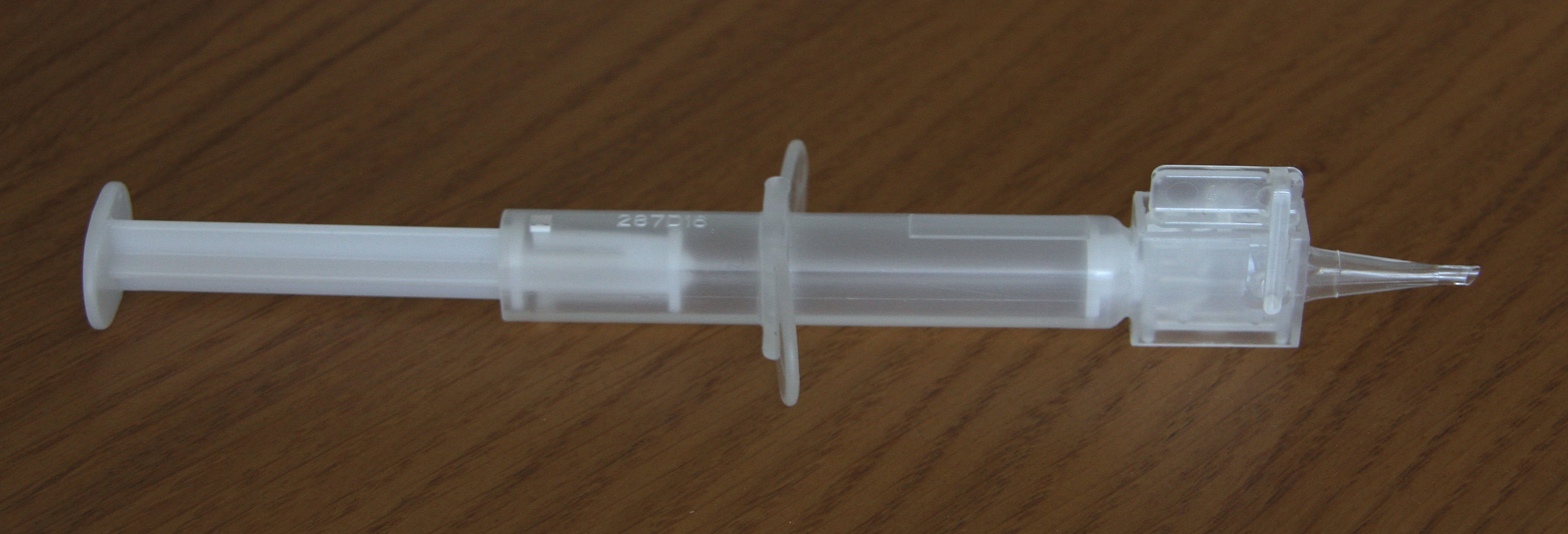
Injector for foldable intraocular lenses. The incision size for this type is 2.8 mm.

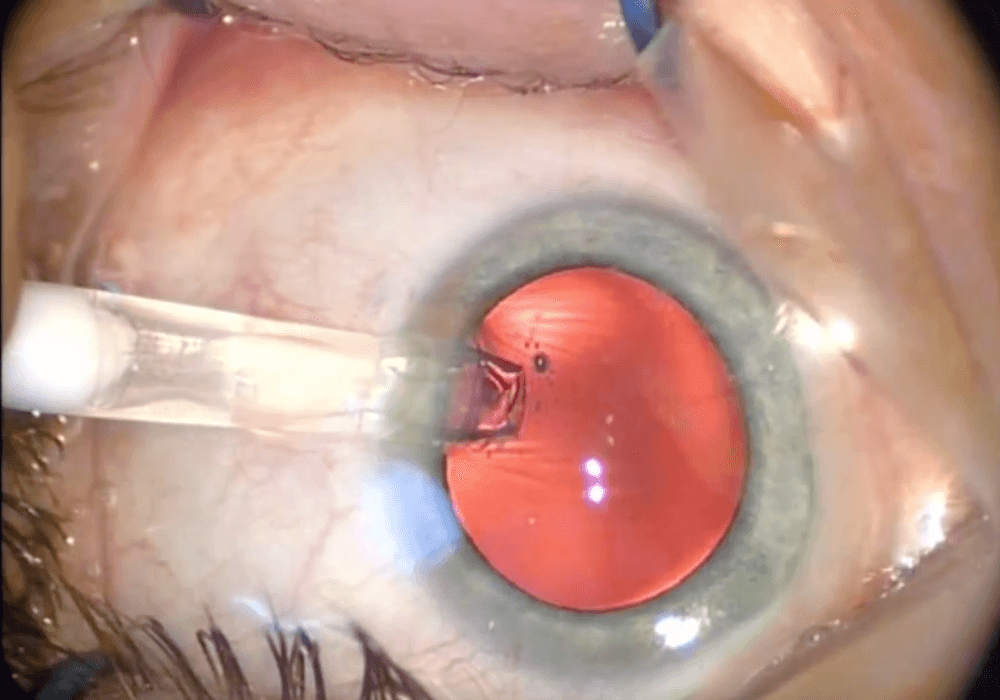
The IOL injector is inserted in the incision and aimed at the capsule.

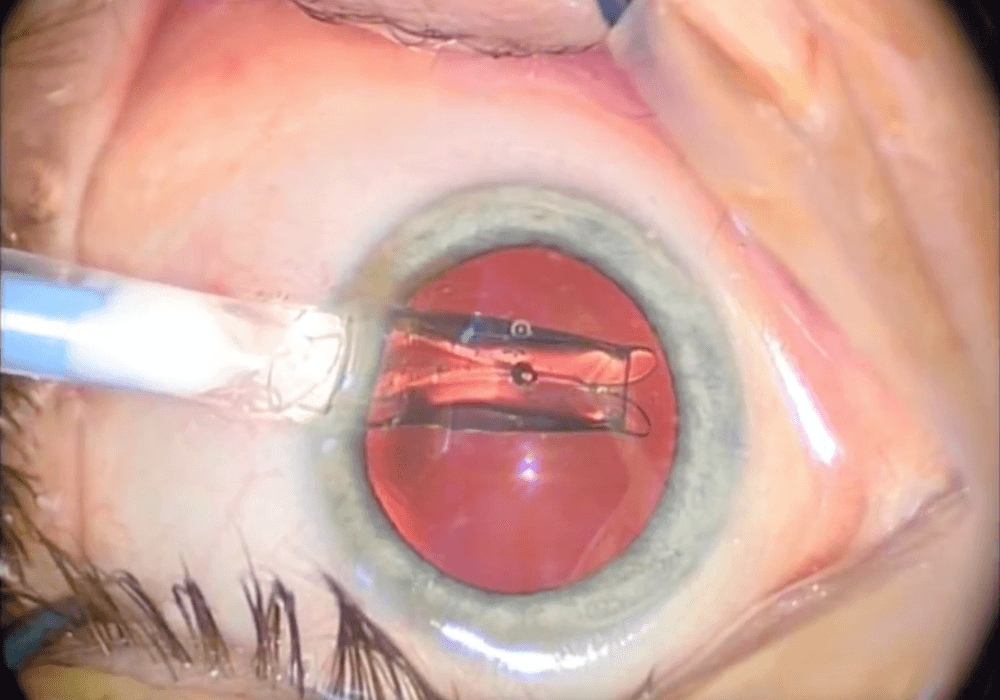
The rolled up lens is ejected from the nozzle into the capsule.

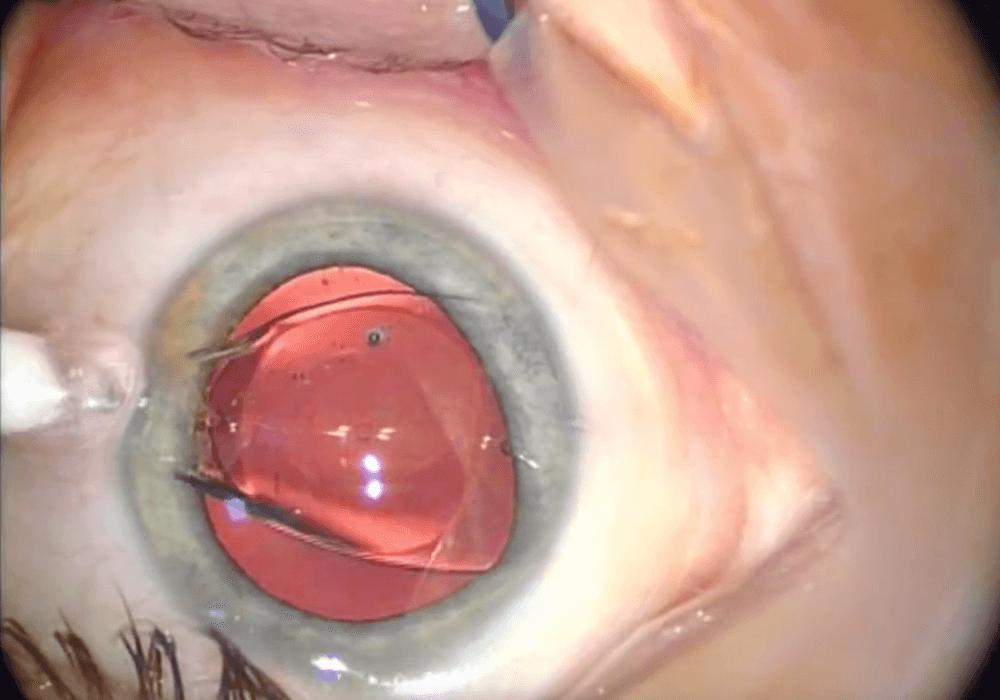
The lens unfolds in place.

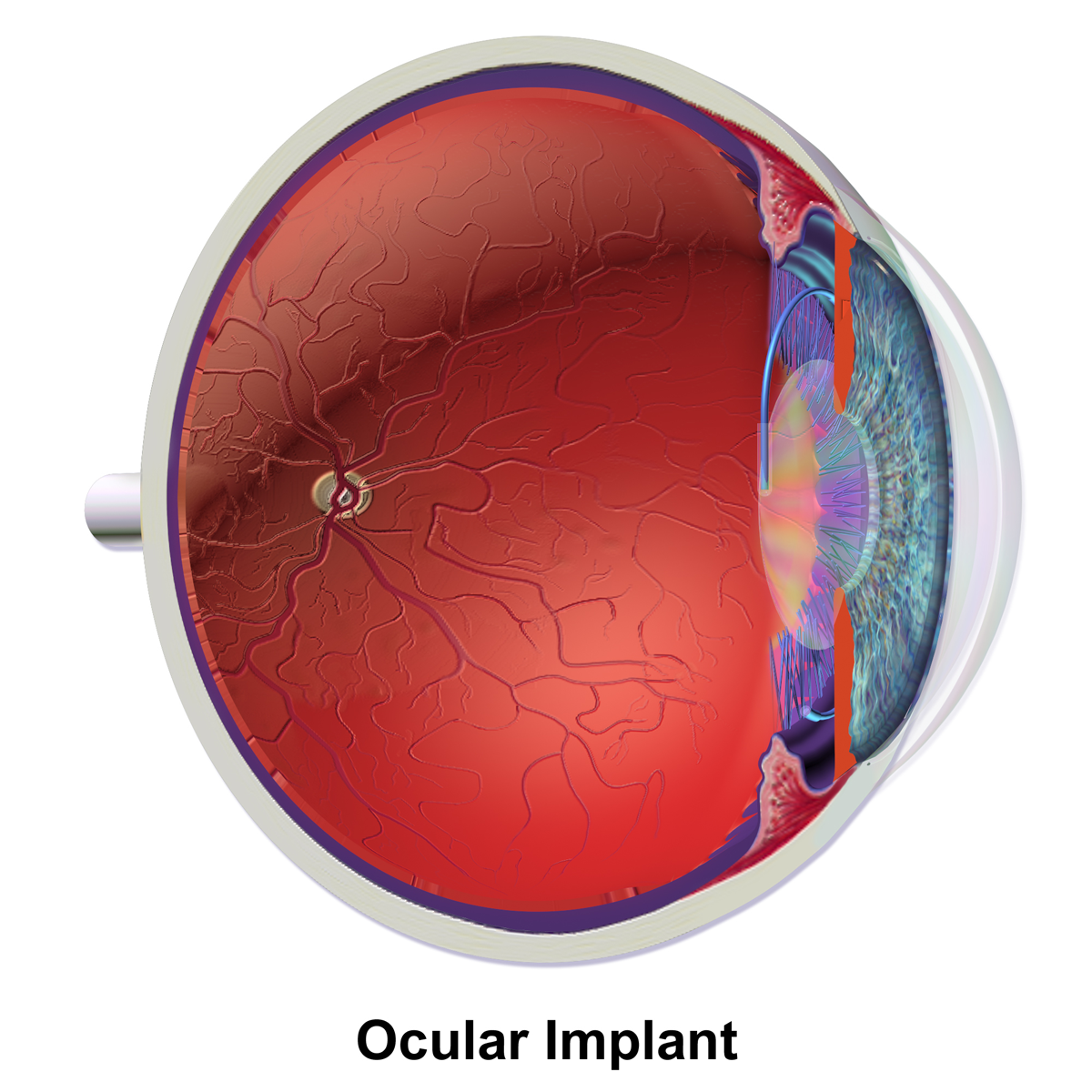
Section diagram of the eye, showing intraocular lens implanted in the posterior lens capsule behind the iris

After the removal of a cataract, an intraocular lens is usually implanted to replace the damaged natural lens. A foldable IOL may be implanted through a 1.8 to 2.8 mm (0.071 to 0.110 in) incision, whereas a rigid poly(methyl methacrylate) (PMMA) lens requires a larger cut. Foldable IOLs are made of silicone, hydrophobic, or hydrophilic acrylic material of appropriate refractive power and are inserted with a special tool. The IOL is inserted through the incision, usually into the capsular bag from which the cataract was removed (in-the-bag implantation). Sometimes, a sulcus implantation—in front of the capsular bag, but behind the iris—may be required because of posterior capsular tears or zonular dialysis (inadequate support for the capsular bag). This requires an IOL with different refractive power because of the placement further forward on the optical axis.

The appropriate refractive power of the IOL is selected, much like a spectacle or contact lens prescription, to provide the desired refractive outcome. Pre-operative measurements, including corneal curvature, axial length, and white-to-white measurements (Note: White -to-white (WTW) measurement of an eye is the horizontal diameter of the cornea, measured across the corneal limbus.) are used to estimate the required power of the IOL. These methods include several formulae and free online calculators which use similar input data. A history of corneal refractive laser surgery such as LASIK surgery, which alters corneal curvature, requires different calculations to take this into account.

Monofocal IOLs provide accurately focused vision at one distance only; far, intermediate, or near. People with monofocal IOLs implanted to obtain clear unaided distance vision may need to wear glasses or contact lenses while reading or using a computer. These lenses usually have uniform spherical curvature.

Other designs of multifocal intraocular lens that focus light from distant and near objects, working with similar effect to bifocal or trifocal eyeglasses, are also available. More recently, Extended Depth of Focus (EDOF) IOLs have been made available to surgeons and patients. EDOF IOLs aim to preserve good distance vision while providing functional reading vision. Pre-operative patient selection and good counselling is necessary to avoid unrealistic expectations and post-operative patient dissatisfaction, and possibly a requirement to replace the lens. Acceptability of these lenses has improved, and studies have shown good results in patients selected for expected compatibility.

Cataract surgery may be performed to correct vision problems on both eyes. If both eyes are suitable, people are usually advised to consider monovision. This procedure involves inserting an IOL providing near vision into one eye, while using one that provides distance vision for the other eye. Although most people can adjust to having monofocal IOLs with differing focal length, some cannot compensate and may experience blurred vision at both near and far distances. An IOL optimised for distance vision may be combined with an IOL that optimises intermediate vision, instead of near vision, as a variation of monovision.

One model of lens designed to change focus using the natural reflexes of the eye has two hinged struts on opposite edges, which displace the lens along the optical axis when an inward transverse force is applied to the haptic loops at the outer ends of the struts—the components transferring the movement of the contact points to the device—while recoiling when the same force is reduced. The lens is implanted in the eye's lens capsule, where the contractions of the ciliary body, which would focus the eye with the natural lens, are used to focus the implant, instead.

IOLs used in correcting astigmatism have different curvature on two orthogonal axes, as on the surface of a torus: for this reason, they are called toric lenses. Intraoperative aberrometry (Note: Intraoperative aberrometry: A tool to take aphakic and pseudophakic refractive measurements during surgery to help optimise IOL power selection and placement.) can be used to assist the surgeon in toric lens placement and minimize astigmatic errors.

The first aspheric IOLs were developed in 2004; they have a flatter periphery than the middle of the lens, improving contrast sensitivity. The effectiveness of aspheric IOLs depends on a range of conditions and they may not always provide significant benefit.

The development of light-adjustable intraocular lens (approved by the FDA in 2017), further expanded options for patients with cataracts.

Some IOLs are able to absorb ultraviolet and high-energy blue light, thus mimicking the functions of the natural crystalline lens of the eye, which usually filters potentially harmful frequencies. A 2018 Cochrane review found there is unlikely to be a significant difference in distance vision between blue-filtering and plain lenses, and was unable to identify a difference in contrast sensitivity or colour discrimination.

The light-adjustable IOL was approved by the U.S. Food and Drug Administration (FDA) in 2017. This type of IOL is implanted in the eye and then treated with ultraviolet light to alter the curvature of the lens before fixing it at the final strength.

In some cases, it may be necessary or desirable to insert an additional lens over the already implanted one, also in the posterior capsule. This type of IOL placement is called "piggyback" IOLs and is usually considered when the visual outcome of the first implant is not optimal. In such cases, implanting another IOL over the existing one is considered safer than replacing the initial lens. This approach may also be used in people who need high degrees of vision correction.

Cost is an important aspect of these lenses. Although Medicare covers the cost of monofocal IOLs in the United States, people will have to pay the price difference if they choose more expensive lenses.

== Operation procedures ==
=== Preparation ===
Preparation may begin three to seven days before surgery, with the pre-operative application of NSAIDs and antibiotic eyedrops. If the IOL is to be placed behind the iris, the pupil is dilated by using drops to help better visualise the cataract. Pupil-constricting drops are reserved for secondary implantation of the IOL in front of the iris, when the cataract has already been removed without primary IOL implantation.

The operation may occur on a stretcher or a reclining examination chair. The eyelids and surrounding skin are swabbed with a disinfectant, such as 10% povidone-iodine, and topical povidone-iodine is applied to the eye. The face is covered with a cloth or sheet with an opening for the operative eye. The eyelid is held open with a speculum to minimize blinking during surgery. Pain is usually minimal in properly anaesthetised eyes, though a pressure sensation and discomfort from the bright operating microscope light is common.

=== Anaesthesia ===
Most cataract operations are performed under local anaesthetic, allowing the patient to return home the same day. Lens and cataract procedures are commonly performed in an outpatient setting; in the United States, 99.9% of lens and cataract procedures were done in an outpatient setting by 2012.

Topical, sub-tenon, peribulbar, or retrobulbar local anaesthesia is generally used, usually causing little or no discomfort. Injections may be used to block regional nerves and prevent eye movement. Topical anaesthetics are most commonly used, placed on the globe of the eye as eyedrops (before surgery), or in the globe (during surgery). Oral or intravenous sedation to reduce anxiety may be combined with the local anaesthetic. General anaesthesia and retrobulbar blocks were historically used for intracapsular cataract surgery, and may be used for children and adults whose medical or psychiatric issues significantly affect their ability to remain still during the procedure.

=== Phacoemulsification ===
Phacoemulsification uses a machine with an ultrasonic handpiece with a titanium or surgical stainless steel tip, which vibrates at an ultrasonic frequency—commonly 40 kHz—to emulsify the lens tissue, which is aspirated by a coaxial annular suction tube. A second instrument, which is sometimes called a "cracker" or "chopper", may be used from a small side incision to break the hard cataract nucleus into smaller pieces, making emulsification and removal of the soft part of the lens around the nucleus easier. After phacoemulsification of the lens nucleus and cortical material is completed, an irrigation–aspiration (I-A) system is used to remove the remaining peripheral lens material. The procedure is done under a surgical microscope.

Femtosecond laser-assisted phacoemulsification surgery is a more recent development which may have fewer adverse effects on the cornea and macula than manual phacoemulsification. The laser is used to make the corneal incision and the capsulotomy, which provides access to the lens, and initiate lens fragmentation, which reduces energy requirements for phacoemulsification. It provides high-precision, effective lens fragmentation at lower power levels and consequent good optical quality. However, as of 2022, the technique has not been shown to have significant visual, refractive, or safety benefits over manual phacoemulsification, and it has a higher cost.

Entry into the eye is made through a minimal tunnel incision near the edge of the cornea. The incision for cataract surgery has evolved along with the techniques for cataract removal and IOL placement. In phacoemulsification, the width depends on the requirements for IOL insertion. With foldable IOLs, it is often possible to use incisions smaller than 3.5 mm (0.14 in). The shape, position, and size of the incision affect the capacity for self sealing, the tendency to induce astigmatism, and the surgeon's ability to maneuvre instruments through the opening. A more-posterior incision simplifies wound closure and decreases induced astigmatism, but it is more likely to damage blood vessels nearby. One or two smaller side-port incisions at 60-to-90 degrees from the main incision may be needed to access the anterior chamber with additional instruments.

Ophthalmic viscosurgical devices (OVDs), a class of clear, gel-like materials, are injected into the anterior chamber at the start of the procedure, to support, stabilize, and protect the eyeball, to help maintain eye shape and volume, and to distend the lens capsule during IOL implantation. Their consistency allows surgical instruments to move through them, although they do not flow and retain their shape under low shear stress. The OVD will also constrain lens fragments from drifting around in the chamber. OVDs are available in several formulations, which may be combined or used individually as best suits the procedure.

The lens is inside a capsule supported by the ciliary body, between the aqueous and vitreous, behind the opening in the iris. Capsulorhexis is the process of tearing a circular opening in the front membrane of the lens capsule to access the lens within. In phacoemulsification, an anterior continuous curvilinear capsulorhexis is usually used to create a round, smooth-edged opening through which the surgeon can emulsify the lens nucleus, and then implant the intraocular lens.

The cataract's outer (cortical) layer is then separated from the capsule by a gentle, continuous flow or pulsed dose of liquid from a cannula, which is injected under the anterior capsular flap, along the edge of the capsulorhexis opening, in a step called hydrodissection. In hydrodelineation, fluid is injected into the body of the lens through the cortex against the nucleus of the cataract, which separates the hardened nucleus from the softer cortex shell by flowing along the interface between them. As a result, the smaller hard nucleus can be more-easily emulsified. The posterior cortex serves as a buffer at this stage, protecting the posterior capsule membrane. The smaller size of the separated nucleus allows it to be broken up using shallower and less-peripheral grooving by the phaco tip, and produces smaller fragments after cracking or chopping. The posterior cortex also maintains the shape of the capsule through this stage, which reduces the risk of posterior capsule rupture.

After nuclear cracking or chopping (if needed), the cataract is reduced to small fragments using ultrasound which are simultaneously aspirated. The remaining lens cortex (outer layer of lens) material from the capsular bag is carefully aspirated, and if necessary, the remaining epithelial cells from the capsule are removed by capsular polishing. The folded intraocular replacement lens is implanted, usually into the remaining posterior capsule, and checked to see that it has unfolded and seated correctly. A toric IOL must also be aligned in the correct axis to counteract astigmatism.

=== Manual small incision cataract surgery (MSICS) ===
Many of the steps followed during MSICS are similar, if not identical, to those for phacoemulsification; the main differences are related to the alternative method of incision and cataract extraction from the capsule and eye.

Manual small incision cataract surgery (MSICS) is an evolution of extracapsular cataract extraction (ECCE); the lens is removed from the eye through a self-sealing tunnel wound through the sclera. A well-constructed scleral tunnel is held closed by internal pressure, is watertight, and does not require suturing. The wound is relatively smaller than the one in ECCE, but is still markedly larger than a phaco wound.

The small incision into the anterior chamber of the eye is made at or near the corneal limbus, where the cornea and sclera meet, either superior or temporal. Advantages of the smaller incision include use of few-to-no stitches and shortened recovery time. The MSICS incision is small in comparison with the earlier ECCE incision, but considerably larger than the one used in phacoemulsification. The precise geometry of the incision is important, as it affects the self-sealing of the wound and the amount of astigmatism induced by distortion of the cornea during healing. A sclerocorneal or scleral tunnel incision is commonly used, since it reduces the risk of induced astigmatism if suitably formed. A sclerocorneal tunnel, a three-phase incision, starts with a shallow incision perpendicular to the sclera, followed by an incision through the sclera and cornea approximately parallel to the outer surface, and then a beveled incision into the anterior chamber. This structure provides the self-sealing characteristic, because internal pressure presses together the faces of the incision. Bridle sutures (Note: Bridle suture: A suture passing through the superior rectus muscle of the eye, used to rotate the eyeball downwards in eye surgery.) may be used to help stabilize the eyeball during sclerocorneal tunnel incision, and during extraction of the nucleus and epinucleus through the tunnel. The depth of the anterior chamber and position of the posterior capsule may be maintained during surgery by OVDs or an anterior chamber maintainer, which is an auxiliary cannula providing a sufficient flow of buffered saline solution (BSS) to maintain stability of the shape of the chamber and internal pressure. An anterior capsulotomy, is then done to open the front surface of the lens capsule for access to the lens. The continuous curvilinear capsulorhexis technique is often used, or can-opener capsulotomy or envelope capsulotomy. The lens may be divided into two or more pieces of similar size using a constricting loop, blades or other devices. The cataract lens or fragments are then removed from the capsule and anterior chamber using hydroexpression, (Note: Hydroexpression: Method of removing the lens from the capsule and anterior chamber by carrying it out in a flow of saline solution.) viscoexpression, (Note: Viscoexpression: Method of removing the lens from the capsule and anterior chamber by carrying it out in a flow of viscoelastic material.) or more direct mechanical methods. Following cataract removal, an IOL is usually inserted into the posterior capsule. When the posterior membrane of the capsule is damaged, the IOL may be inserted into the ciliary sulcus, or a glued intraocular lens technique may be applied.

=== Extracapsular cataract extraction ===
Extracapsular cataract extraction (ECCE), also known as manual extracapsular cataract extraction, is the removal of almost the entire natural lens in one piece, while most of the elastic lens capsule (posterior capsule) is left intact to allow implantation of an intraocular lens. The lens is manually removed through a 10–12 mm (0.39–0.47 in) incision in the cornea or sclera. Although it requires a larger incision and the use of stitches, this method may be preferable for very hard cataracts, which would require a relatively large ultrasonic energy input, which causes more heating, as well as in other situations in which phacoemulsification is problematic.

=== Converting to ECCE to manage a contingency ===
The most commonly used procedures are phacoemulsification and manual small incision cataract surgery (MSICS). In either of these procedures, it can sometimes be necessary to convert to ECCE to deal with a problem better managed through a larger incision. This may occur in the event of posterior capsule rupture, zonular dehiscence, (Note: Zonular dehiscence: Breaking of the fibrous strands (zonules) connecting the crystalline lens to the ciliary body.) a dropped nucleus (Note: Dropped nucleus: A cataract nucleus which has fallen through into the vitreous chamber.) with a nuclear fragment more than half the size of the cataract, problematic capsulorhexis with a hard cataract, or a very dense cataract where the heat developed by phacoemulsification is likely to cause permanent damage to the cornea. Similarly, a change from MSICS to ECCE is appropriate whenever the nucleus is too large for the MSICS incision, as well as in cases where the nucleus is found to be deformed during MSICS on a nanophthalmic eye. (Note: Nanophthalmic: Exceptionally small eyes.)

=== Closing the wound ===
After the IOL is inserted, OVDs that were injected to stabilize the anterior chamber, protecting the cornea from damage and distending the cataract's capsule during IOL implantation, are removed from the eye to prevent post-operative viscoelastic glaucoma, a severe intra-ocular pressure increase. This is done via suction from the irrigation-aspiration instrument and replacement by buffered saline solution (BSS). Cohesive OVDs tend to adhere to themselves, a characteristic that makes their removal easier. Removal of OVDs from behind the implant reduces the risk and magnitude of post-operative pressure spikes or capsular distention. In the final step, the wound is sealed by increasing the pressure inside the globe with BSS, which presses the internal tissue against the external tissue of the incision, holding it closed. The surgeon will check whether the incision leaks fluid, because wound leakage increases the risk of penetration into the eye by microorganisms, thus predisposing it to endophthalmitis. If this does not achieve a satisfactory seal, a suture may be added. The wound is then hydrated, an antibiotic/steroid combination eyedrop is put in, and an eye-shield may be applied, sometimes supplemented with an eyepatch.

== Post-operative care ==
The use of an eye patch may be indicated, usually for some hours after surgery and for a few days while sleeping. A topical corticosteroid or nonsteroidal anti-inflammatory drug (NSAID) is used to control inflammation, in combination with topical antibiotics to prevent infection in the post-operative phase. These are generally self-administered as eyedrops for a few weeks.

== Complications ==
=== During surgery ===
Posterior capsular rupture, a tear in the posterior membrane of the natural lens capsule, is the most common complication during cataract surgery, with its rate ranging from 0.5% to 5.2%. In most cases the situation can be salvaged, though it may be necessary to modify the original plans for the placement, refractive strength, and type of IOL. Fragments of the nucleus can find their way through the tear into the vitreous chamber, and recovery of the fragments is not always desirable and is rarely successful. The rest of the fragments should generally be stabilised first, and vitreous should be prevented from entering the anterior chamber, and removed if it does. Removal of the fragments may be best referred to a vitreoretinal specialist. Surgical management of a rupture may involve the Intraocular lens scaffold procedure, anterior vitrectomy, and occasionally, alternative planning for implanting the IOL, either in the ciliary sulcus (the space between the iris and the ciliary body), in the anterior chamber in front of the iris, or less commonly, sutured to the sclera. Posterior capsule rupture can cause corneal oedema, cystoid macular oedema, and retention of lens fragments; it is also associated with a six-times increase in the risk of endophthalmitis and as much as a nineteen-times increase in the risk of retinal detachment. Risk factors for posterior capsule rupture include older age, male gender, glaucoma, diabetic retinopathy, white cataract, posterior polar cataract, inability to visualize the posterior segment preoperatively, pseudoexfoliation (exfoliation syndrome), small pupils, axial length greater than 26 mm, use of systemic alpha-1a antagonist medication (e.g., tamsulosin), previous trauma, inability of the patient to lie flat, history of intravitreal injections, patient movement, and resident-performed cataract surgery.

Suprachoroidal hemorrhage is a rare complication of intraocular surgery, which occurs when damaged ciliary arteries bleed into the space between the choroid and the sclera. It is a potentially vision-threatening pathology and must be treated immediately to preserve visual functions. Risk factors for suprachoroidal hemorrhage include anterior chamber intraocular lens (ACIOL), axial myopia, advanced age, atherosclerosis, glaucoma, systolic hypertension, tachycardia, uveitis and previous ocular surgery.

Intraoperative floppy iris syndrome has an incidence ranging from around 0.5% to 2.0%. Iris or ciliary body injury has an incidence of about 0.6–1.2%. Other complications include failure to aspirate all lens fragments, leaving some in the anterior chamber, and incisional burns, caused by overheating of the phacoemulsification tip when ultrasonic power continues while the irrigation or aspiration lines are blocked—the flow through these lines is used to keep the tip cool. Burns to the incision may make closure difficult and can cause corneal astigmatism.

=== After surgery ===
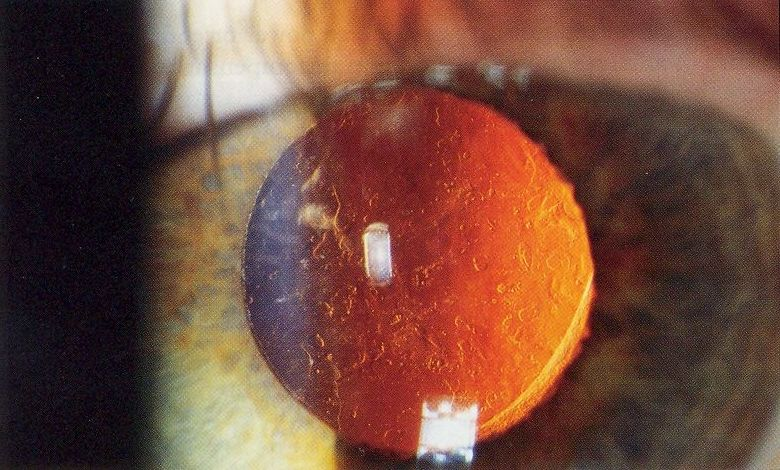
Slit lamp photo of IOL showing Posterior capsular opacification (PCO) visible a few months after implantation of intraocular lens in eye, seen on retroillumination

Complications after cataract surgery are relatively uncommon. Posterior vitreous detachment (PVD) does not directly threaten vision, but may increase the risk of future vitreoretinal conditions. It may be more problematic in younger eyes because many people older than 60 have already gone through PVD. PVD may be accompanied by peripheral light flashes and increasing numbers of floaters.

Some people develop posterior capsular opacification (PCO), also called an "after-cataract". After cataract surgery, posterior capsular cells usually undergo hyperplasia and cellular migration as part of a physiological change, showing up as a thickening, opacification, and clouding of the posterior lens capsule, which is left behind after the cataract is removed, for placement of the IOL. This may compromise visual acuity, and can usually be safely and painlessly corrected by using a Nd:YAG laser to clear the central portion of the opacified posterior pole of the capsule (posterior capsulotomy). This creates a clear central visual axis, which improves visual acuity. In very thick opacified posterior capsules, a manual surgical capsulectomy might be needed. In the event of IOL replacement, a posterior capsulotomy could allow vitreous to migrate into the anterior chamber through the opening previously occluded by the IOL, and this would have to be removed. Posterior capsule opacification reaches an incidence of about 28.4% by five years, and is influenced by many factors, including age, IOL lens material, lens design, quantity of residual lens cortex, history of ocular inflammation, and size of capsulorhexis.

Retinal detachment normally occurs at a prevalence of 1 in 1,000 (0.1%); however, people who have had cataract surgery are at an increased risk (0.5–0.6%) of developing rhegmatogenous retinal detachment (RRD)—the most common form of the condition. Cataract surgery increases the rate of vitreous humour liquefaction, which leads to increased rates of RRD. When a retinal tear occurs, vitreous liquid enters the space between the retina and retinal pigment epithelium (RPE), and presents as flashes of light (photopsia), dark floaters, and loss of peripheral vision. Toxic anterior segment syndrome (TASS), a non-infectious inflammatory condition, may also occur following cataract surgery: it is usually treated with topical corticosteroids in high dosage and frequency.

Endophthalmitis is a serious infection of intraocular tissues, usually following intraocular surgery complications or penetrating trauma, and one of the most severe. It rarely occurs as a complication of cataract surgery, due to the use of prophylactic antibiotics, but there is some concern that the clear cornea incision might predispose to the increase of endophthalmitis, although no conclusive study has corroborated this suspicion. An intracameral injection of antibiotics may be used as a preventive measure. A meta-analysis showed the incidence of endophthalmitis after phacoemulsification to be 0.092%. The risk gets higher in association with factors such as diabetes, advanced age, larger incision procedures, and vitreous communication with the anterior chamber caused by posterior capsule rupture. The risk of vitreous infection is at least six times higher than for the aqueous. Endophthalmitis typically presents within two weeks after the procedure, with manifestations such as decreased visual acuity, red-eye and pain. Hypopyon occurs about 80% of the time. About 80% of infections are caused by coagulase-negative staphylococci and Staphylococcus aureus. Management includes vitreous humour tap and injection of broad-spectrum antibiotics. Outcomes can be severe even with treatment, and may range from permanently decreased visual acuity to the complete loss of light perception, depending on the microbiological etiology.

Glaucoma may occur and may be very difficult to control. It is usually associated with inflammation, especially when fragments of the nucleus enter the vitreous cavity. Some experts recommend early intervention by posterior pars plana vitrectomy when this condition occurs. In most cases, raised post-operative intraocular pressure is transient and benign, usually returning to baseline within 24 hours without intervention. Glaucoma patients may experience further visual field loss or a loss of fixation, and are more likely to experience intraocular pressure spikes. On the other hand, secondary glaucoma is an important complication of surgery for congenital cataracts: patients can develop this condition even several years after undergoing cataract surgery, so they need lifelong surveillance.

Mechanical pupillary block manifests when the anterior chamber gets shallower as a result of the obstruction of the aqueous humour flow through the pupil by the vitreous face or IOL. This is caused by contact between the edge of the pupil and an adjacent structure, which blocks the flow of aqueous through the pupil itself. The iris then bulges forward and closes the angle between the iris and cornea, blocking drainage through the trabecular meshwork and causing an increase in intraocular pressure. Mechanical pupillary block has mainly been identified as a complication of anterior chamber intraocular lens implantation, but has been known to occur occasionally after posterior IOL implantation.

Occasionally, a peripheral iridectomy may be made to minimize the risk of pupillary block glaucoma. Surgical iridectomy can be done manually or with a Nd:YAG laser. Laser peripheral iridotomy may be done either before or following cataract surgery.

Swelling of the macula, the central part of the retina, results in macular oedema and can occur a few days or weeks after surgery. Most such cases can be successfully treated. Preventative use of nonsteroidal anti-inflammatory drugs has been reported to reduce the risk of macular oedema to some extent.

Uveitis–glaucoma–hyphema syndrome is a complication caused by the mechanical irritation of a mis-positioned IOL over the iris, ciliary body or iridocorneal angle.

Other possible complications include elevated intraocular pressure; swelling or oedema of the cornea, which is sometimes associated with transient or permanent cloudy vision (pseudophakic bullous keratopathy); displacement or dislocation of the IOL implant; unplanned high refractive error—either myopic or hypermetropic—due to errors in the ultrasonic biometry (measurement of the eye length and calculation of the required intraocular lens power); cyanopsia, which often occurs for a few days, weeks or months after removal of a cataract; vitreous bulge or vitreous touch syndrome, and floaters, which commonly appear after surgery.

It may be necessary to exchange, (Note: Exchange: The IOL is replaced with another of the same model.) remove (Note: Remove: The IOL is removed and replaced with a different model lens or no replacement lens is implanted.) or reposition (Note: Reposition: The IOL is surgically moved to another location or rotated.) an IOL after surgery, for any of the following reasons:

- Capsular block syndrome, the hyper-distention of the lens capsular bag, due to the IOL blocking fluid from draining through the anterior capsulotomy. This may cause a myopic refractive error;
- Chronic anterior uveitis, which is a persistent inflammation of the anterior segment;
- Chronic loss of endothelial cells faster than the rate due to normal aging;
- Iris pigment epithelium loss;
- Physical pain;
- Progressive elongation of the pupil in direction of the IOL's long axis;
- Progressive closing of the anterior chamber angle, due to propagation of anterior synechiae without apparent anterior uveitis;
- Incorrect IOL refractive power;
- Incorrect positioning of the IOL (including decentring, tilt, or rotation), which partially prevents its correct function;
- Damage or deformation of the IOL;
- Unexpected optical results due to defects of the IOL;
- Undesirable optical phenomena reported by the patient due to any other cause.

=== Risk ===
Cataract surgery and IOL implantation have the safest and highest success rates of any eye care-related procedures. As with any type of surgery, however, some level of risk remains.

Most complications of cataract surgery do not result in long-term visual impairment, but some severe complications can lead to irreversible blindness. A survey of adverse results affecting Medicare patients recorded between 2004 and 2006 showed an average rate of 0.5% for one or more severe post-operative complications, with the rate decreasing by about 20% over the study period. The most important risk factors identified were diabetic retinopathy and a combination of cataract surgery with another intraocular procedure on the same day. In the study, 97% of the surgeries were not combined with other intraocular procedures; the remaining 3% were combined with retinal, corneal or glaucoma surgery on the same day.

== Recovery and rehabilitation ==
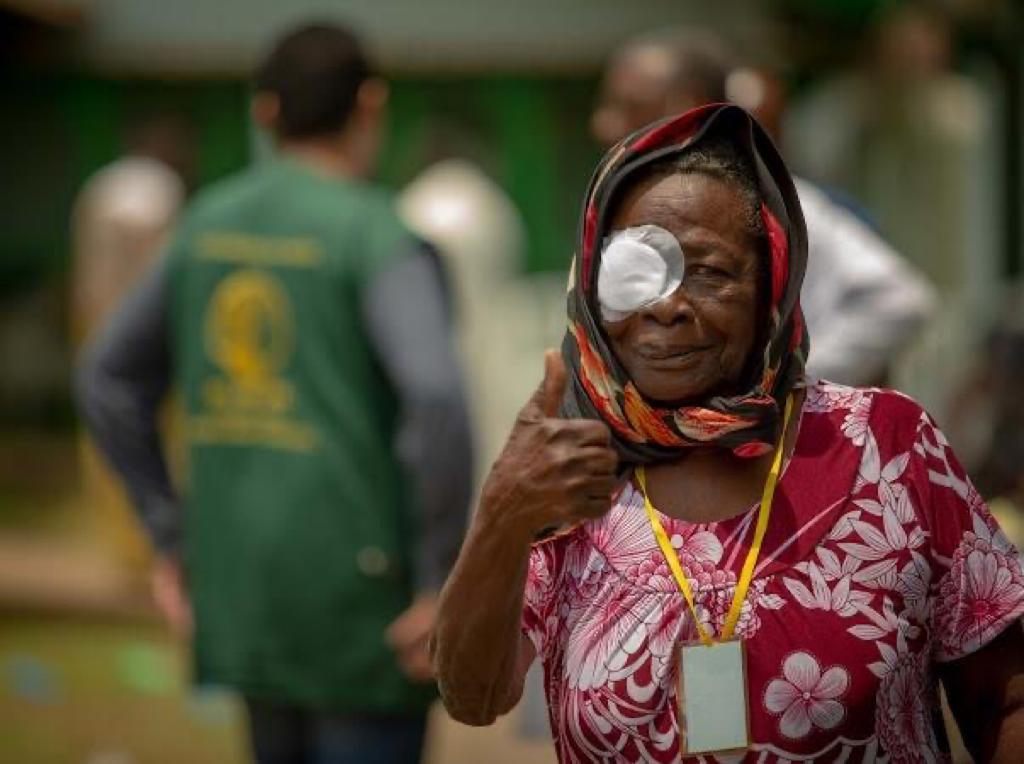
A shield or patch may be needed for a few days, mainly to protect from physical impact and contamination.

Following cataract surgery, side-effects such as grittiness, watering, blurred vision, double vision, and a red or bloodshot eye may occur, although they usually clear after a few days. Full recovery from the operation can take four-to-six weeks. Patients are usually advised to avoid getting water in the eye during the first week after surgery, and to avoid swimming for two-to-three weeks as a conservative approach, to minimise risk of bacterial infection. Most people can return to normal activities the day after phacoemulsification surgery. Depending on the procedure, they should avoid driving for at least 24 hours after the surgery, largely due to effects from the anaesthesia, possible swelling affecting focus, and pupil dilation causing excessive glare. At the first post-operative check, the surgeon will usually assess whether the patient's vision is suitable for driving.

With small-incision self-sealing wounds used with phacoemulsification, some of the post-operative restrictions common with intracapsular and extracapsular procedures are not relevant. Restrictions against lifting and bending were intended to reduce the risk of the wound opening, because straining increases intraocular pressure. With a self-sealing tunnel incision, however, higher pressure closes the wound more tightly. Routine use of a shield is not usually required, because inadvertent finger pressure on the eye should not open a correctly structured incision, which should only open to point pressure. After surgery, patients need to prevent contamination by avoiding rubbing their eyes, as well as not using eye makeup, face cream or lotions. Any kind of contact with excessive dust, wind, pollen or dirt should also be avoided. Moreover, people are advised to wear sunglasses on bright days, since the eyes become more sensitive to bright light for a prolonged period after surgery.

Topical anti-inflammatory drugs and antibiotics are commonly used in the form of eyedrops to reduce the risk of inflammation and infection. A shield or eye-patch may be prescribed to protect the eye while sleeping. The eye will be checked to ensure the IOL remains in place, and once it has fully stabilized (after about six weeks), vision tests will be used to check whether prescription lenses are needed. In cases where the focal length of the IOL is optimised for distance vision, reading glasses are generally needed for near focus.

In some cases, people are dissatisfied with the optical correction provided by the initial implants, making removal and replacement necessary; this can occur with more complex IOL designs, as the patient's expectations might not match with the compromises inherent in these designs, or they might not be able to accommodate the difference in distance and near-focusing of monovision lenses. The patient should not participate in contact or extreme sports, or similar activities, until cleared to do so by the eye surgeon.

== Outcomes ==
After full recovery, visual acuity depends on the underlying condition of the eye, the choice of IOL, and any long-term complications associated with the surgery. More than 90% of operations are successful in restoring useful vision, with a low complication rate. The World Health Organization (WHO) recommends at least 80% of eyes should have a presenting visual acuity of 6/6 to 6/18 (20/20 to 20/60) after surgery, which is considered a good enough visual outcome; the percentage is expected to reach at least 90% with best correction. Acuity of between 6/18 and 6/60 (20/60 to 20/200) is regarded as borderline, whereas a value worse than 6/60 (20/200) is considered poor. Borderline or poor visual outcomes are usually influenced by pre-surgery conditions such as glaucoma, macular disease, and diabetic retinopathy.

Refractive results using power calculation formulae based on pre-operative biometrics leave people within 0.5 dioptres of target (correlates to visual acuity of 6/7.5 (20/25) when targeted for distance) in 55% of cases and within one dioptre (correlates to 6/12 (20/40) when targeted for distance) in 85% of cases. Developments in intra-operative wavefront technology have demonstrated power calculations that provide improved outcomes, yielding 80% of patients within 0.5 dioptres (6/7.5 (20/25) or better).

A ten-year prospective survey on refractive outcomes from a UK National Health Service (NHS) cataract surgery service from 2006 to 2016 showed a mean absolute error between the targeted and outcome refraction of 0.50 dioptres, with a standard deviation of 0.67 dioptres. 88.76% were within one diopter of target refraction and 62.36% within 0.50 dioptres.

According to a 2009 study conducted in Sweden, factors that affected predicted refraction error included sex, pre-operative visual acuity and glaucoma, together with other eye conditions. Second-eye surgery, macular degeneration, age and diabetes did not affect the predicted outcome. Prediction error decreased with time, which is likely due to the use of improved equipment and techniques, including more-accurate biometry. A 2013 American survey involving nearly two million bilateral cataract surgery patients found immediate sequential bilateral cataract surgery was statistically associated with worse visual outcomes than for delayed sequential bilateral cataract surgery; however, the difference was small and might not be clinically relevant.

There is a tendency for post-operative refraction to vary slightly over several years. A small overall myopic shift has been recorded in 33.6% and a small hypermetropic shift in 45.2% of eyes with the remaining 21.2% in the study having no reported change. Most of the change occurred during the first year after surgery.

Phacoemulsification via a coaxial incision (Note: Coaxial phacoemulsification uses a single probe to irrigate, emulsify and aspirate, which is operated through a single incision.) may be associated with less astigmatism than the average for bimanual incisions, (Note: Bimanual phacoemulsification uses one probe to emulsify and aspirate, and a second that is only used for irrigation.) but the difference was found to be small and the evidence statistically uncertain.

== History ==
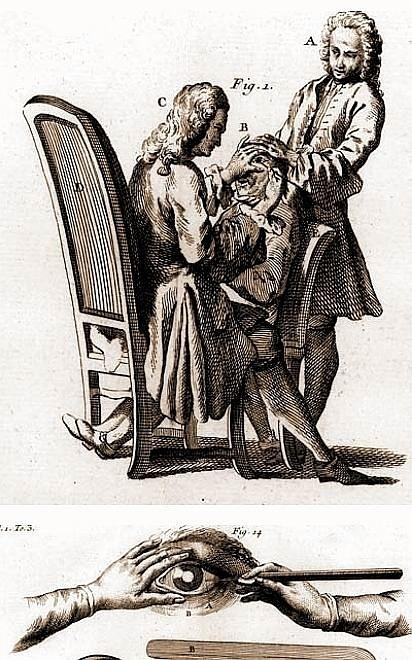
A cataract surgery. Dictionnaire Universel de Médecine (1746–1748)

Cataract surgery has a long history in Europe, Asia, and Africa, with Chrysippus of Soli, a stoic Greek philosopher providing the earliest account. Couching was the original form of cataract surgery, and was used from antiquity. It is still occasionally found in traditional medicine in parts of Africa and Asia. According to a paper published in the peer-reviewed journal Annals of Translational Medicine, much of the material in ophthalmology literature attributing cataract surgery to Sushruta is copied from earlier papers without verification from the original sources. According to ophthalmic historian Julius Hirschberg, whether the cataract operation was actually invented by the Indians can so far neither be confirmed nor denied.

Couching was the main procedure for cataracts from antiquity until Sep. 18, 1750 when French surgeon Jacques Daviel, credited as the father of modern cataract extraction surgery, performed a planned extracapsular cataract extraction while in Cologne. Daviel began animal experiments with cataract extraction in the first week of July 1750, following two other Paris-based surgeons (Jean Baseilhac and Natale Pallucci) who also began work on cataract extraction that same week. Daviel announced his performance of cataract extraction in the Gazette de Cologne of Sep. 22, 1750.

In 1753, Samuel Sharp performed the first-recorded surgical removal of the entire lens and lens capsule, equivalent to intracapsular cataract extraction. The lens was removed from the eye through a limbal incision.

In 1884, Karl Koller became the first surgeon to apply a cocaine solution to the cornea as a local anaesthetic. By the beginning of the 20th century, the standard surgical procedure was intracapsular cataract extraction (ICCE). In 1949, Harold Ridley introduced the concept of implantation of the intraocular lens (IOL) after treating a Spitfire pilot who had fragments of acrylic plastic in his eye and realising that, unlike most other foreign material, the eye did not reject acrylic. This made visual rehabilitation after cataract surgery a more efficient, effective, and comfortable process. Intracapsular cryoextraction was the favoured form of cataract extraction from the late 1960s to the early 1980s using a liquid-nitrogen-cooled probe tip to freeze the encapsulated lens to the probe. In 1967, Charles Kelman and Anton Banko introduced phacoemulsification, which uses ultrasonic energy to emulsify the nucleus of the crystalline lens and remove cataracts by aspiration without a large incision. This method of surgery reduced the need for an extended hospital stay and made out-patient surgery the standard. Ophthalmic viscosurgical devices (OVDs), which were introduced in 1972, facilitate the procedure and improve overall safety, particularly of phacoemulsification, by maintaining the shape of the eye at reduced pressure, and protecting the internal tissues of the eye without interfering with the operation.

In the early 1980s, Danièle Aron-Rosa and colleagues introduced the neodymium-doped yttrium aluminum garnet laser (Nd:YAG laser) for posterior capsulotomy. In 1985, Thomas Mazzocco developed and implanted the first foldable IOL, and Graham Barrett and associates pioneered the use of silicone, acrylic, and hydrogel foldable lenses. In 1987, M. Blumenthal and J. Moisseiev described the use of a reduced incision size for ECCE. They used a 6.5 to 7 mm (0.26 to 0.28 in) straight scleral tunnel incision 2 mm (0.079 in) behind the limbus with two side ports, and an anterior chamber maintainer. In 1989, M. McFarland introduced a self-sealing incision architecture, and in 1990, S.L.Pallin described a chevron-shaped incision that minimized the risk of induced astigmatism.

In 1983 G.T. Keener Jr. introduced a constricting wire loop, L.L. Fry reported the phaco-sandwich technique, and Peter Kansas suggested the phacosection method for reducing the incision required. The sclerocorneal pocket tunnel incision introduced by Kratz allowed manual small incision cataract surgery without phacoemulsification. The introduction of the anterior chamber maintainer (ACM) by Blumenthal in 1987 facilitated a high-pressure and -flow system, for a stable intraocular environment during surgery.

Vision 2020: The Right to Sight, a global initiative of the International Agency for the Prevention of Blindness (IAPB), was intended to reduce or eliminate the main causes of avoidable blindness worldwide by 2020. Programs instituted under Vision 2020 facilitated the planning, development, and implementation of sustainable national eye-care programs, including technical support and advocacy. The IAPB and WHO launched the program on 18 February 1999.

The Vision 2020 initiative succeeded in bringing avoidable blindness to the global health agenda. The causes have not been eliminated, but there have been significant changes to their distribution, which have been attributed to global demographic shifts. Remaining challenges to management of avoidable blindness include population size, gender disparities in access to eye-care, and the availability of a professional workforce.

Recent developments as of 2022 include continuing research into the possibility of lens regeneration and pharmacological approaches to slowing the development of cataracts. Lens implants that help compensate for age-related macular degeneration by magnification have been developed, but require relatively large incisions. Improved management of inflammatory response, use of ray-tracing models, artificial intelligence and a range of new formulae for refraction prediction.

== Accessibility ==
Access to cataract surgery is very variable by country and region. Even in developed countries availability may vary significantly between rural and more densely populated areas.

The global health situation of cataracts is improving but this progress has not reduced the need for cataract surgery, which is still inadequate in large parts of the world. Older people, women, and lower socioeconomic status are associated with higher untreated cataract numbers.

Cataracts have the most uneven global distribution of non-communicable eye diseases, with the burden of cataracts more concentrated in countries with lower socioeconomic status. Blindness is also correlated with a lack of ophthalmologists, and density of ophthalmologists correlates with a higher national income. High-income countries had an average of 76.2 ophthalmologists, and low income countries an average of 3.7 ophthalmologists per million inhabitants. The countries with highest socioeconomic levels tend to have the best cataract surgery outcomes. Low income countries also tend to lack adequate training facilities for surgeons.

=== Europe ===
About 4.5 million cataract surgeries were done in the EU Member States in 2016. The rate of surgeries generally varied between 12000 and 4000 per million inhabitants. The highest rate was in Portugal, at 14000 per million and the lowest were Ireland and Slovakia at 2000 per million. The figures are not altogether comparable, as in some countries only surgeries at hospitals are included in the counts. The proportion of out-patient surgeries increased in almost all EU states between 2011 and 2016.

=== Asia ===
The estimated distribution of ophthalmologists in Asia ranges from more than 114 per million of population in Japan, to none in Micronesia. South Asia has the highest global age-standardized prevalence of moderate-to-severe visual impairment (17.5%) and mild visual impairment (12.2%). Cataract has traditionally been a major cause of blindness in less-developed countries in the region, and in spite of improvements to the volume and quality of cataract surgeries, the rate of surgery remains low for some of these nations.

Cataracts are common in China; as of 2022, their estimated overall prevalence in Chinese people over 50 years old was 27.45%. The overall cataract-surgery coverage rate was 9.19%. The prevalence of cataract and cataract surgical coverage also significantly varies by region.

India's cataract-surgical rate rose from just over 700 operations per million people per year in 1981, to 6,000 per million per year in 2011, thus getting closer to the estimated requirement of 8,000–8,700 operations per million per year needed to eliminate cataract blindness in the country. The rate's rise was partly linked to factors such as increased efficiency due to improved surgical techniques, application of day-case surgery, improvements in operating theatre design, and efficient teamwork with sufficient staff.

=== Africa ===
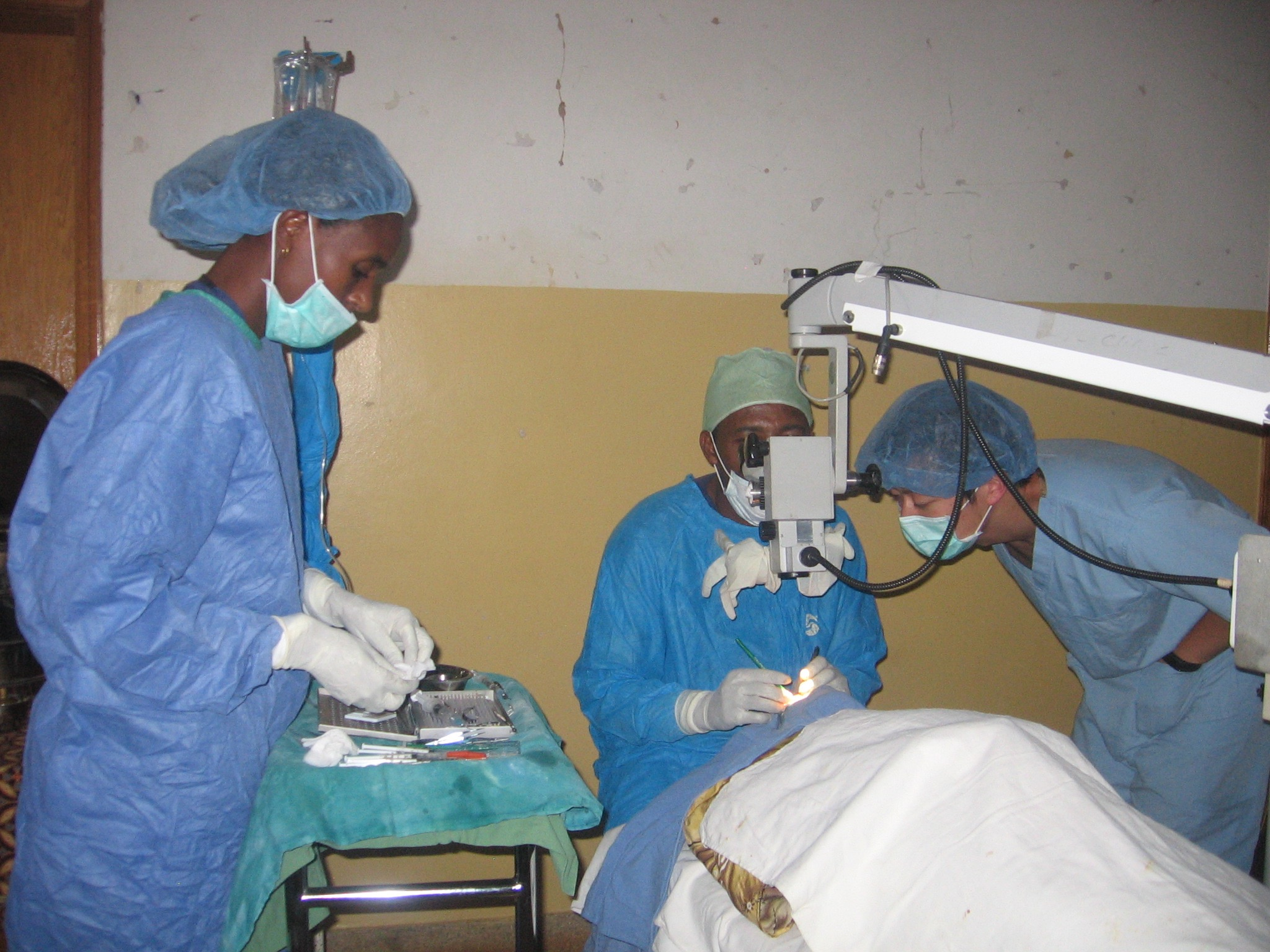
Cataract surgery in Bedele, Ethiopia

Cataracts are the main cause of blindness in Africa, and affect approximately half of the estimated seven million blind people on the continent, a number that is expected to increase with population growth by about 600,000 people per year. As of 2005, the estimated cataract-surgery rate was about 500 operations per million people per year. Progress on gathering information on epidemiology, distribution and impact of cataracts within the African continent has been made, but significant problems and barriers limiting further access to reliable data remain.

These barriers relate to awareness, acceptance, and cost; some studies also reported community and family dynamics as discouraging factors. Most of the studies held locally reported that cataract-surgical rate was lower in females. The higher cataract-surgery coverage found in some settings in South Africa, Libya, and Kenya suggest many barriers to surgery can be overcome.

According to the International Agency for the Prevention of Blindness, some sub-Saharan African countries have about one ophthalmologist per million people, while the National Center for Biotechnology Information stated the percentage of adults above the age of 50 in western sub-Saharan Africa who have developed cataract-induced blindness is about 6%—the highest rate in the world.

A mathematical model using survey data from sub-Saharan Africa showed the incidence of cataracts varies significantly across the continent, with the required rate of surgery to maintain a visual acuity level of 6/18 (20/60) ranging from about 1,200 to about 4,500 surgeries per year per million people, depending on the area. Such variations may relate to genetic or cultural differences, as well as life expectancy.

=== Latin America ===
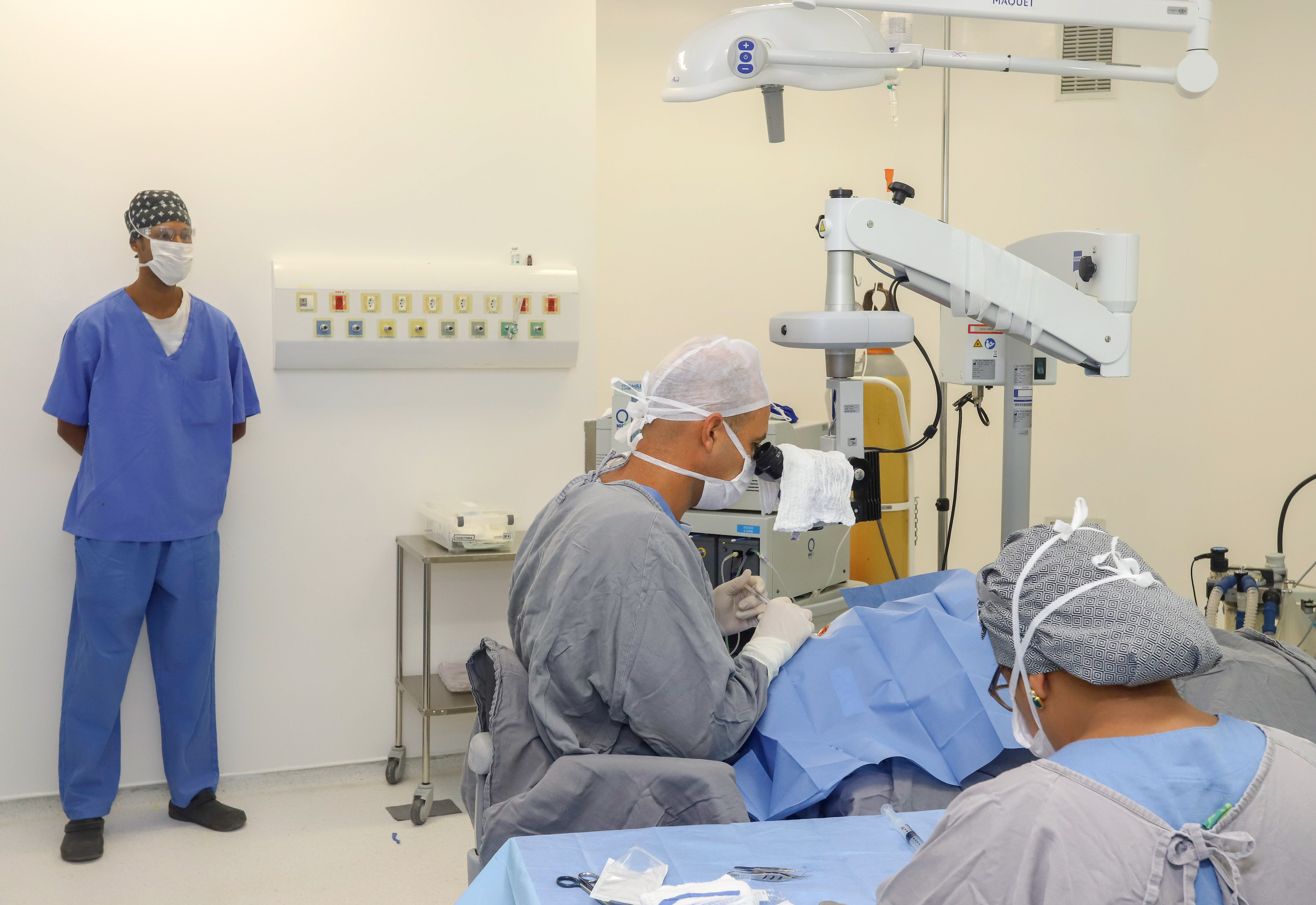
Cataract operation in São Paulo, Brazil

A four-year longitudinal study of 19 Latin American countries published in 2010 showed most of the countries had increased their surgery rates over that period, with increases of up to 186%, but still failed to provide adequate surgical coverage. The study also showed a significant correlation between gross national income per capita and cataract-surgery rate in the countries involved.

In a study published in 2014, the weighted-mean regional surgery rate was found to have increased by 70% from 2005 to 2012, rising from 1,562 to 2,672 cataract surgeries per million inhabitants. The weighted mean number of ophthalmologists per million inhabitants in the region was approximately 62. Cataract-surgery coverage widely varied across Latin America, ranging from 15% in El Salvador, to 77% in Uruguay. Barriers cited included cost of surgery and lack of awareness about available surgical treatment. The number of available ophthalmologists appeared to be adequate, but the number of those who practised eye surgery was unknown.

A 2009 study showed that the prevalence of cataract blindness in people 50 years and older ranged from 0.5% in Buenos Aires, to 2.3% in parts of Guatemala. Poor vision due to cataracts ranged from 0.9% in Buenos Aires, to 10.7% in parts of Peru. Cataract-surgical coverage ranged from good in parts of Brazil to poor in Paraguay, Peru, and Guatemala. Visual outcome after cataract surgery was close to conformity with WHO guidelines in Buenos Aires, where more than 80% of post-surgery eyes had visual acuity of 6/18 (20/60) or better, but ranged between 60% and 79% in most of the other regions, and was less than 60% in Guatemala and Peru.

== Social, economic and environmental relevance ==
It has been estimated there were 43.3 million blind people in 2020, and 295 million with moderate and severe visual impairment (MSVI), 55% of whom were female. The age-standardised global prevalence in blindness decreased by 28.5% between 1990 and 2020, but the age-standardised prevalence of MSVI increased by 2.5%. Cataract remained the global leading cause of blindness in 2020.

Cataract impairs vision and lowers quality of life. Improvements in vision help with daily activities, including work productivity and education. Cataract surgery reduces risk of falling and of dementia. It can prevent disability and is very cost effective, so it has large socioeconomic benefits, but the demand is great and the cost remains a large financial burden to public health systems.

The cost of cataract surgery depends on the type of procedure, whether it is provided privately or by a government hospital, whether it is provided by out-patient (day care) or in-patient surgery, and on the economic status of people in the region. Because of the high cost of the equipment, phacoemulsification is generally more expensive than ECCE and MSICS.

A 2021 study found that perioperative procedures before and after surgery differ considerably between various surgeons and institutions, which suggests the possibility for large amounts of unnecessary expenditure worldwide. Standardised best practice perioperative procedures can improve patient safety and have the potential to reduce unnecessary costs and unnecessary diagnostic procedures.

The restoration of functional vision or improvement in vision possible in most cases has a large social and economic impact; patients may be able to return to paid work or continue their previous jobs, and may not become dependent on support from their family or the wider society. Studies show a sustained improvement to quality of life, financial situation, physical well-being, and mental health. Cataract surgery is one of the most cost-effective health interventions, since its economic benefits considerably exceed the cost of treatment.

The 1998 World Health Report estimated 19.34 million people were bilaterally blind due to age-related cataracts, and that cataracts were responsible for 43% of all cases of blindness. This number and proportion were expected to increase due to population growth, and increased life expectancy approximately doubling the number of people older than 60 years. The global increase in blindness from cataract is estimated to be at least five million per year; a figure of 1,000 new cases per million population per year is used for planning purposes. The average outcomes of cataract surgery are improving, and consequently, surgery is being indicated at an earlier stage in cataract progression, increasing the number of operable cases. To reduce the backlog of patients, it is necessary to operate on more people per year than the new cases alone.

As of 1998, the rate of surgeries in economically developed countries was about 4,000 to 6,000 per million population per year, which was sufficient to meet demand. India raised the cataract surgery rate (CSR) to over 3,000, but this was not considered to be sufficient to reduce the backlog. Middle-income countries of Latin America and Asia have CSRs of between 500 and 2,000 per million per year, whereas China, most of Africa, and poor countries of Asia had rates of less than 500. In India and South East Asia, the rate required to keep up with the increase is at least 3,000 per million population per year; in Africa and other parts of the world with smaller percentages of older people, a rate of 2,000 may be sufficient in the short term.

In addition to the direct costs, associated surgical complications may require further intervention. In high income countries the environmental costs also tend to be higher. A phacoemulsification surgery in a UK hospital was estimated to cost more than 20 times the greenhouse gas emission of an equivalent surgery in an Indian hospital. Some of the unnecessary costs may be due to regulatory requirements that are based on perceived safety rather than actual safety.

== Special populations ==
=== Congenital cataracts ===
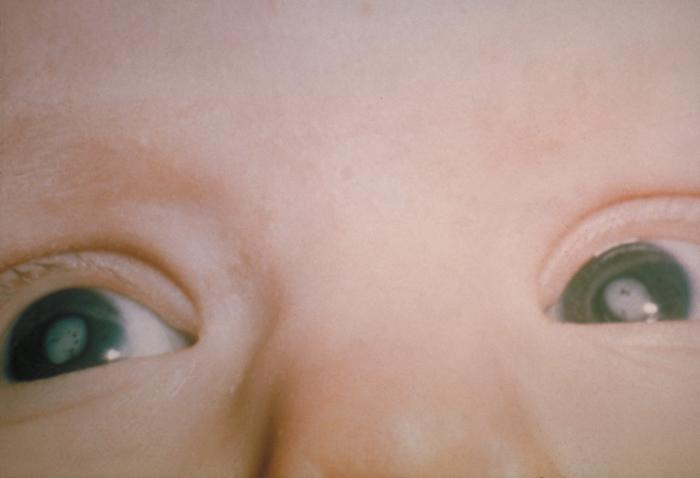
Bilateral cataracts in an infant due to congenital rubella syndrome

In general, there is greater urgency to remove dense cataracts from very young children because of the risk of amblyopia. For optimal visual development in newborns and young infants, a visually significant unilateral congenital cataract should be detected and removed before the child is six weeks old, while visually significant bilateral congenital cataracts should be removed before 10 weeks. Congenital cataracts that are too small to affect vision will not be removed or treated, but may be monitored by an ophthalmologist throughout the patient's life. Commonly, a patient with small congenital cataracts that do not damage vision will be affected later in life, though this will take decades to occur.

As of 2015, the standard of care for pediatric cataract surgery for children older than two years is primary posterior intraocular lens (IOL) implantation. Primary IOL implantation before the age of seven months is considered to have no advantages over aphakia. According to a 2015 study, primary IOL implantation in the seven-months-to-two-years age groups should be considered in children who require cataract surgery. Research into the possibility of regeneration of infant lenses from lens epithelial cells showed interesting results in a small trial study reported in 2016.

=== Higher risk for operations on separate occasions ===
Most patients have bilateral cataracts; although surgery in one eye can restore functional vision, second-eye surgery has many advantages, so most patients undergo surgery in each eye on separate days. Operating on both eyes on the same day as separate procedures is known as immediately sequential bilateral cataract surgery; this can decrease the number of hospital visits, thus reducing risk of contagion in an epidemic. Immediately sequential bilateral cataract surgery also has significant cost savings, and faster visual rehabilitation and neuroadaptation. (Note: Neuroadaptation: Changes in the brain which accommodate the presence of a new substance or condition, such as the admission of more blue light after removal of a yellow tinted cataract, or the inability to adjust the focus of an IOL by the ciliary muscles.) Another indication is significant cataracts in both eyes of patients for whom two rounds of anaesthesia and surgery would be unsuitable. The risk of simultaneous bilateral complications is low.

== Other animals ==
Cataract surgery in small animals such as dogs and cats is a routine ophthalmic procedure with a success rate of around 90%, and is usually better for eyes with relatively recent cataract development. The presence of other ocular problems may reduce the success rate. Procedures are similar to those for humans. General anesthesia is likely to be used, but sub-Tenon injection and a low-dose neuromuscular blockade protocol have also been used for canine cataract surgery.

== See also ==
- Media related to Cataract surgery at Wikimedia Commons
- Africa Cataract Project – Turkish non-governmental organization
- Eye surgery – Surgery performed on the eye or its adnexa
- Himalayan Cataract Project – U.S. nonprofit organization
- IOLVIP – Intraocular lens system to compensate for macular degeneration
- Ophthalmology – Field of medicine treating eye disorders
- Phakic intraocular lens implantation in series with the natural lens to correct vision in cases of high refractive errors.
- Refractive lens exchange, or clear lens extraction – Effectively use of the same procedures as for cataract surgery to replace a natural lens with high refractive error when other methods are not effective.
