= OVD =

OVD may refer to:

- OVD, IATA airport code for Asturias Airport, Asturias, Spain
- ovd, ISO 639-3 code for Elfdalian, a North Germanic language spoken in Sweden
- Online video distributor, also known as over-the-top media services
- Optical Variable Device, an iridescent image that exhibits various optical effects such as movement or color changes
- Ophthalmic viscosurgical device, a viscoelastic solution used in eye surgery
- Oracle Virtual Directory, a component of Oracle Fusion Middleware
- Old Vatted Demerara, a brand of rum distilled by William Grant & Sons
