= Intraocular lens power calculation =

Predicting the appropriate refractive power for a prosthetic lens implant

The aim of an accurate intraocular lens power calculation is to provide an intraocular lens (IOL) that fits the specific needs and desires of the individual patient. The development of better instrumentation for measuring the eye's axial length (AL) and the use of more precise mathematical formulas to perform the appropriate calculations have significantly improved the accuracy with which the surgeon determines the IOL power.In order to determine the power of intraocular lens, several values need to be known:

- Eye's axial length (AL)
- Corneal power (K)
- Postoperative IOL position within the eye known as estimated lens position (ELP)
- The anterior chamber constant: A-constant or another lens related constant

Of these parameters, the first two are measured before the implantation; the third parameter, the ELP, needs to be estimated mathematically before the implantation, and the last parameter is provided by the manufacturer of the intraocular lens.

== Axial length ==
The axial length (AL) is the distance between the anterior surface of the cornea and the fovea and usually measured by A-scan ultrasonography or optical coherence biometry. The AL is the most important factor in IOL calculation: A 1-mm error in AL measurement results in a refractive error of approximately 2.88 D or about 3.0-3.5 D error of IOL power in an average eye. A mean shortening of 0.25–0.33mm can translate into an error of IOL power by approximately 1 D.

=== Ultrasonography ===
In A-scan ultrasound biometry, a crystal oscillates to generate a high-frequency sound wave that penetrates into the eye. When the sound wave encounters a media interface, part of the sound wave is reflected back toward the probe. These echoes allow us to calculate the distance between the probe and various structures in the eye. Ultrasonography does not measure the distance but rather the time required for a sound pulse to travel from the cornea to the retina. The speed of sound varies in different parts of the eye. The eye is divided ultrasonographically into four components: cornea, anterior chamber, lens thickness and vitreous cavity. The velocity of sound in these compartments are 1620, 1532, 1641 and 1532 m/s respectively. Through normal eyes an average velocity of 1555 m/s is accepted for calculation. Modern instruments use separate sound velocities for the different eye components to obtain the total axial length. The measured transit time is converted to a distance using the formula d=t/v Where d is the distance, t is the time and v is the velocity.

Two types of A-scan ultrasound biometry are currently in use. The first is contact applanation biometry. This technique requires placing an ultrasound probe on the central cornea. While this is a convenient way to determine the axial length for most normal eyes, errors in measurement almost invariably result from the probe indenting the cornea and shallowing the anterior chamber. Since the compression error is variable, it cannot be compensated for by a constant. IOL power calculations using these measurements will lead to an overestimation of the IOL power. In shorter eyes, this effect is amplified. The second type is immersion A-scan biometry, which requires placing a saline filled scleral shell between the probe and the eye. Since the probe does not exert direct pressure on the cornea, compression of the anterior chamber is avoided. A mean shortening of 0.25–0.33mm has been reported between applanation and immersion axial length measurements, which can translate into an error of IOL power by approximately 1 D. In general, immersion biometry has been shown to be more accurate than contact applanation biometry in several studies. The main limitation with the A-scan ultrasound is the poor image resolution due to the use of a relatively long, low-resolution wavelength (10 MHz) to measure a relatively short distance. In addition, variations in retinal thickness surrounding the fovea contribute to inconsistency in the final measurement.

=== Partial coherence interferometry ===
The technique of partial coherence interferometry measures the time required for infrared light to travel to the retina. Because light travels at too high a speed to be measured directly, light interference methodology is used to determine the transit time and thus the AL. This technique does not require contact with the globe, so corneal compression artifacts are eliminated. Compared with ultrasonography, the partial coherence interferometry provides more accurate, reproducible AL measurement. However, it is difficult to obtain a measurement in the presence of a dense cataract or other media opacities, which limits the use of this technique.

Another advantage of PCI over ultrasound biometry is that the axial length measurement is performed through the visual axis since the patient is asked to fixate into the laser spot. In highly myopic or staphylomatous eyes, this can be particularly advantageous since it can sometimes be difficult to measure the true axial length through the visual axis with an ultrasound probe. PCI is also superior to ultrasound in the measurement of pseudophakic and silicone oil-filled eyes. For optical biometry, it is not as critical how the media change because the correction factor that must be applied is much smaller than in ultrasound biometry. The axial length obtained from PCI may be slightly longer than that obtained from ultrasound. This is due to PCI measuring the distance from the corneal surface to the RPE while ultrasound measures to the anterior retinal surface. Therefore, many IOL measurement machines require refined IOL constants unique to their mechanism.

=== Axial length: ultrasound versus optical biometry ===
For ultrasonography AL corresponds to the anterior retinal surface, whereas for optical biometry it corresponds to the retinal pigment epithelium (RPE)/Bruch's membrane (AL-RPE). AL can also be defined as the linear distance between the corneal surface and the inner limiting membrane (ILM) or AL-ILM. Since IOL power calculation formulas were developed earlier using ultrasound, the AL-ILM, each AL-RPE optical biometric measurement is converted to an AL-ILM by subtracting the retinal thickness, which is assumed to be 300 μm in all eyes.

== Corneal power ==
The central corneal power is the second important factor in the calculation formula. To simplify the calculation, the cornea is assumed to be a thin spherical lens with a fixed anterior to posterior corneal curvature ratio and an index of refraction of 1.3375. Central corneal power can be measured by keratometry or corneal topography. Corneal radius of curvature relates to corneal power with the equation: r = 337.5/K.

== IOL power calculation formulas ==
Intraocular lens power calculation formulas fall into two major categories: regression formulas and theoretical formulas. Regression formulas are now obsolete and modern theoretic formulas are used instead. The regression formulas are empiric formulas generated by averaging large numbers of postoperative clinical results (i.e. from retrospective computer analysis of data obtained from a great many patients who have undergone surgery). The most common regression formulas are the SRK and SRK II. In the 1980s SRK and SRK II were popular because they were simple to use. However, power error often resulted from the use of these formulas.

The SRK formula is calculated easily by hand as $P = A - 0.9 K - 2.5 L$, where $P$ is the IOL power to be used for emmetropia, $A$ is the IOL specific A constant, $K$ is the average corneal refractive power (diopters), and $L$ is the length of the eye (mm). The SRK II formula adjusts the A constant utilized depending on the axial length: increasing the A constant for short eyes and decreasing the A constant for long eyes.

Theoretical formulas are based on geometrical optics. The eye is considered a two lens system (i.e. IOL and cornea) and the predicted distance between them which is called the estimated lens position (ELP) is used to calculate the power of the IOL. All formulas require an estimation of the position that the IOL will sit in the eye, a factor known as the ELP, which is defined as the distance between the cornea and the IOL. ELP correlates with the placement of the IOL inside the eye, whether it is in the anterior chamber in the sulcus or in the capsular bag. It also varies with the implant's configuration and the location of its optical center. For example, the use of a meniscus lens calls for a smaller ELP value than a biconvex IOL.

IOL calculation formulas differ in the way they calculate ELP. In the original theoretical formula the ELP is considered a constant value of 4 mm for every lens in every patient. Better results are obtained by relating the expected ELP to the axial length and corneal curvature. Modern theoretical formulas predict ELP differently based on axial length and corneal power: ELP decreases in the shorter eyes and flat corneas and increases in the longer eyes and steeper corneas. The improvements in IOL power calculation are the result of improvements in the predictability of the ELP.

The best known modern formulas are SRK-T, Holladay 1, Holladay 2, Hoffer-Q and Haigis. These formulas are programmed into the IOLMaster, Lenstar and most modern ultrasonographic instruments, thus eliminating any need for regression formulas.

In recent years, artificial intelligence (AI) has been applied to intraocular lens (IOL) power calculations, offering new levels of accuracy for complex and atypical eyes. One of the most advanced AI-based tools is GAID (Genuine Artificial Intelligence for Decision), an online IOL calculator accessible at calciol.com. By leveraging machine learning, GAID enhances IOL power prediction by modeling nonlinear relationships in biometric data and estimating the effective lens position (ELP) more accurately than traditional formulas. GAID is available online to clinicians and researchers worldwide through the platform calciol.com, where users can access the calculator interface, API, and supporting documentation. Other AI-driven calculators include the Hill-RBF Method, which uses pattern recognition via radial basis functions, and the Ladas Super Formula AI, which combines several theoretical formulas using a supervised AI algorithm. These tools signal a growing shift from purely geometric or regression-based formulas to data-driven methods in ophthalmology.

== A-constant ==
The A-constant was originally designed for the SRK equation and depends on multiple variables including IOL manufacturer, refraction index, style and placement within the eye. Because of its simplicity, the A-constant became the value used to characterize intraocular implants.

A-constants are used directly in SRK II and SRK/T formulas. The constant is a theoretical value that relates the lens power to AL and keratometry, it is not expressed in units and is specific to the design of the IOL and its intended location and orientation within the eye.

Using A-constants is practical when a decision on the implant power has to be made during surgery because the power of the lens varies in a 1:1 relationship with the A-constants: if A decreases by 1 diopter, IOL power decreases by 1 diopter also. This straight relationship adds to the simplicity and popularity of the A-constant. Other constants used in modern IOL formulas include the ACD value in Binkhorst and Hoffer-Q formulas, the a_{0}, a_{1}, and a_{2} constants of the Haigis formula, and the Surgeon factor (SF) in Holladay formulas. True anterior chamber depth (ACD) is measured between the posterior corneal surface and the anterior lens surface. This measure is not to be confused with the anterior chamber constant (ACD constant) used in IOL power calculation formulas.

All lens constants are estimates, to begin with. To obtain the best possible results, it is imperative that these constants be optimized. Optimization is a process that is user-specific and incorporates the various systematic errors attributable to measurement of ocular parameters. In order to optimize a lens-constant, the user must back calculate the formula so that the actual post-operative refractive error is included. This means that one must calculate the constant so that a recalculation of the formula would predict exactly the same refractive error as actually observed.

== Intraocular lens power calculation after refractive surgery ==
Cataract extraction following refractive surgery poses special problems for the patient and the surgeon because the corneal change as a result of refractive surgery complicates accurate keratometry, a key element of lens implant power calculation. After laser refractive surgery for myopia, this could result in overestimation of corneal power, underestimation of the IOL power required, and hyperopic outcomes after cataract surgery.

The difficulty arises from several factors:

- The instruments used by ophthalmologists to measure the corneal power (keratometers, corneal topographers) cannot obtain accurate measurements in eyes that have undergone corneal refractive surgery. Most manual keratometers measure at the 3-mm zone of the central cornea, which often misses the central flatter zone of effective corneal power.
- The assumed index of refraction of the normal cornea is based on the relationship between the anterior and posterior corneal curvatures. This relationship is changed in LASIK eyes.
- Most IOL power formulas use the axial length and keratometric reading (K) to predict the position of the IOL postoperatively (ELP). In post-LASIK eyes this causes an error in this prediction because the anterior chamber dimensions do not really change in these eyes commensurately with the much flatter K. In order to address this problem the double-K method was developed, which uses the pre-LASIK corneal power for the calculation of the ELP, and the post-LASIK corneal power for the calculation of the Vergence component of the formula.

== Auditing of results ==
Auditing of results helps to compare formulae and optimisation strategies amongst each other. Due to considerable confusion in the past, a clear set of guidelines now exists to report IOL power related data. There are six key measures that are to be reported. In recognition of the fact that comparison of ideal IOL powers is likely to be error-prone, all comparisons are done for actual or predicted refractive errors.

1. Mean Error (ME) and standard deviation (SD) in prediction.

2. Mean Absolute Error (MAE) and standard deviation (SD) in prediction.

3. The percentage of eyes ± 0.5 D from the predicted target refraction.

4. The percentage of eyes ± 1.0 D from the predicted target refraction.

5. The percentage of eyes > 2.0 D from the predicted target refraction.

6. Range of errors from maximum plus error to maximum minus error.

Software tools can be used in order to perform an audit.

== See also ==
- Intraocular Lens
