= Vitreous bulge =

Type of complication in the eye

A vitreous bulge is a distortion or protrusion of the vitreous membrane into the anterior chamber of the eye, caused by pressure on the eye or iris. It is a relatively common complication during or following cataract surgery or extraction.

A vitreous bulge can lead to a rupture and leakage of vitreous humor into the eye, a condition which requires immediate attention and is treated with corneal/scleral sutures.
