= Intracameral injection =

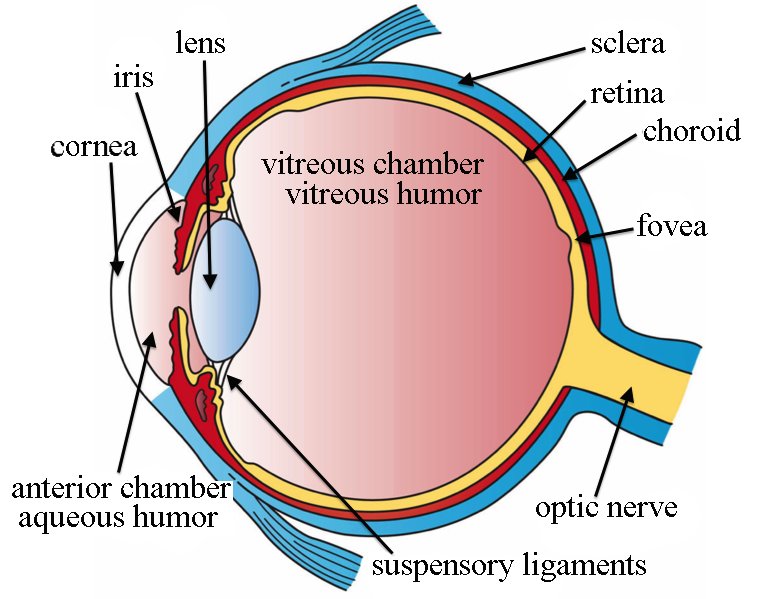
- Intravitreal administration delivers substances directly into the anterior chamber of eyeball.
- Specialty: Ophthalmology

An intracameral injection is usually of an antibiotic into the anterior chamber of the eyeball to prevent endophthalmitis caused by an infection of the eye that can occur after cataract surgery. The Food and Drug Administration (FDA) has not approved antibiotics for this use and it is considered 'off-label'. Concerns about this procedure contributing to increasing numbers of antibiotic resistant bacteria have been expressed.

In the UK, Aprokam cefuroxime has been approved for use in intracameral injections. Intracameral injection of recombinant tissue plasminogen activator (r-TPA) has been found to be effective in treating the development of fibrin intraocularly after the development of endophthalmitis.
