= Vitreous touch syndrome =

- Other names: Vitreous wick syndrome
- Specialty: Ophthalmology

Vitreous touch syndrome is a late complication of intra-capsular cataract extraction wherein the vitreous bulges through the pupillary aperture, and touches and attaches to the corneal endothelium.
