= Bullous keratopathy =

- Other names: Pseudophakic bullous keratopathy (PBK)
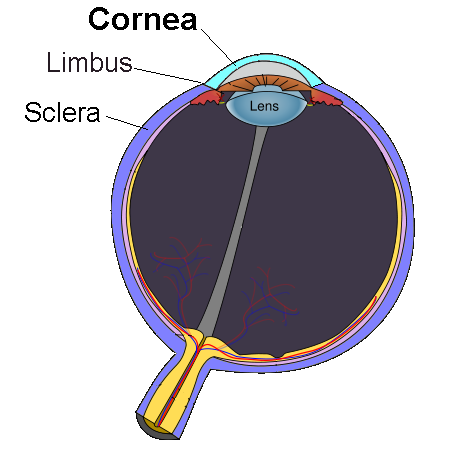
- Bullous keratopathy is a condition that occurs in the cornea
- Specialty: Ophthalmology

Bullous keratopathy, also known as pseudophakic bullous keratopathy (PBK), is a pathological condition in which small vesicles, or bullae, are formed in the cornea due to endothelial dysfunction.

In a healthy cornea, endothelial cells keeps the tissue from excess fluid absorption, pumping it back into the aqueous humor. When affected by some reason, such as Fuchs' dystrophy or a trauma during cataract removal, endothelial cells suffer mortality or damage. The corneal endothelial cells normally do not undergo mitotic cell division, and cell loss results in permanent loss of function. When endothelial cell counts drop too low, the pump starts failing to function and fluid moves anterior into the stroma and epithelium. The excess fluid precipitates swelling of the cornea. As fluid accumulates between the basal epithelium cells, blister like formations form (bullae) and they undergo painful ruptures releasing their fluid content to the surface. These characteristic malformations disrupt vision and create pain sensations.

== Symptoms and signs ==
Disease begins with vesicles that coalesce. There is severe progressing edema and rupture may occur in 24 hours or less.

== Diagnosis ==
The diagnosis is arrived by slit lamp examination for epithelial edema, microcysts, and bullae. Imaging studies like specular microscopy for photographic mapping of the corneal endothelium, ultrasound pachymetry for the thickness of the endothelium and optical pachymetry for depth of the disease involvement.

== Treatment ==
Treatment can include hyperosmotic eye drops to reduce swelling (5% sodium chloride), bandage contact lenses to reduce discomfort, glaucoma medications to reduce the flow of fluid into the cornea, and surgical procedures . The most common types of surgical treatment are Descemet's stripping automated endothelial keratoplasty (DSAEK) and Descemet's membrane endothelial keratoplasty (DMEK). Cell therapies using invitro cultured cadaver corneal endothelial precursor cells have been reported with short and long term follow-up. This approach of in vitro expansion of human cadaver donor corneal endothelial precursors have a potential to help overcome the donor corneal shortage as one cadaver donor corneal tissue derived cells have been reported in a clinical study helping to restore the vision in three patients' eyes, referred as "an-eye-for-eyes-mission"

== Prognosis ==
Keratopathy is common in older people. Keratopathy occurs after cataract surgery, its incidence has decreased since the advent of intraoperative viscoelastic agents that protect the endothelium.
