= Ophthalmic viscosurgical device =

Viscoelatic materials used in ophthalmic surgery to maintain eye shape

Ophthalmic viscosurgical devices (OVDs) are a class of clear gel-like material used in eye surgery to maintain the volume and shape of the anterior chamber of the eye, and protect the intraocular tissues during the procedure. They were originally called viscoelastic substances, or just viscoelastics. Their consistency allows the surgical instruments to move through them, but when there is low shear stress they do not flow, and retain their shape, preventing collapse of the anterior chamber. OVDs are available in several formulations which may be combined or used individually as best suits the procedure, and are introduced into the anterior chamber at the start of the procedure, and removed at the end. Their tendency to remain coherent helps with removal, as the cohesive variants tend to be drawn into the aspiration orifice without breaking up.

== Uses ==
OVDs are used to protect the corneal endothelium from mechanical trauma and to maintain volume and form of the intraocular space during an open incision. The OVD is introduced into the space by syringe through a cannula. At the end of the procedure they are removed by aspiration and the space filled with a compatible fluid such as a buffered saline solution.OVDs are commonly used in cataract, cornea, glaucoma, eye trauma, and vitreoretinal surgery.

== Contraindications ==
Despite the side effects, the advantages of OVDs have made them indispensable in ophthalmic surgery involving the anterior chamber.

There are no known contraindications to the use of a Sodium Hyaluronate Ophthalmic Viscosurgical Device as a surgical aid in ophthalmic anterior segment procedures.

== Adverse effects ==
OVDs can cause excessive post-operative intraocular pressure, particularly if any is left remaining in the eye after surgery. The pressure rise is dose-related. It develops in the first day and will usually resolve spontaneously within three days. This effect is assumed to be a consequence of the large molecules of the OVD causing reduced outflow in the trabecular meshwork. Various drugs have been used to limit pressure spikes, and while effective, are not entirely predictable in their effects.

OVD can be trapped behind the IOL in the capsule during normal surgery, and may cause a forward displacement of the IOL, which in turn shifts the focal plane of the IOL towards near vision.

== Properties ==
The properties of an ideal OVD would include:

- Ease of placement, low viscosity during placement, and low tendency to entrain bubbles
- Retention under positive pressure in the eye
- Retention during phacoemulsification
- Does not interfere with use of instruments or placement of the IOL.
- Protects the endothelium
- Nontoxic, sterile, and does not affect intraocular pressure
- Does not obstruct aqueous outflow
- Optically clear, allowing an unobstructed view.
- Easy removal, or no removal required after use

The most relevant physical properties for use in ophthalmic surgery are viscoelasticity, viscosity, pseudoplasticity, and surface tension.

These physical properties of an OVD are consequences of molecular chain length, and molecular interactions between chains. The rheologic properties of an OVD directly affect its clinical characteristics. An OVD can be chosen that best matches the requirements for a specific procedure, or part of a procedure, and combinations may be useful.

Viscoelasticity is the property of materials that exhibit both viscous and elastic characteristics when undergoing deformation. Viscous materials, like water, resist shear flow and strain linearly with time when a stress is applied. Elastic materials strain when stretched and immediately return to their original state once the stress is removed. Viscoelasticity allows the OVD to retain its shape under low shear stress, and to spring back into shape after a low deforming stress is removed, but also allow instruments to be moved relatively freely when the critical shear stress is exceeded.

Viscosity is a measure of its the resistance to shear deformation in a fluid at a given rate, or its resistance to flow. It quantifies the internal frictional force between adjacent layers of fluid that are in relative motion. The viscosity of a Newtonian fluid does not vary significantly with the rate of deformation.

Pseudoplasticity is the characteristic of a material to rapidly transform from a gel-like consistency to a liquid and back as the shear stress is varied. A high molecular weight, high viscosity OVD at rest retains its shape well. When under sufficient shear stress it will flow, and alignment of the molecules reduces viscosity to allow rapid flow. Under low shear stress the OVD will quickly revert to an elastic gel, which is a good shock absorber. The highest shear rates occur when the OVD is passed through a cannula, in which state viscosity becomes nearly independent of molecular weight. When the molecules are aligned in the direction of flow, viscosity is determined almost entirely by the concentration.

Surface tension: The coating ability of an OVD is determined partly by the intermolecular cohesive forces within the OVD, and partly adhesive forces between the OVD and the contacted tissue, instrument or IOL. The contact angle between a drop of the OVD and the other material on a flat surface is an indicator of the ability of the OVD to wet and coat that material. Surface tension is a measure of the cohesion between molecules of the OVD, so a lower surface tension and higher adhesion and contact angle indicate a better ability to wet. A solution of sodium hyaluronate has a significantly higher surface tension and contact angle with the relevant tissues than a solution of chondroitin sulfate, HPMC, or a mixture of sodium hyaluronate and chondroitin sulfate, which indicates better coating by the latter materials.

=== Cohesion and dispersion ===
Cohesive type OVDs adhere to themselves. They have high viscosity and act like a gel. The molecules have long chains, with high molecular weight, and have high surface tension and pseudoplasticity. They are relatively easy to aspirate as they tend to stay in one piece as they are drawn towards the suction orifice.

Dispersive tyes have lower surface tension and tend to spread and wet contact surfaces. They have lower viscosity, the molecules are not as strongly mutually attracted, they show low pseudoplasticity and have shorter molecular chains and lower molecular weight.

== Mechanism of action ==
The OVD occupies the volume of the anterior chamber during surgery, maintains its volume and shape without requiring internal pressure, and does not flow out through open incisions when undisturbed. It allows the free passage of instruments, prevents low viscosity fluids from leaking out, and provides the surgeon with a clear view of the internal volume. The cohesive nature of some types facilitates rapid removal by aspiration at the end of the procedure.

== Manufacturing ==
OVDs are sterile aqueous saline solutions of one or more viscoelatic compounds and buffers to control pH at 7 to 7.5.

=== Viscoelastic compounds ===
- Sodium hyaluronate, is a linear polysaccharide molecule of sodium glycuronate and N-acetyl glucosamine. It is commercially extracted from rooster combs or produced by bacterial fermentation.
- Chondroitin sulfate extracted from shark fin cartilage.
- Hydroxypropyl methylcellulose (Hypromellose) is extracted from wood pulp.

== History ==
Meyer and Palmer isolated hyaluronic acid from the vitreous cortex in 1934. Also in 1934, Endre A. Balazs extracted and purified hyaluronic acid from rooster combs and umbilical cord.In 1958, Balazs suggested the possibility of using hyaluronic acid as a substitute for the vitreous substitute during surgery for retinal detachment, and in 1972 made the first injection of hyaluronic acid into the vitreous chamber.

Ophthalmic viscosurgical devices were introduced in 1972. Various alternative formulations with varied physical characteristics have been developed since then.

Balazs developed the procedure of viscosurgery, coined the term, and patented high molecular weight viscoelastic material using purified hyaluronic acid to be used for implantation of IOLs.

In 1976 an application for the use of the OVD Healon was made with the FDA, and the next year applications were made for its use in surgery for cataracts, IOL implantation, glaucoma, and corneal transplants. In 1979, 510k permission was granted to market Healon, and FDA approval in January 1983. Since then OVDs have become essential tools in ophthalmic surgery.

Polyacrylamide is a synthetic compound that was used for a while but withdrawn from the market in 1991, after its use was found to be associated with elevated intraocular pressure.

== See also ==
- Cataract surgery – Removal of opacified lens from the eye
- Phacoemulsification – Method of cataract surgery
