= Capsulotomy =

Incision into the capsule of the crystalline lens of the eye

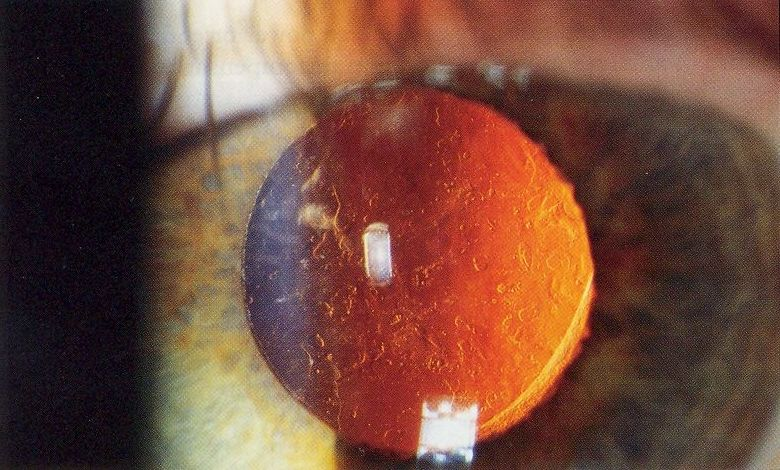
- Capsular opacification after cataract surgery
- ICD-9-CM: 13.19
- MeSH: D002387

Capsulotomy (BrE /kæpsjuː'lɒtəmi/, AmE /kæpsuː'lɑːtəmi/) is a type of eye surgery in which an opening is made to the capsule of the crystalline lens of the eye. The most common forms of cataract surgery remove nearly all of the crystalline lens but do not remove the peripheral or posterior crystalline lens capsule (the outer layer overlying the crystalline lens). The crystalline lens capsule is retained and used to contain and position an intraocular lens implant (IOL).There are two types of lens capsulotomy, anterior and posterior.

== Anterior capsulotomy ==
The removal of the central part of the anterior lens capsule during cataract surgery is known as anterior capsulotomy. It gives the surgeon access to the lens inside so that it can be removed. The remaining part of the capsule is left in place and provides a barrier between the anterior and posterior chambers that prevents leakage of the vitreous into the anterior chamber, and provides a natural support for an implanted intraocular lens in the optimum position.

=== Types ===
==== Can opener capsulotomy ====
A “can opener” capsulotomy is done by making a circular opening of 5–6 mm diameter in the anterior capsule, by series of small cuts or tears made with a cystitome. Jacques Daviel invented this technique in 1752. This technique was commonly done during extracapsular cataract extraction (ECCE). It often leaves weak areas at the junction between cuts, which predisposes the edge to further tearing under stress. It is rarely used today as it has been replaced by the continuous tear circular capsulorhexis. (CCC).

==== Manual capsulorhexis ====
Manual capsulorhexis and particularly the commonly used technique known as continuous curvilinear capsulorhexis (CCC), is used to remove the anterior part of the capsule of the lens by shear and tensile forces. In effect, by controlled tearing, as opposed to cutting. A well constructed capsulorhexis using the method has good circularity and no stress raisers along the edge of the tear. The method can efficiently create different sizes of smooth and circular capsulotomy with a strong edge that resists tearing during the cortical removal and lens implantation of cararact surgery.

==== Femtosecond laser-assisted capsulotomy ====
This technique uses a femtosecond laser to do the capsulotomy. The laser produces a precisely spaced row of adjacent perforations through the capsule, and can produce uniformly circular, accurately centred cuts compared with manual CCC, but the edges are relatively rough and this can reduce tear strength due to stress concentrations, though statistically the incidence of tears is low. The equipment is also expensive, and the method is associated with higher incidence of capsular block syndrome.

==== Plasma blade capsulotomy ====
Plasma blade capsulotomy uses plasma technology to make a circular incision through the anterior capsule. The energy destroys the molecular structure, and caused transient microscopic plasma and cavitation bubbles in the tissue. The power output and heating effects are small, it does not cause bleeding, and when used correctly there is no collateral tissue damage. There is no tearing stress applied to the capsule during the cut, and the tip cuts along the line of contact with the capsule, as guided by the surgeon. The cut edge may not be as strong as the edge produced by manual CCC.

==== Precision Pulse Capsulotomy/Zepto ====
Precision Pulse Capsulotomy is a non laser capsulotomy procedure performed using a device with a soft collapsible tip and circular Nitinol cutting element that is connected to a control console. The Nitinol tip can be collapsed sufficiently to pass through an incision of about 2.2 mm, after which it springs back into circular shape inside the anterior chamber. The device is moved into contact with the anterior capsule, held in position by suction, and uses 4 millisecond electrical pulses to make a circular incision of exact size and shape, without overheating the chamber. The edge of the incision is smooth, but care must be taken to ensure a complete cut.

== Posterior capsulotomy ==
Months or years after the cataract operation, the remaining posterior lens capsule can become opaque and vision will be reduced in about 20–25% of eyes. This is known as posterior capsule opacification (PCO). PCO is best treated by posterior capsulotomy using YAG laser.

=== Complications ===
Retinal detachment, ocular hypertension and IOL dislocation are the major complications of posterior capsulotomy.
