= IOLVIP =

Intraocular lens system to compensate for macular degeneration

Diagram describing the IOLVIP procedure

The Intraocular Lens for Visually Impaired Patients (IOLVIP or IOL-VIP) is an intraocular lens system aiming to treat patients with poor central vision due to age related macular degeneration. The IOLVIP procedure involves the surgical implantation of a pair of lenses that magnify and divert the image using the principals of the Galilean telescope. By arranging the lenses it is possible to direct the image to a different part of the eye than the fovea, which is the centre of the macula and is usually used for detailed vision. The magnified image is projected on to a part of the eye not normally used for detailed vision. Magnification and patient training are both necessary to allow useful vision from this part of the retina.

It is a procedure to give symptomatic relief rather than treat disease and is best understood as an implanted miniature telescope.

The procedure was pioneered in Italy and has since been taken to the UK and USA. It should not be used in anyone with active (that is changing) macular degeneration. It can be used in both "burned out" wet macular degeneration and in dry or atrophic macular degeneration. A telescopic simulator can be used to assess whether the surgery might be helpful, and to establish the best rotation for the two lenses.
