= Sub-Tenon injection =

Ocular route of drug administration

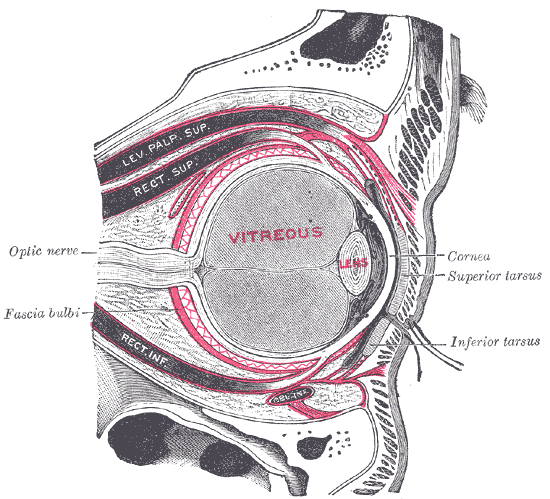
Sagittal section of the human eye showing the Tenon's capsule, labelled Fascia bulbi

Sub-Tenon injection is an ocular route of drug administration. It involves administration of a medication to the area between the sclera and the Tenon's capsule.

Posterior sub-Tenons steroid injections (PSTSI) is used in the treatment of posterior ocular inflammation, such as chronic uveitis. This route is also reported to be used to administer triamcinolone acetonide (a corticosteroid) in the treatment of macular telangiectasia type 1.

Also, it is used in the ocular anesthesia.
