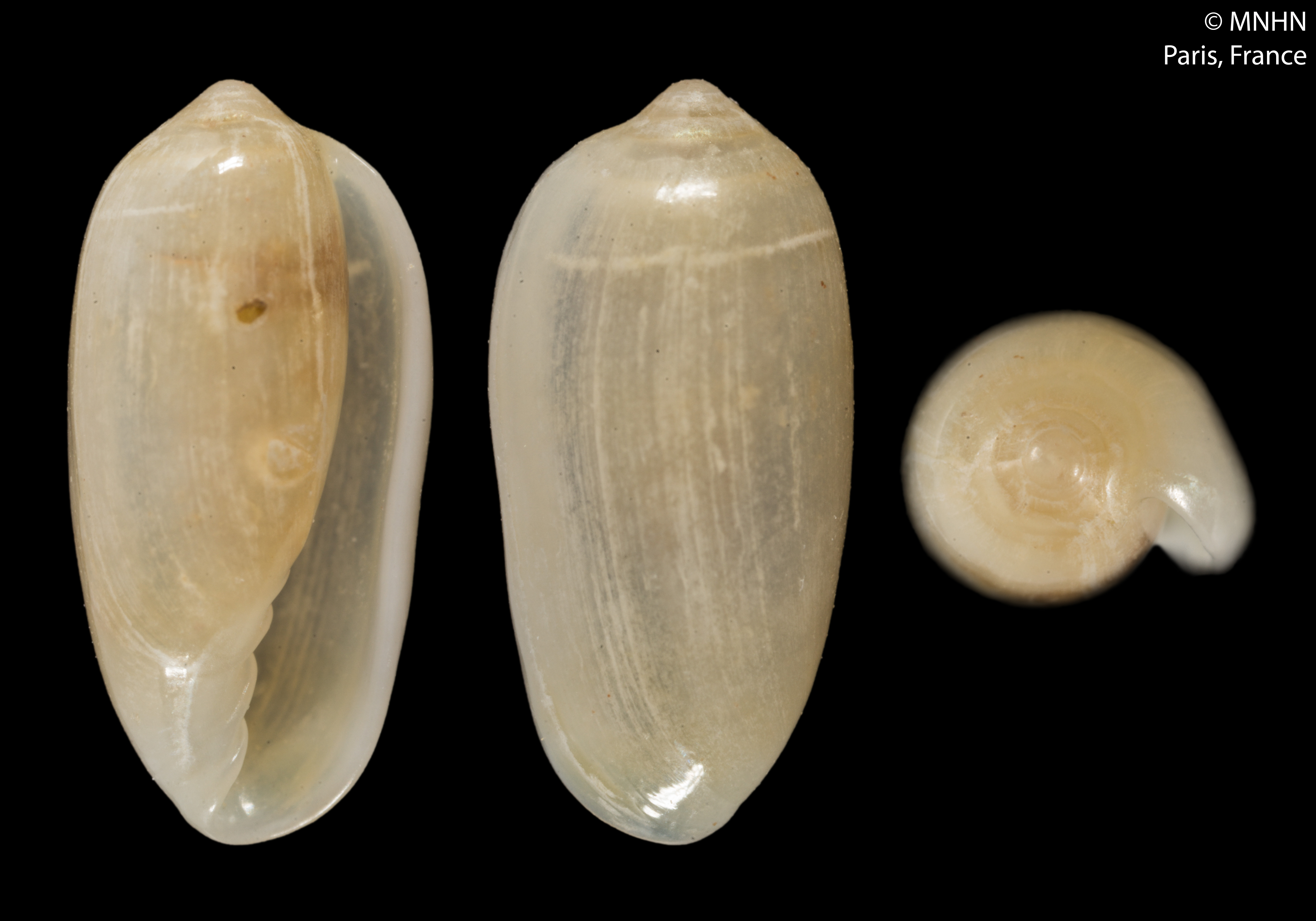
- Shell of Volvarina algazaliae (holotype in the MNHN, Paris)

Scientific classification
- Kingdom: Animalia
- Phylum: Mollusca
- Class: Gastropoda
- Subclass: Caenogastropoda
- Order: Neogastropoda
- Family: Marginellidae
- Subfamily: Marginellinae
- Genus: Volvarina
- Species: V. algazaliae

Binomial name
- Volvarina algazaliae Ortea, 2014

= Volvarina algazaliae =

Species of gastropod

Volvarina algazaliae is a species of sea snail, a marine gastropod mollusk in the family Marginellidae, the margin snails.

== Description ==
=== Body Symmetry ===
Volvarina algazaliae exhibits dextral coiling in its body symmetry. This means that its coiled shell typically spirals to the right.

=== Cellularity ===
This species is multicellular, which is the most common cellular organisation in the animal kingdom. Multicellular organisms are composed of multiple specialised cells working together to form tissues and organs.

=== Geographic Distribution ===
Volvarina algazaliae is found in the geographic region of Guadeloupe.

=== Habitat ===
This species primarily inhabits marine benthic environments. "Benthic" refers to the ecological region at the bottom of a body of water, such as the sea or an ocean. Marine benthic habitats can include the seabed and the substrate of the ocean floor.

=== Locomotion ===
Volvarina algazaliae moves through mucus-mediated gliding. This implies that it secretes mucus to help it move across its environment, likely the substrate in the benthic habitat.

=== Mineralized Skeleton ===
The species has a mineralized skeleton that contains calcium carbonate. Calcium carbonate is a common mineral found in the shells of many marine mollusks, providing structural support and protection.

=== Reproduction ===
Volvarina algazaliae reproduces through sexual reproduction.

=== Trophic Guild ===
This species occupies the trophic guild of a predator. As a predator, it likely feeds on other organisms as a primary food source.

=== Visual System ===
Volvarina algazaliae possesses lensed eyes, indicating that it has developed specialised structures for vision. These eyes likely help it detect and navigate its surroundings, potentially assisting in its predation and other behaviours.

== Distribution ==
Volvarina algazaliae is usually found in Guadeloupe, in the Caribbean Sea.

Volvarina algazaliae is commonly found in the shaded region
