= Lens capsule =

Membrane surrounding the lens within the eyeball

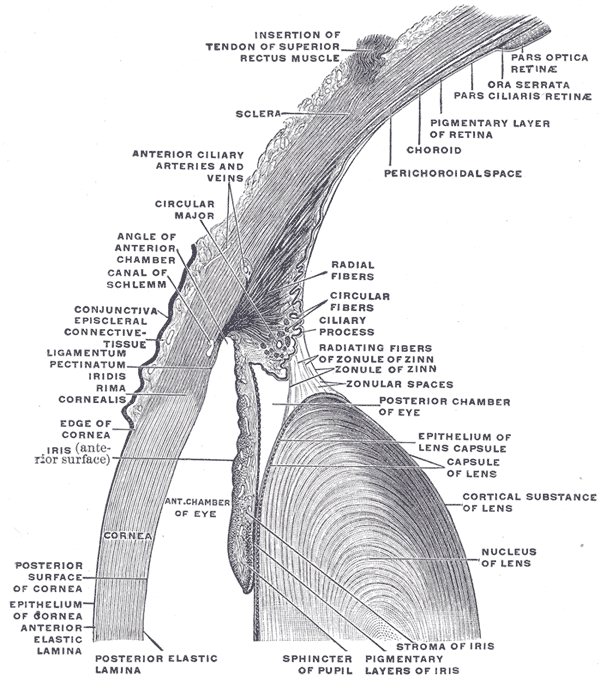
- The upper half of a sagittal section through the front of the eyeball. (Lens capsule labeled at center right.)

Details

Identifiers
- Latin: capsula lentis
- MeSH: D007903
- TA98: A15.2.05.007
- FMA: 58881

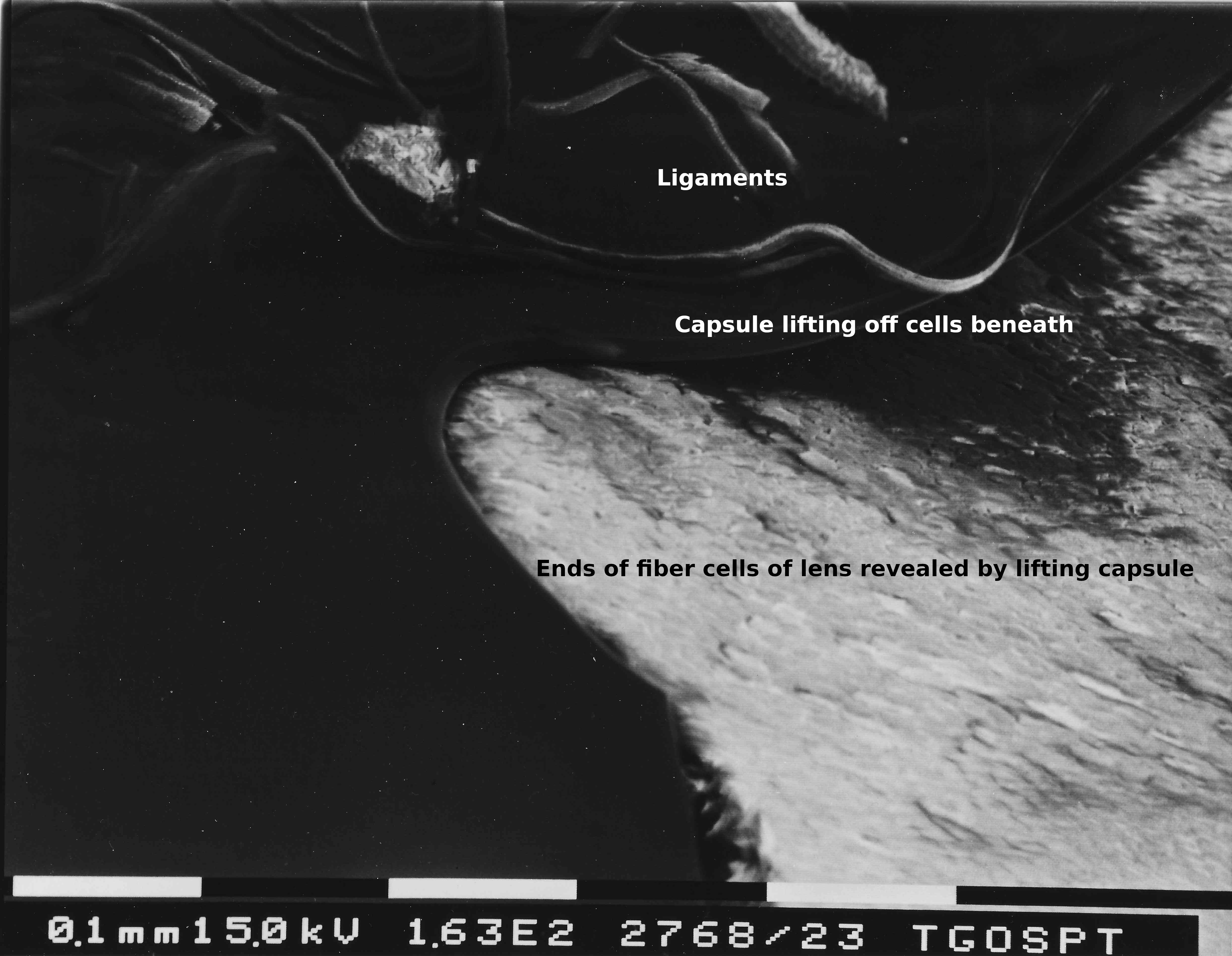
Sheep eye lens capsule with ligaments attached. The capsule is lifting off the lens showing cell fiber ends beneath.

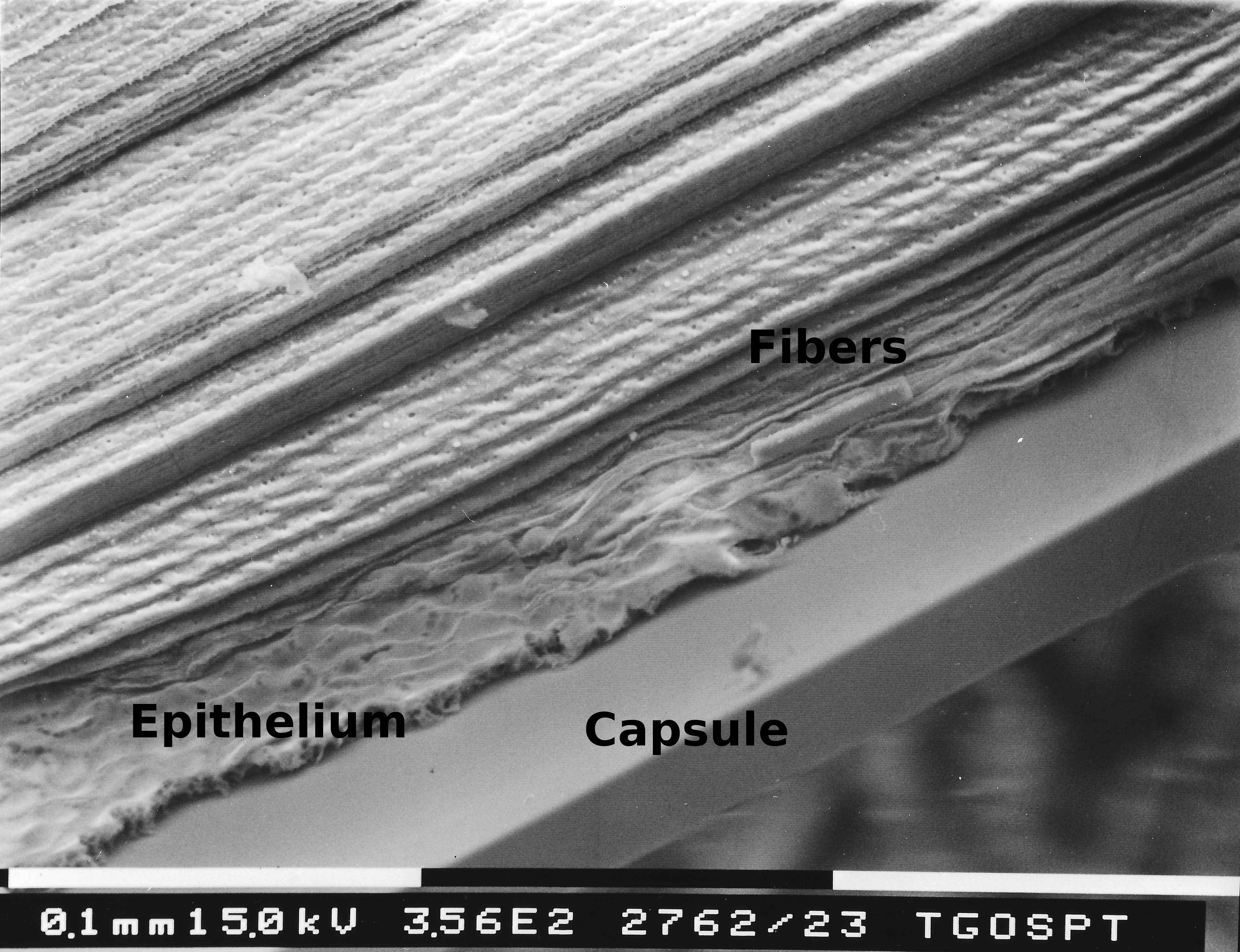
Microscope image of lens capsule in relation to lens cell types

The lens capsule is a component of the globe of the eye. It is a clear elastic basement membrane similar in composition to other basement membranes in the body. The capsule is a very thick basement membrane and the thickness varies in different areas on the lens surface and with the age of the animal. It is composed of various types of fibers such as collagen IV, laminin, etc. and these help it stay under constant tension. The capsule is attached to the surrounding eye by numerous suspensory ligaments and in turn suspends the rest of the lens in an appropriate position. As the lens grows throughout life so must the capsule. Due to the shape of the capsule, the lens naturally tends towards a rounder or more globular configuration, a shape it must assume for the eye to focus at a near distance. Tension on the capsule is varied to allow the lens to subtly change shape to allow the eye to focus in a process called accommodation.

Early in embryonic development the lens capsule is highly vascularized, but later during embryo development becomes avascular and transparent, serving as a diffusion barrier helping to protect the lens. It is permeable to low molecular weight compounds, but restricts the movement of larger things like bacteria, viruses and large colloidal particles. As the capsule contains the lens, it is clinically significant in regard to surgery of the lens. For example, it is used to contain new artificial lenses implanted after cataract surgery.

== Anatomy ==
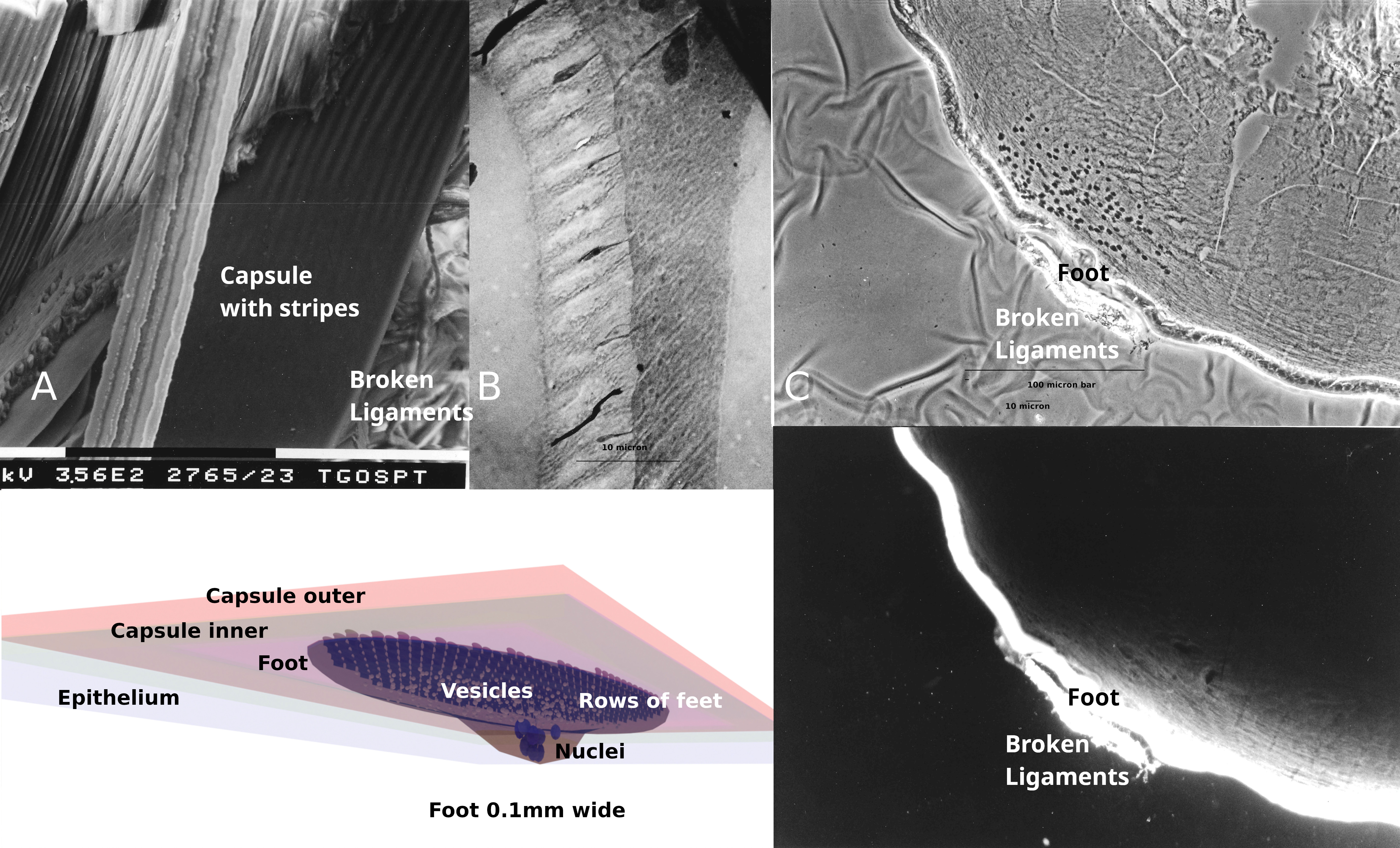
Micrographs and 3D drawing of a "foot" structures on eye lens capsules

The lens capsule is a transparent membrane that surrounds the entire lens. Capsule thickness varies depending on an animal's age and species. In humans the capsule is thinnest at the posterior pole with approximate thickness of 3.5 μm. Average thickness at the equator is 7 μm. Anterior pole thickness increases with age from 11 to 15 μm. The thickest portion is the annular region surrounding the anterior pole. This will also increase with age (from 13.5 to 16 μm). The ligaments suspending the lens form attachments in the equatorial area and more so just to the front and back of the equator. There are tens of thousands of these ligaments in a mouse lens and for the most part they appear to connect directly to the lens capsule. As the lens grows throughout the life of most vertebrates, the capsule is required to grow as well. As shown in the accompanying micrographs and diagrams, equatorial cells can have periodic cellular processes penetrating the capsule.

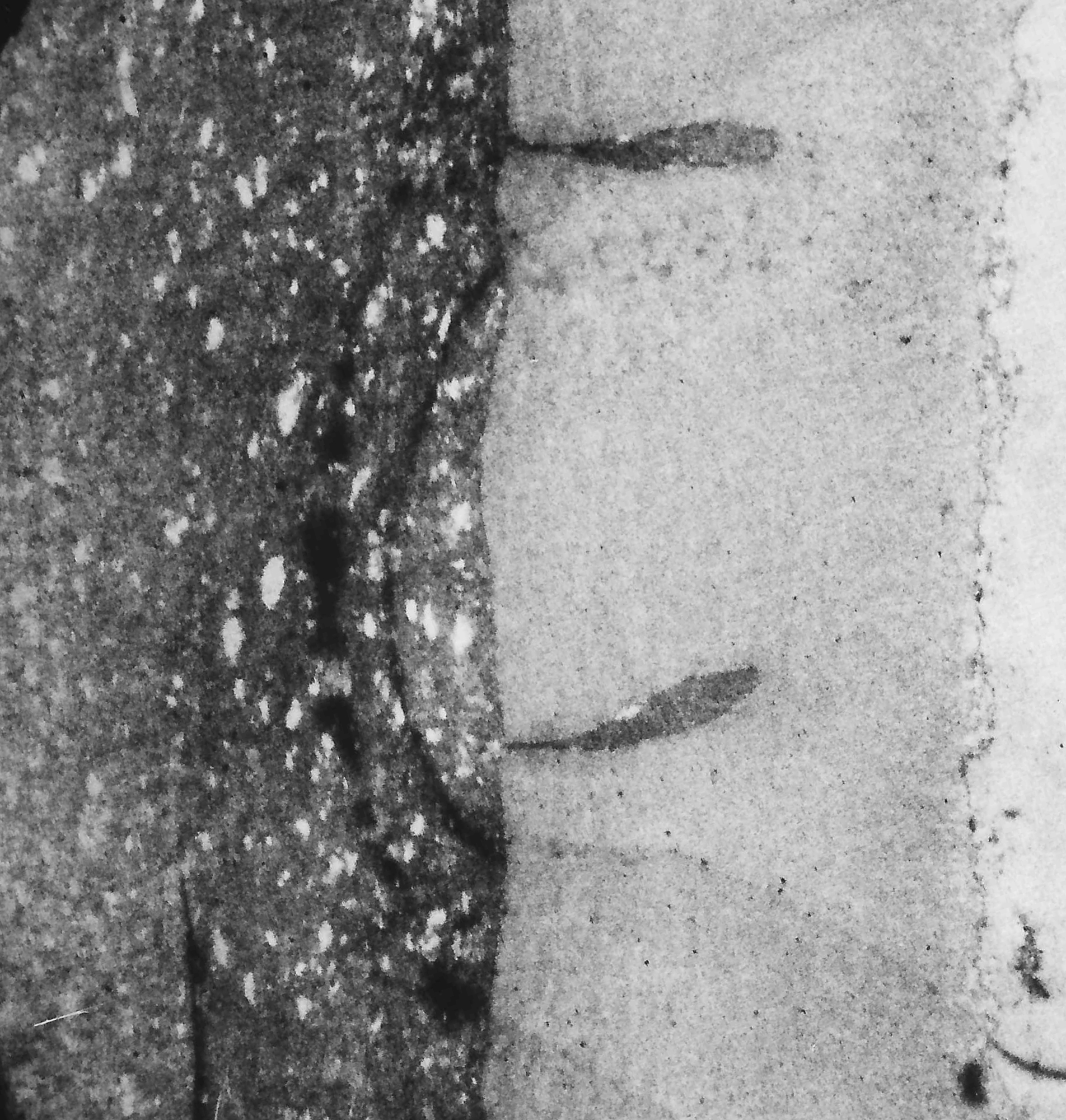
A thin section showing two feet penetrating into the lens capsule. The capsule appears just under 10 microns thick in this micrograph though the apparent thickness will vary with the angle of section cut so the actual thickness may be less. Large numbers of small vesicles can also be seen.

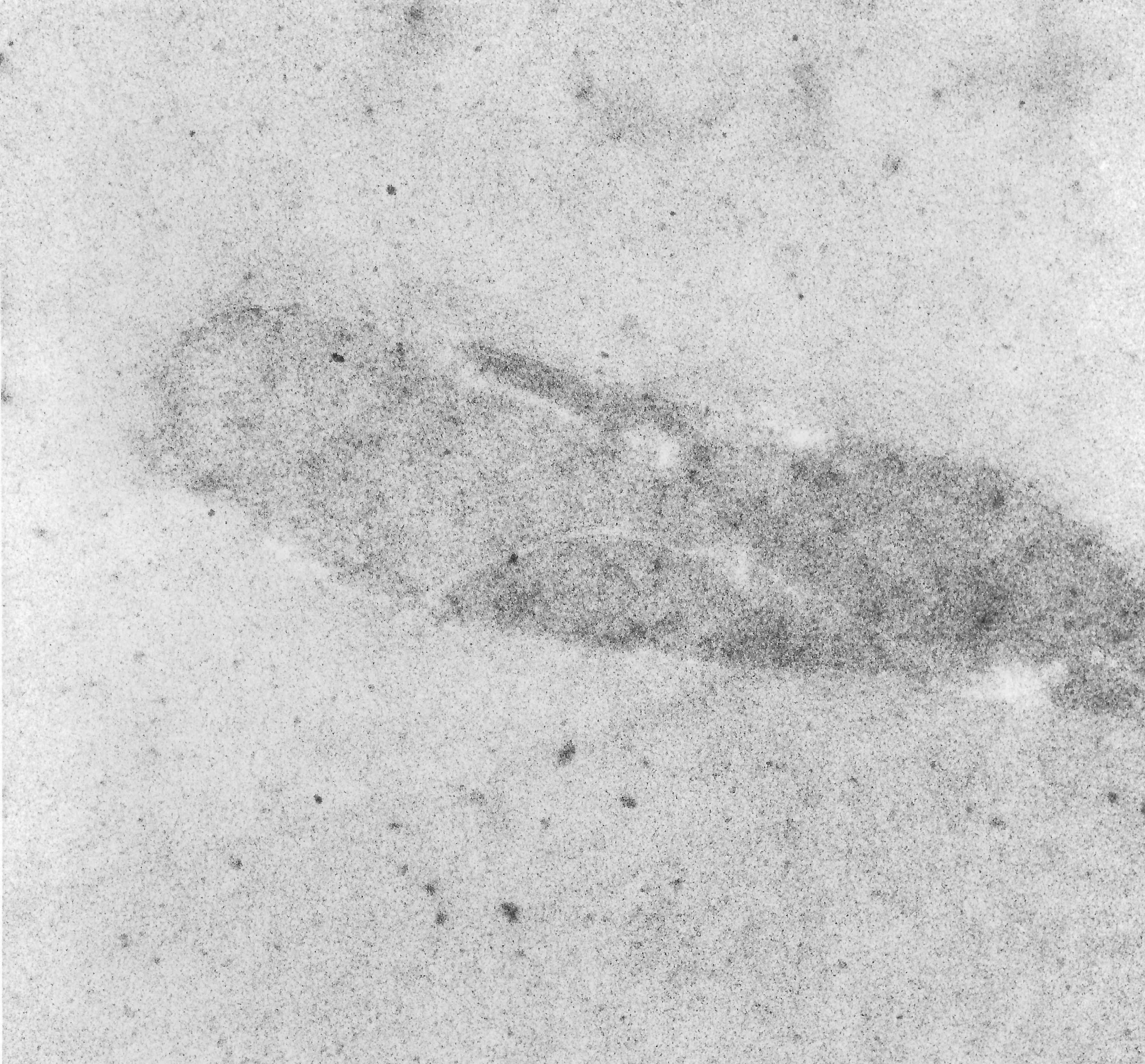
One of the feet and higher magnification. Thin pale fibres can be seen within the cytoplasm.

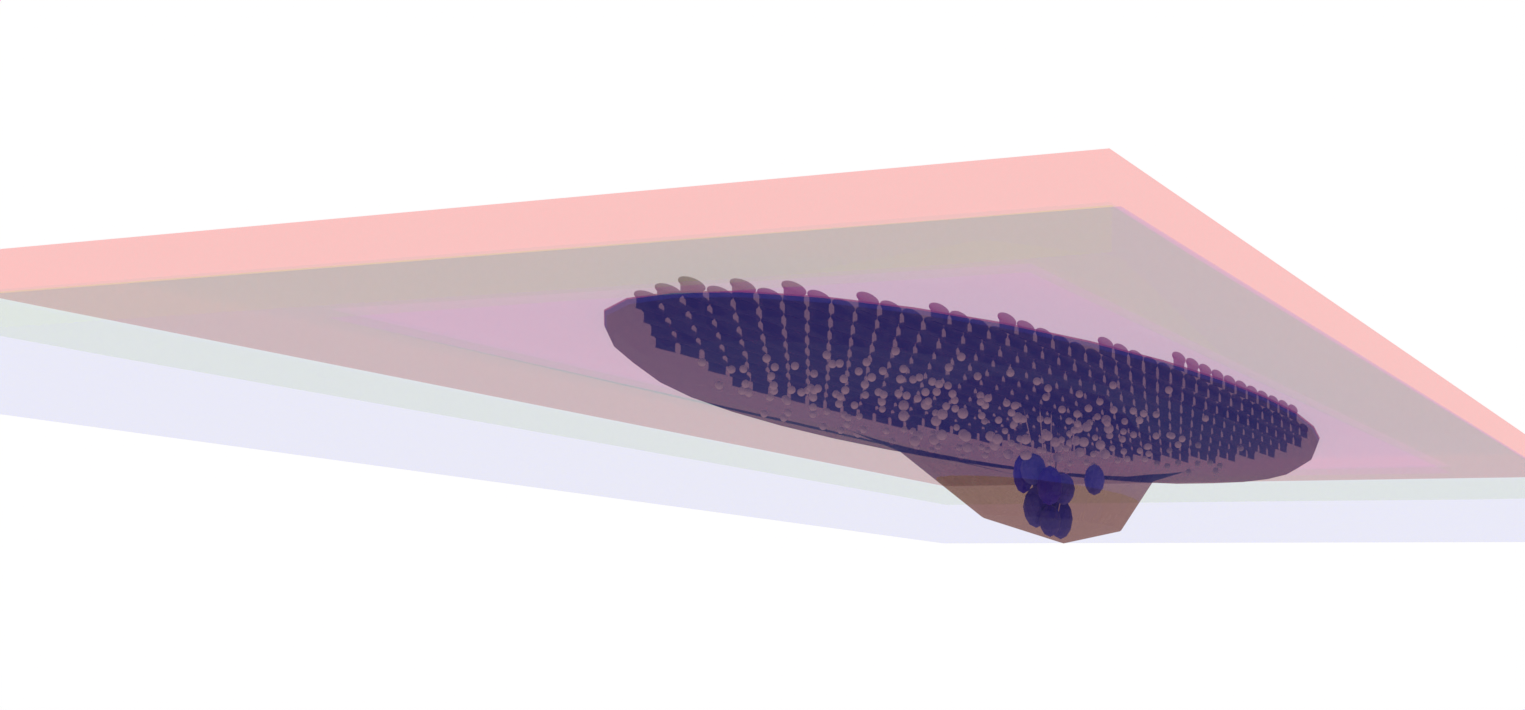
Structure on the outside surface of eye lens capsule at equator showing the fused cells and vesicles associated with it

The structures in the images are consistent with the laying down of new capsular material required for growth. Even though the capsule is a highly elastic structure, it contains no elastic fibers. Elasticity is because of the thick lamellar arrangement of the collagen fibers.

== Function ==
The capsule helps give the lens its more spherical shape in aquatic vertebrates such as fish and more ellipsoidal shape in land based vertebrates such as sheep. In humans the lens ellipsoid becomes more flattened with age. The capsule is the basement membrane for the epithelial cells at the front of the lens and the rapidly growing more flexible fiber cells of the back of the lens and below the epithelium at the front. Without the capsule substrate forming a tense support, these cells lose their form as in the picture of a decapsulated sheep lens.

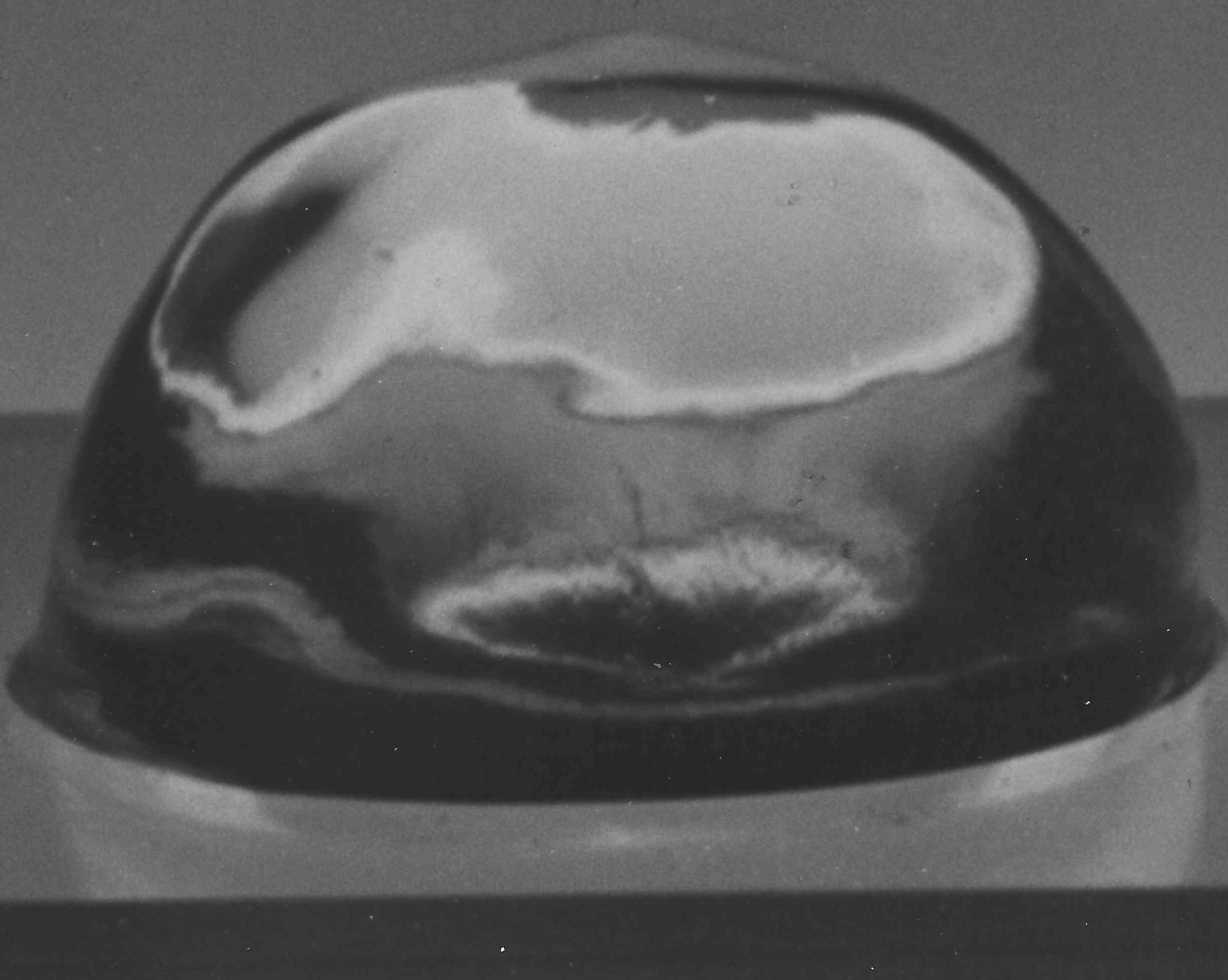
A sheep lens with the capsule stripped off. The classic lens shape is practically lost without the support of the capsule.

=== Accommodation ===
Normally, when ciliary muscles are in a relaxed state, the zonules will pull the capsule. Due to this zonular tension, the anterior lens surface is flatter resulting in more distant objects being in focus. When ciliary muscles contract, the zonular tension will reduce allowing the lens to assume a more spherical shape. This shape change increases the focusing power of the eye allowing closer objects to come into focus. The process of changing the lens's focusing power to see closer objects more clearly is known as accommodation.

== Embryology ==
Lens embryogenesis

The lens vesicle is developed from the surface ectoderm. It separates from the surface ectoderm at approximately day 33 in a human and only 3 days for a chicken. The lens capsule develops from the basal lamina of the lens vesicle and will cover early lens fibers. The capsule is evident at five weeks of human gestation and begins its role in protecting and supporting the lens interior.

=== Lens protection ===
Early embryologic development of the lens capsule gives the lens material an immune privilege. It will also help protect the lens from viruses, bacteria and parasites.

=== Vascular lens capsule ===
During fetal development, the vascular lens capsule (tunica vasculosa lentis) develops from the mesenchyme that surrounds the lens. It receives arterial blood supply from the hyaloid artery. This blood supply slowly regresses and the vascular capsule disappears before birth. The disappearance of the anterior vascular capsule of the lens is useful in estimating the gestational age. While the vascularization disappears during gestation, the micrographs in this article show cells still active on the lens exterior after vascular regression. These cells may be the avascular portion of the original mesenchyme that surrounded the lens.

== Clinical significance ==
In intra-capsular cataract extraction (ICCE), the whole lens including the anterior part of the capsule is removed. During more common extra capsular cataract surgery procedures like micro incision cataract surgery, phacoemulsification etc., the clouded lens is removed through an opening made in the anterior lens capsule. The intraocular lens is then inserted into the lens capsule which is capable of rapid healing. The best place for intraocular lens implantation is within the capsular bag.

Posterior capsular opacification and posterior capsule rupture are common complications of cataract surgery.

== See also ==
- Lens (vertebrate anatomy)
