= Cataract =

Clouding of the lens inside the eye, causing poor vision

- Magnified view of a cataract seen on examination with a slit lamp
- Specialty: Ophthalmology, Optometry
- Symptoms: Blurry vision, difficulties with night vision, sensitivity to light, decreased contrast and color vision, visual distortions (halos)
- Complications: Falling, depression, blindness
- Usual onset: Gradual
- Causes: Aging, trauma, radiation exposure, genetic
- Risk factors: Diabetes, smoking tobacco, prolonged exposure to sunlight, alcohol
- Diagnostic method: Eye examination
- Treatment: Glasses, cataract surgery
- Frequency: 17.2% across all ages

A cataract is a cloudy area in the lens of the eye that impairs vision. How fast a cataract develops depends on the type and one or both eyes may be affected by the condition. Symptoms may include faded colors, blurry or double vision, halos around light, trouble with bright lights, and difficulty seeing at night. This may result in difficulty driving, loss of independence, and decreased ability to perform everyday tasks. Poor vision caused by cataracts may also result in an increased risk of falling and depression.

Cataracts are most commonly due to aging but may also be caused by trauma to the eye, radiation exposure, conditions present from birth or complications from other conditions. Risk factors include diabetes, longstanding use of corticosteroid medication, obesity, other eye conditions, dietary deficiencies, smoking tobacco, prolonged exposure to sunlight and alcohol use. Cataract formation is primarily driven by oxidative stress and aging. Over time, the systems within the eye that keep the lens clear do not work as well, leading to the lens clouding. Diagnosis is typically made through an eye examination, including testing vision at various distances, slitlamp microscopy, and retinal examination. Slit-lamp examination provides further details on the characteristics, location, and extent of the cataract. An ophthalmoscope or a slit lamp with special lenses can be used to evaluate the retina. Sometimes the eye will be dilated before examination to give a better view of the retina. There are many types of cataracts, differentiated by where in the lens the clouding occurs. The three most common types of cataracts are nuclear, which affect the center of the lens, cortical which affect the outer part of the lens, and posterior subcapsular which develop at the back of the lens.

As of 2025, there is no proven way to prevent or delay the development of age-related cataracts. However, risk factors such as alcohol use, smoking, and ultraviolet exposure can be controlled. Early on, the symptoms may be improved with glasses. If this does not help, surgery to remove the cloudy lens and replace it with an artificial lens is the only effective treatment. Cataract surgery is not readily available in many countries, and surgery is needed only if the cataracts are causing problems and generally results in an improved quality of life.

As of 2020, around 12 to 15 million people worldwide are blind due to cataracts and over 200 million have some level of visual impairments due to the condition. Cataracts remain the single most common cause of blindness. The prevalence of cataracts across all ages is 17.2%, with the most common types being nuclear and cortical cataracts. Cataracts become more common with age and are more common in women. Most individuals with cataracts live in lower income countries, with South Asia having the highest rates of cataract induced blindness. Access to cataract surgery varies around the world and those in low- and middle-income countries have lower rates of surgical treatments. In these regions cataracts are responsible for up to 50% of blindness, compared with only about 5% in high-income countries.

== Signs and symptoms ==
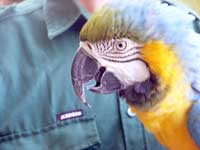
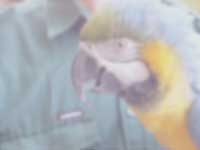
An example of normal vision (left) versus vision with cataracts (right)

The signs and symptoms of cataracts differ according to which part of the lens is affected and the characteristics of how the lens in affected. If there is only mild clouding of the lens (lens opacity), cataracts may not have any symptoms.

As the condition worsens, symptoms begin to develop. Symptoms of cataracts include blurry vision, nearsightedness, astigmatism, difficulties with night vision, sensitivity to light, double vision in one eye, decreased contrast and color vision, visual distortions (halos) or loss of part of the visual field.

As visual impairments worsen, cataracts can affect a persons ability to carry out everyday tasks. Reduced functioning may also lead to mental health difficulties, reduced social functioning, and reduced life expectancy. Vision loss is also associated with reduced physical activity and independence. Impairments in vision increase the risk of falls which can be associated with injuries. A persons ability to drive can also be impacted by vision loss.

== Causes ==
A cataract is a clouding of the eye's natural lens that can be present at birth (congenital) or develop later in life (degenerative). It can affect one or both eyes and occurs because of pathophysiological changes in the lens. Although cataracts are most commonly caused by aging, they can also result from inherited genetic conditions, environmental factors, certain diseases, or the use of some medications.

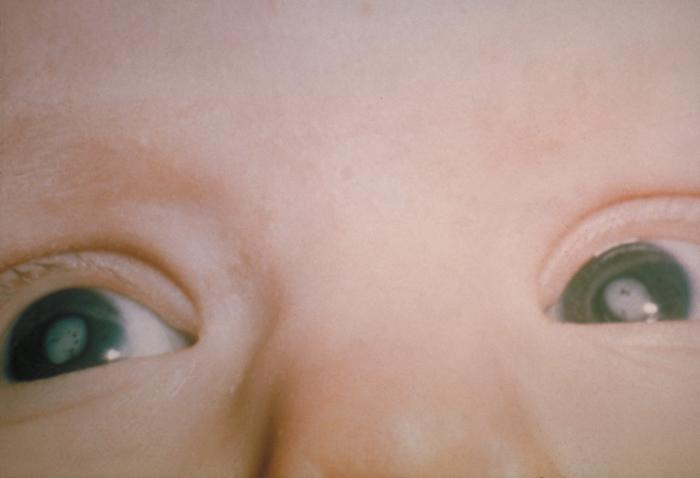
Cataracts in both eyes of an infant due to congenital rubella syndrome

Risk factors for developing cataracts include the following:

- Age: aging is the main risk factor for the development of cataracts
- Genetics: those with relatives who have cataracts, as well as individuals with specific genetic conditions are more likely to develop cataracts
- Ultraviolet (UV) radiation: longterm UV exposure from the sun can damage lens proteins leading to a higher risk of cataracts
- Smoking: toxins from cigarette smoke cause damage to the lens leading to an increased risk of cataracts
- Alcohol use: chronic alcohol use contributes to lens damage and has been associated with heightened cataract risk
- Diabetes: high blood sugar levels may lead to sorbitol building up in the lens leading to an increased risk of developing cataracts
- High blood pressure: associated with heightened risk of cataracts
- Obesity: metabolic and vascular complications of obesity puts an individual at a higher risk for cataracts
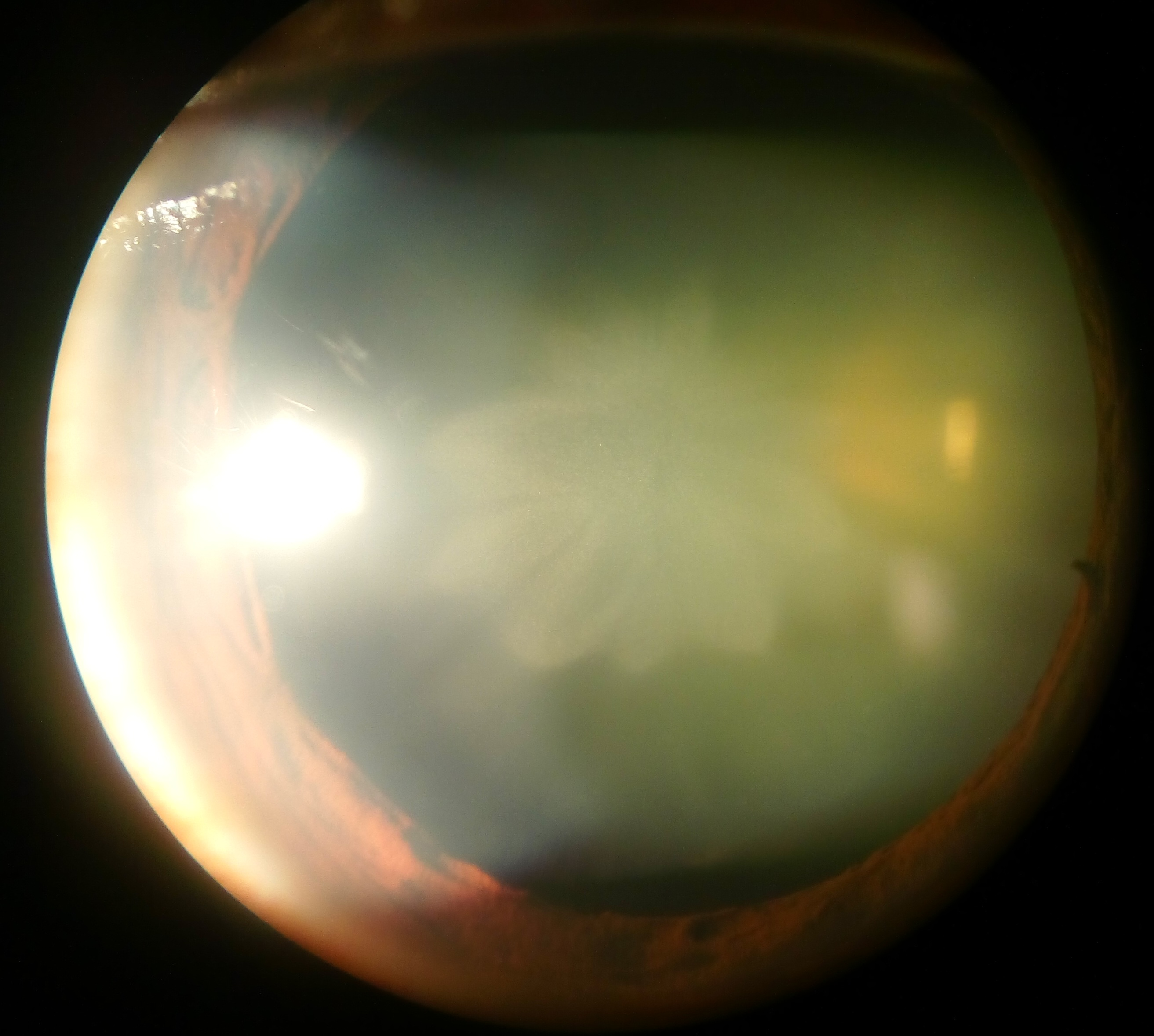
- Post-traumatic cataract in a 60-year-old male
  Medications: chronic corticosteroid usage along with phenothiazine, antidepressants, miotics, and statins can increase the risk of cataracts
- Diseases: cataracts can develop as a result of other eye disorders such as chronic anterior uveitis, pseudoexfoliation syndrome, acute congestive angle-closure glaucoma, severe nearsightedness (high myopia) and some inherited disorders (Marfan syndrome, Down syndrome, myotonic dystrophy, Alport syndrome, retinitis pigmentosa, late-onset retinal dystrophy, or neurofibromatosis type 2)
- Eye injuries: injuries to the eye can cause cataracts directly after the trauma or years later
- Radiation: exposure to ionizing radiation damages the lens cells, raising the risk of developing cataracts
- Diet: deficiencies of antioxidants, minerals, and vitamins C and E can increase the risk of cataracts
- Gender: women have a slightly more elevated risk of cataracts than men
- Ethnicity: some ethnic populations have a higher prevalence of cataracts
- Pollution: environmental pollutants can heighten cataract risk
- Lifestyle: excessive exposure to heat and using certain electronics without eye protection can increase risk of cataracts

== Mechanism ==
Many factors contribute to the formation of cataracts, but aging and oxidative stress are the most common. The eye's lens is mostly made of water and proteins called crystallins. The lens stays clear by using nutrients and antioxidants supplied by the fluid in the front of the eye (aqueous humour). As people age, the systems that transport these nutrients and protect the lens become less effective. The lens also produces fewer crystallin proteins, which normally help keep it clear. As a result, damaged proteins begin to clump together, while oxidation causes proteins to fold incorrectly and lose their normal function. These changes cause the lens to become cloudy over time.

These changes can happen naturally as the lens ages, but genetic, developmental, or environmental factors can speed up the process or make it worse. Anything that disrupts the normal balance of the lens—such as changes in pH, nutrients, water, or mineral levels—can damage the lens further and increase the risk of developing cataracts.

Genetic mutations that affect the proteins in the lens or the genes that control normal lens function can increase the risk of cataracts. In healthy individuals, enzymes break down proteins in a regulated fashion. If these enzymes do not work properly, proteins can be broken down incorrectly and start to clump together. Protein clumps make the lens cloudy, contributing to the development of cataracts.

== Diagnosis ==
Types of cataracts

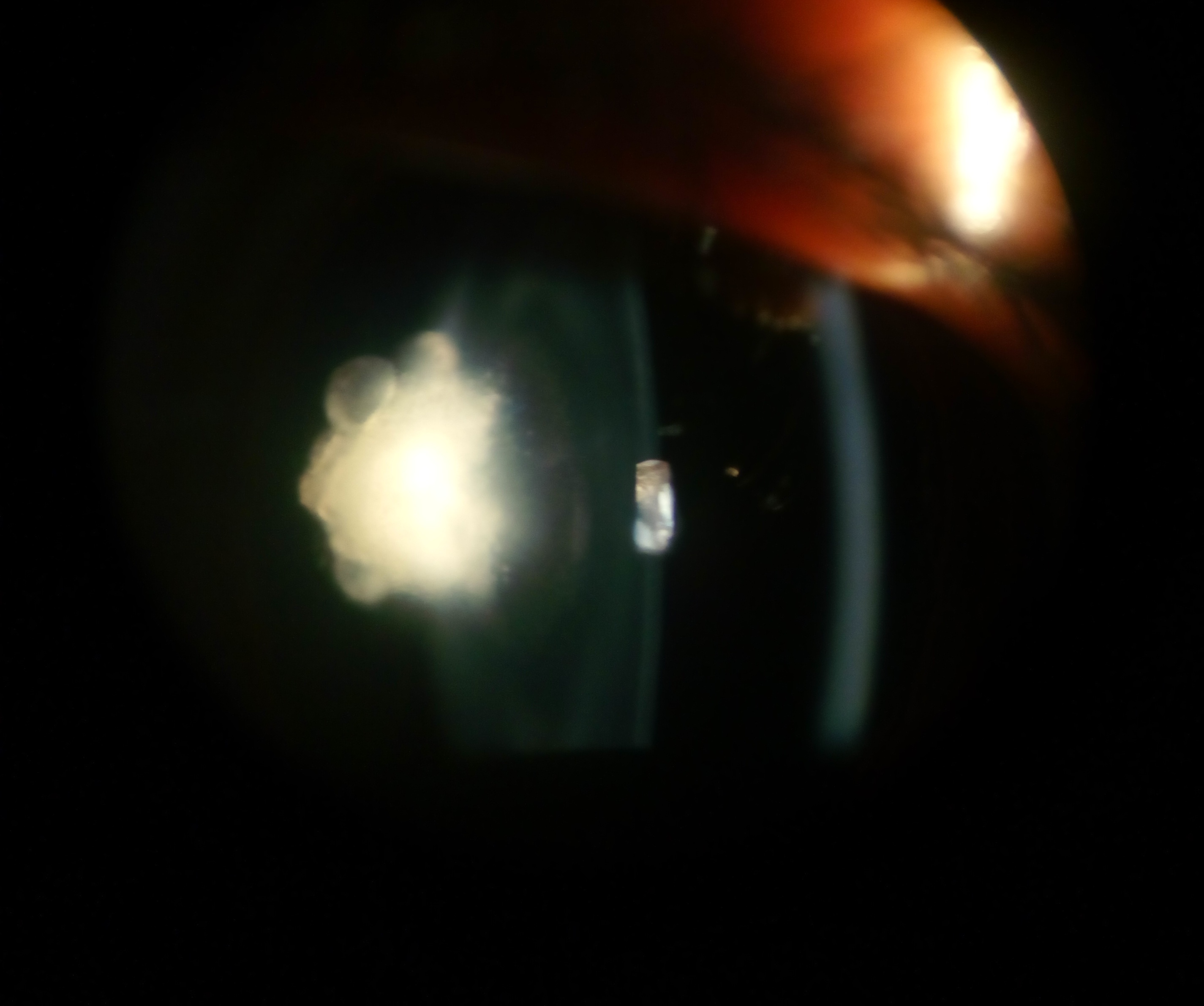
Posterior polar cataract in the left eye of an 8-year-old boy

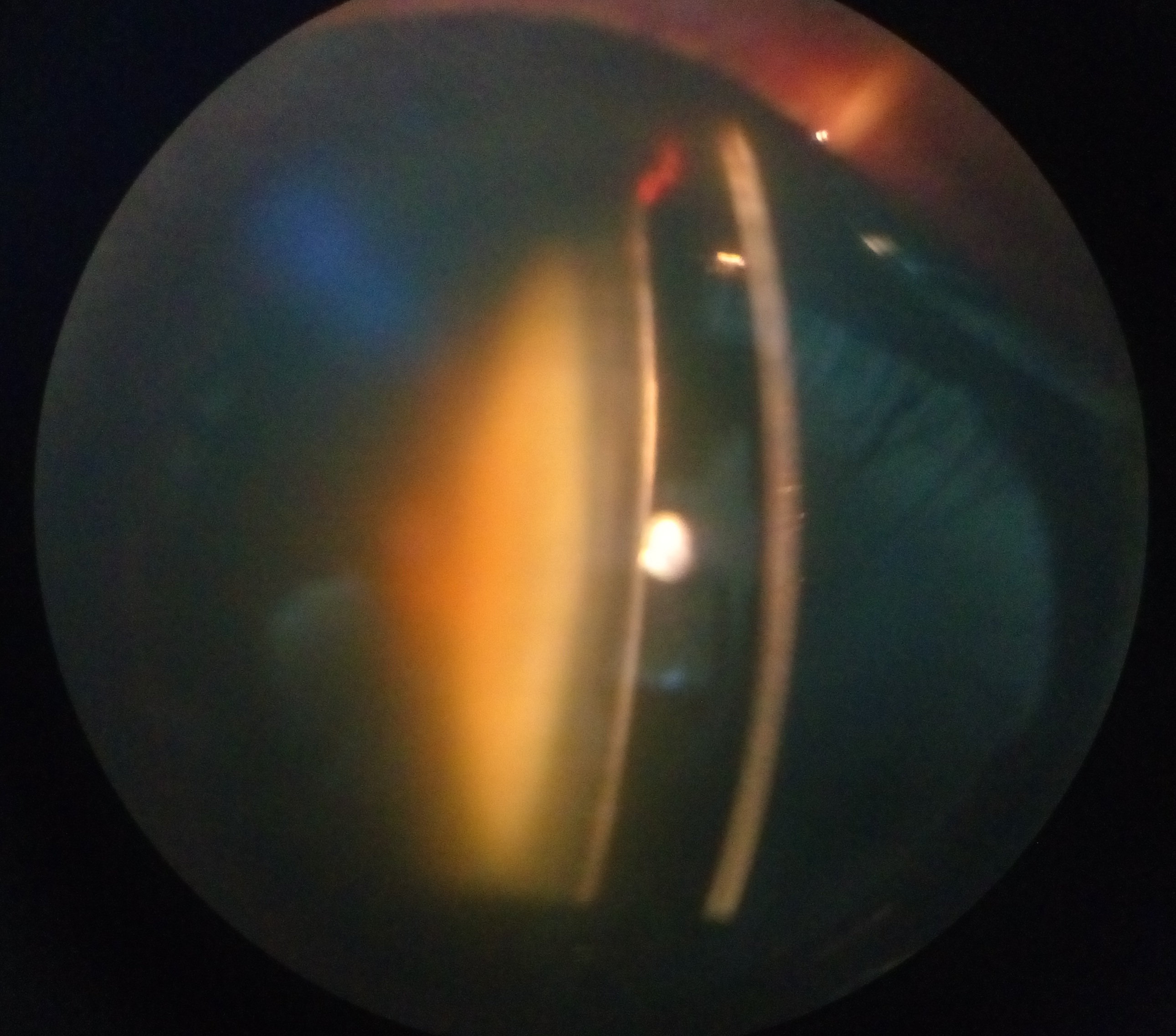
Nuclear cataract in a 70-year-old male

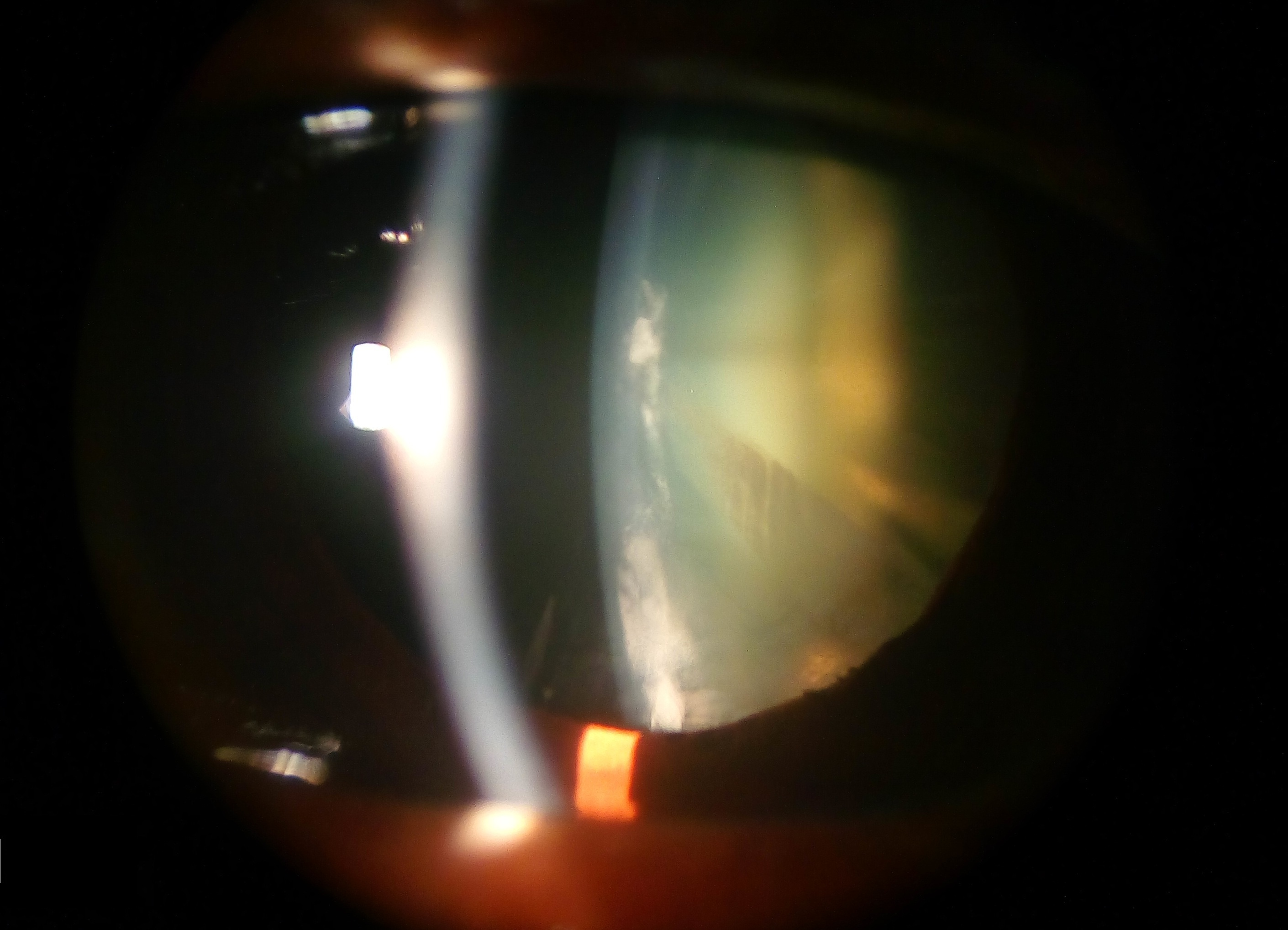
Cortical cataract in a 60-year-old male

The diagnosis of cataracts is made using symptoms reported by the affected individual and eye examinations. Eye examinations are performed by an ophthalmologist or optometrist and consist of testing vision at various distances (visual acuity test), slitlamp microscopy, and retinal examination. A slit-lamp examination allows doctors to view parts of the eye in a magnified, three-dimensional view. Using a thin beam of light, the cornea, iris, lens, and anterior chamber can be examined. This makes it easier to detect clouding or other changes in the lens that may indicate a cataract. A dilated eye examination involves using eye drops to widen (dilate) the pupils, allowing for a better view of the back of the eye (retina). Using an ophthalmoscope or a slit lamp with special lenses, a doctor can examine the retina and other internal eye structures. This exam helps identify any other conditions that may be causing vision problems, in addition to cataracts

=== Classification ===
A cataract is any clouding of the eye's lens. There are three main types, based on where the clouding occurs in the lens. Nuclear cataracts affect the center (nucleus) of the lens. They are often described by their tint, such as opalescent or brunescent, or by how advanced they are, ranging from immature to mature or hypermature. Cortical cataracts affect the outer part (cortex) of the lens. They can appear in different patterns, such as small spots, streaks, spoke-like lines, circular areas, or fluid-filled cracks (waterclefts). Posterior subcapsular cataracts develop at the back of the lens, just beneath the lens capsule. They are caused by a buildup of abnormal (fibrotic or spherical) cells and are considered a specific type of cortical cataract.

Cataracts can also be classified by the age in which they are developed or the cause. Age-based classification includes congenital cataracts (present at birth), postnatal (developed in the first few years of life), juvenile (under the age of 30), and senile (associated with older age). Congenital cataracts are most commonly caused by hereditary and developmental disorders. Other causes include chromosomal disorders and metabolic conditions.

== Prevention ==
As of 2025, there is no proven way to prevent or delay the development of age-related cataracts. However, risk factors such as alcohol use, smoking, and UV exposure can be controlled. Antioxidant supplementation, dietary supplements, regular physical activity, and a healthy diet have all been proposed to help prevent cataracts, however studies have had mixed results on the benefits of these methods.

== Treatment ==
Cataracts are mainly treated with surgery, however prescription glasses or contacts lenses can be used to help manage early visual impairments.

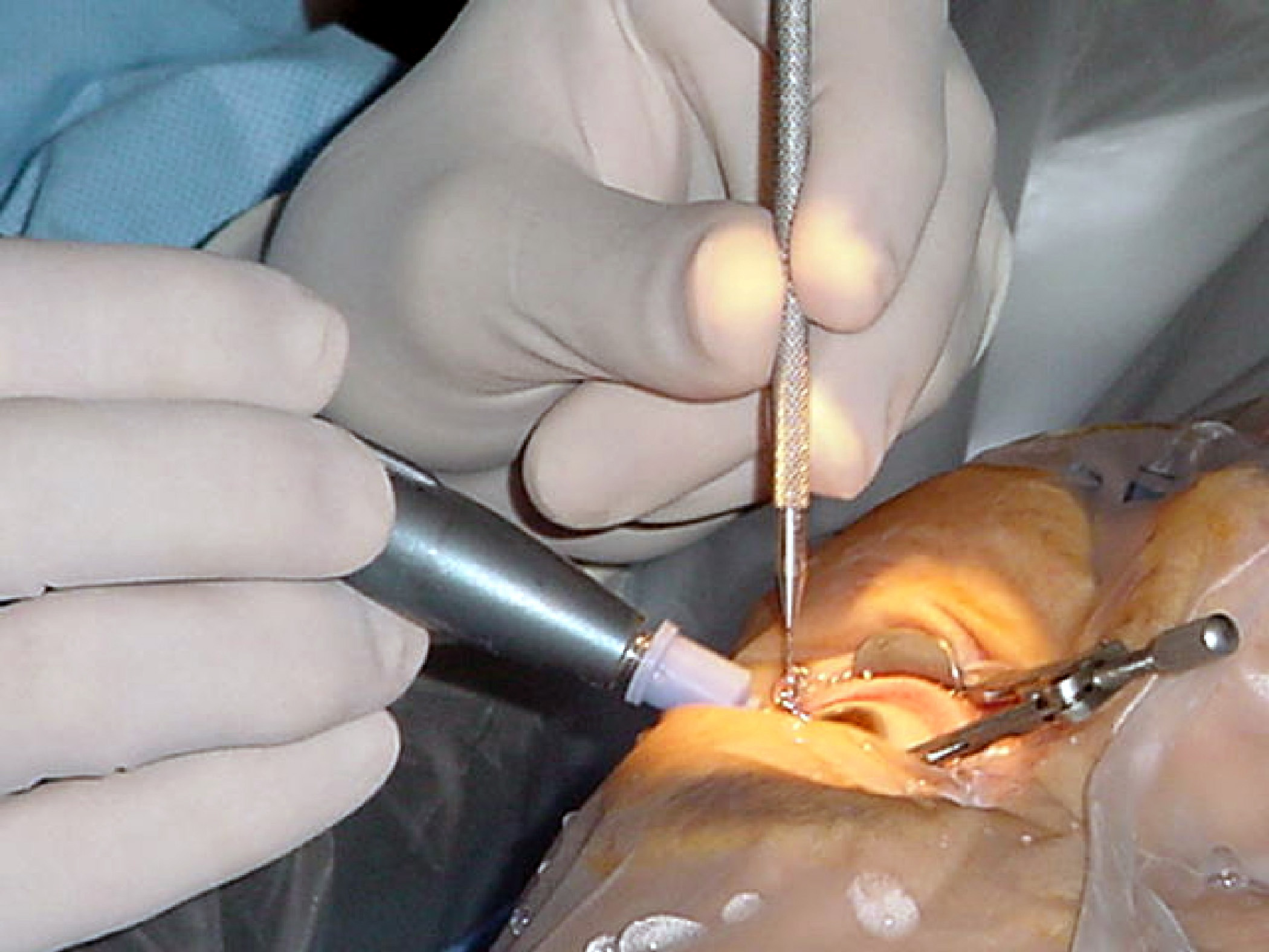
Surgeon inserts an artificial lens following cataract surgery

=== Surgical ===
Cataract surgery is considered an appropriate treatment for individuals whose cataracts have caused visual impairments that limit their ability to carry out daily activities. Other factors that may lead to cataract surgery include correcting a large difference in vision between the two eyes after cataract surgery on the other eye and improving the ability to examine and treat retinal diseases by providing a clearer view of the back of the eye. The risks associated with cataract surgery have declined in recent years, meaning that the threshold for requiring surgery has also decreased.

Measurements of the eyes are taken before surgery to choose the correct artificial lens. Pre-surgery medical testing has shown no reduction in complications during surgery and are therefore not recommended by clinical guidelines. Cataract surgery is usually done with only local anaesthesia and sedation, meaning that the person undergoing surgery is awake during the procedure, however their eye is numbed. General anesthesia may be used for children or adults with intellectual and psychiatric disabilities or those who cannot lie still for long periods of time. The goal of cataract surgery is to provide the individual with the best possible vision and it can improve both nearsighted and farsighted vision.

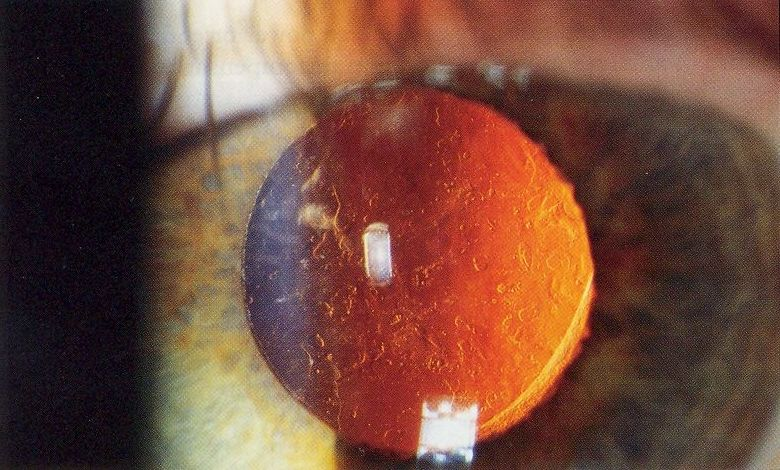
Slit lamp photo of posterior capsular cataract taken a few months after implantation of intraocular lens

Phacoemulsification is the most common and preferred method of cataract surgery. It uses ultrasound waves to break up the cloudy lens, which is then removed from the eye. This procedure is usually performed as an outpatient surgery, meaning people can go home the same day as their surgery. Compared with manual extracapsular cataract extraction (ECCE) and manual small-incision cataract surgery (MSICS), phacoemulsification generally provides better uncorrected distance vision after surgery and has a lower risk of complications, such as the iris slipping through the incision or tearing of the back lens capsule.

Phacoemulsification begins by making a small incision in the cornea and filling the front of the eye with a gel to protect its structures. A small circular opening is then made in the front of the lens capsule to access the cataract. A handheld ultrasound probe breaks the cloudy lens into small pieces (phacoemulsification). These pieces are then gently suctioned out while keeping the lens capsule and its supporting fibers (zonules) intact. After the cataract is removed, a flexible artificial intraocular lens (IOL) is inserted through the small incision. The lens unfolds inside the remaining lens capsule, where it is held securely in the same position as the natural lens. Finally, the small corneal incisions are sealed with water, and stitches are usually not needed.

Small incision cataract surgery (SICS) is another common method of cataract removal. Unlike phacoemulsification, it uses a slightly larger incision in the white part of the eye (sclera) so the cloudy lens can be removed in one piece instead of being broken up with ultrasound. The remaining steps, including removing the leftover lens material and inserting an artificial intraocular lens, are similar to phacoemulsification. SICS is used more in low- and middle-income countries because it is faster, requires less specialized equipment, and is less expensive.

== Outlook ==
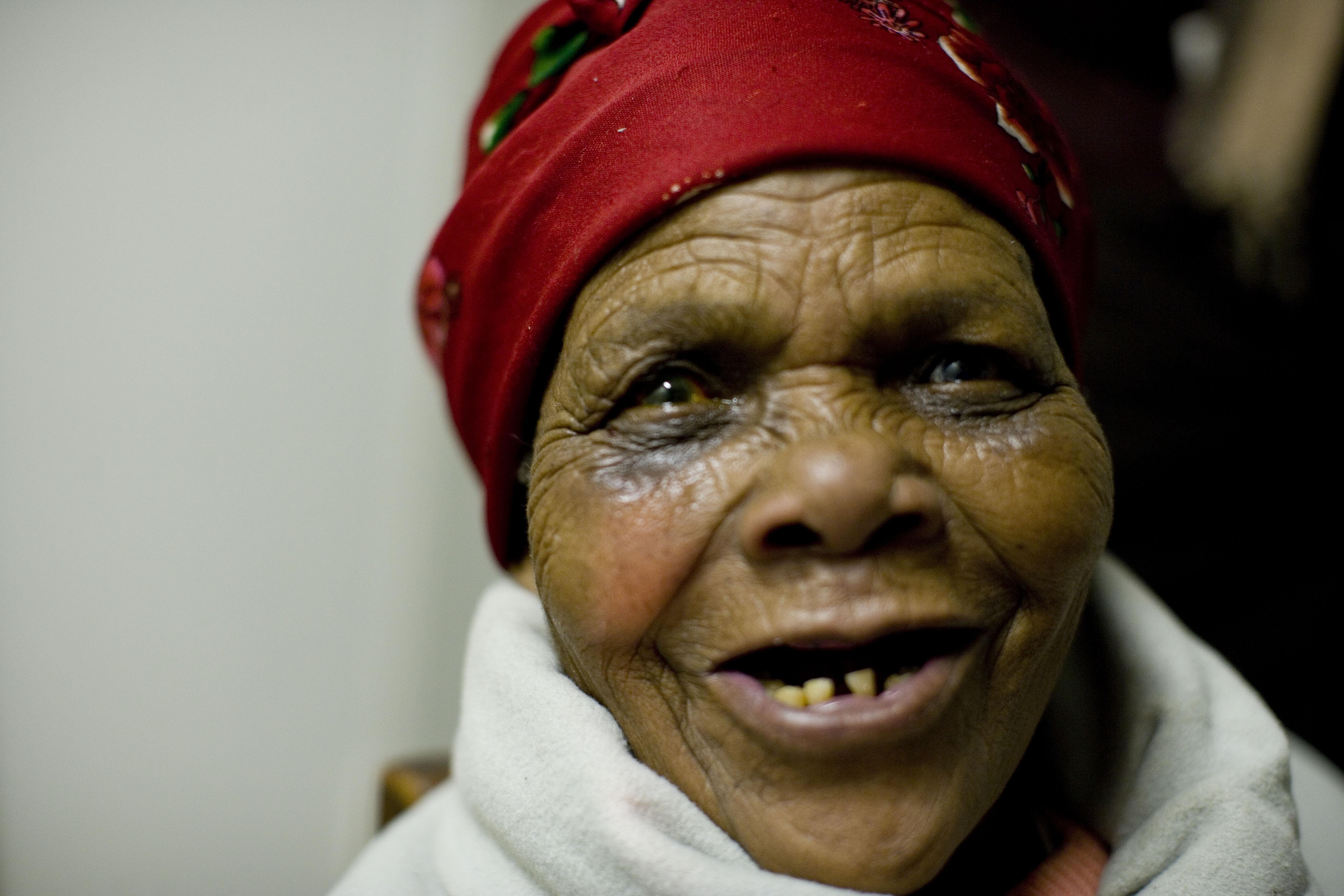
A South African woman experiences newfound eyesight after a patch was removed after surgery to remove an eye cataract.

Cataracts usually worsen with time, however the type of cataract, severity and how fast they progress varies by individual. When cataracts progress to the point of visual impairment, the only way of regaining vision is surgical treatment. If there is no complication during or after cataract surgery, vision starts to improve within one to five days following surgery.

The outcomes and individuals' level of satisfaction with cataract surgery are good. A European study of cataract surgery outcomes performed in 2013, concluded that around 94% of those who have undergone surgery achieved a corrected distance visual acuity (CDVA) of 20/40 or better; 61.3% had a CDVA of 20/20 or better. Other studies have shown that 82-95% of those who had surgery achieved a CDVA of 20/40 or better.

Serious complications during cataract surgery are uncommon. One of the main complications is a tear in the back of the lens capsule, which occurs in about 1–5% of surgeries and may allow the vitreous liquid inside the eye to move forward (vitreous prolapse). This can make it impossible to implant certain types of advanced artificial lenses and increases the risk of complications such as eye infection (endophthalmitis), swelling of the central retina (macular edema), and retinal detachment.

The most common complication after cataract surgery is temporary macular edema, which causes blurred vision for several weeks or months. In most cases, the swelling improves on its own, but anti-inflammatory eye drops, including steroid and nonsteroidal anti-inflammatory (NSAID) drops, can help speed recovery. Secondary cataracts can also develop after surgery.

== Epidemiology ==
Cataracts are the most common cause of blindness worldwide. According to a study conducted in 2020, around 12 to 15 million people worldwide are blind due to cataracts and over 200 million have some level of visual impairments due to the condition. The prevalence of cataracts across all ages is 17.2%, with the most common types being nuclear and cortical cataracts. The chances of a person developing cataracts increases with age; in those over sixty years old, the prevalence of cataracts is over 54%. Women, and those living in areas that are low income are at a higher risk for developing cataracts.

== History ==
"Cataract" comes from Latin word cataracta, meaning "waterfall" or a heavy door, which was borrowed from the Ancient Greek καταρράκτης (katarrhaktēs), meaning "waterfall". The Greek term is made up of kata, meaning "down," and rheō, meaning "to flow," which translates to "flowing down". According to Greek philosopher Celsus, at the time, people believed a cataract was caused by thickened fluid that flowed from the brain and collected between the cornea and the iris, blocking vision. In Latin, cataracta had the alternative meaning "portcullis" and the name possibly passed through French to form the English meaning "eye disease" (early 15th century), on the notion of "obstruction".

According to historians, it is not possible to say which region or who first performed cataract surgery. It is however believed that cataract surgery did start in one area and spread, based on the similarities between descriptions of cataract surgery throughout the world. Cataract surgery is thought to have originated as early as 800 BC, with the method of "couching". Couching was an early form of cataract treatment in which a sharp instrument was used to push the cloudy lens out of its normal position and into the back of the eye (the vitreous cavity), allowing light to reach the retina.

Throughout history, different regions have had different beliefs regarding the mechanisms behind cataracts. Greco-Roman writings compared the clouding of the lens to tinted glass and incorporated glassy (vitreous) humor into their fundamental humors. Early Indian medicine believed that cataracts were cause by imbalanced states in a person. Both Greco-Roman and Indian writings believed that cataracts were caused by a pathologic humor that had collected in the eyes. Greeks referred to cataracts as hypochyma and the Romans called them suffusio (suffusion).

== Society and culture ==
Most people with cataracts live in low- and middle-income countries, where cataracts remain a major cause of vision loss and blindness. In these settings, cataract-related vision problems are both a cause and a result of poverty. South Asia has the highest rates of cataract-related blindness and moderate to severe vision impairment in the world. However, between 2000 and 2020, cataract blindness decreased substantially in several regions, including South Asia, Southeast Asia, East Asia, and Oceania, and North Africa and the Middle East.

In the United States, minorities such as Asian, Black, Hispanic, and Indigenous people have higher rates of cataracts. These groups are also more likely to have severe vision impairments by the time they access surgical care.

Access to cataract surgery varies greatly around the world. In low- and middle-income countries (LMICs), limited resources and a shortage of surgeons mean that cataracts are responsible for up to 50% of blindness, compared with only about 5% in high-income countries. The number of cataract surgeries performed each year also differs widely. High-income countries usually perform 4,000–6,000 cataract surgeries per million people each year. In Latin America and areas in Asia, the rate is about 500–2,000 per million, while in Africa, China, and the poorest countries in Asia, it is around 500 or fewer per million.

== Research directions ==
Researchers are studying medications that could slow down or reverse cataract formation. The most promising treatments focus on reducing oxidative stress or preventing the buildup of damaged crystallin proteins in the lens. For example, antioxidants such as N-acetylcarnosine may help protect the lens by increasing glutathione activity, which reduces oxidative damage and may slow cataract progression. Another potential treatment, lanosterol, has been shown in animal studies to break apart clumps of proteins in the lens and reduce clouding. However, no drug treatment for cataracts has yet been proven effective in humans or progressed to human clinical trials.

== See also ==
- Galactosemic cataract – Clouding of the eye's lens due to excess galactose in the blood
- Intraoperative floppy iris syndrome
