= Lens placode =

Thickened portion of ectoderm which serves as the precursor to the lens

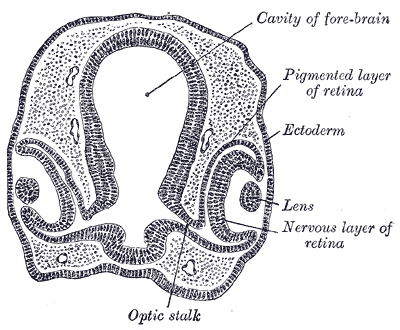
- Transverse section of head of chick embryo of fifty-two hours’ incubation.

Details
- Precursor: Surface ectoderm
- Gives rise to: Lens

Identifiers
- Latin: placoda lentis
- TE: placode_by_E5.16.3.1.0.0.13 E5.16.3.1.0.0.13

The lens placode is a thickened portion of ectoderm that serves as the precursor to the lens.

== Invagination ==
Invagination is the process of folding in cells. The lens placode invaginates to later develop the lens or lens pit. The development of the lens placode is typically seen between 44 and 50 hours; invagination occurs shortly after at around the 50–55-hour mark. (Mouse)

Both the formation of the lens placode, and the invagination of this to the lens pit are both morphogenetic events.

== Cell shape, density, and surface area ==
Chick embryos studies show the lens placode contains a cuboidal to columnar cell shape and that it is not multilayered. Furthermore, the density of the cell appears to double in size once the placode has developed. And while the cell density increases, the surface area is not impacted.

== Restricted expansion hypothesis ==
The restricted expansion hypothesis” states that the adhesion of the ectoderm cells to the matrix is a key factor in the lens placode formation. This adhesion is accompanied by cell proliferation, which also impacts crowding and cell elongation.

== Transcription factors ==
Pax6 is a transcription factor that is essential to the development of the lens placode. More specifically, it is needed for the surface ectoderm to fully develop. Pax6 has been identified as a necessary transcription factor for the thickness of the lens placode.

SOX2 is a transcription factor that works alongside Pax6 to develop the lens placode. They maintain the same protein levels in the ectoderm. Therefore, SOX2 and Pou2f1 are involved in the development of the lens placode.

== See also ==
- Placode
