= Nuclear sclerosis =

Age-related disease of the eye

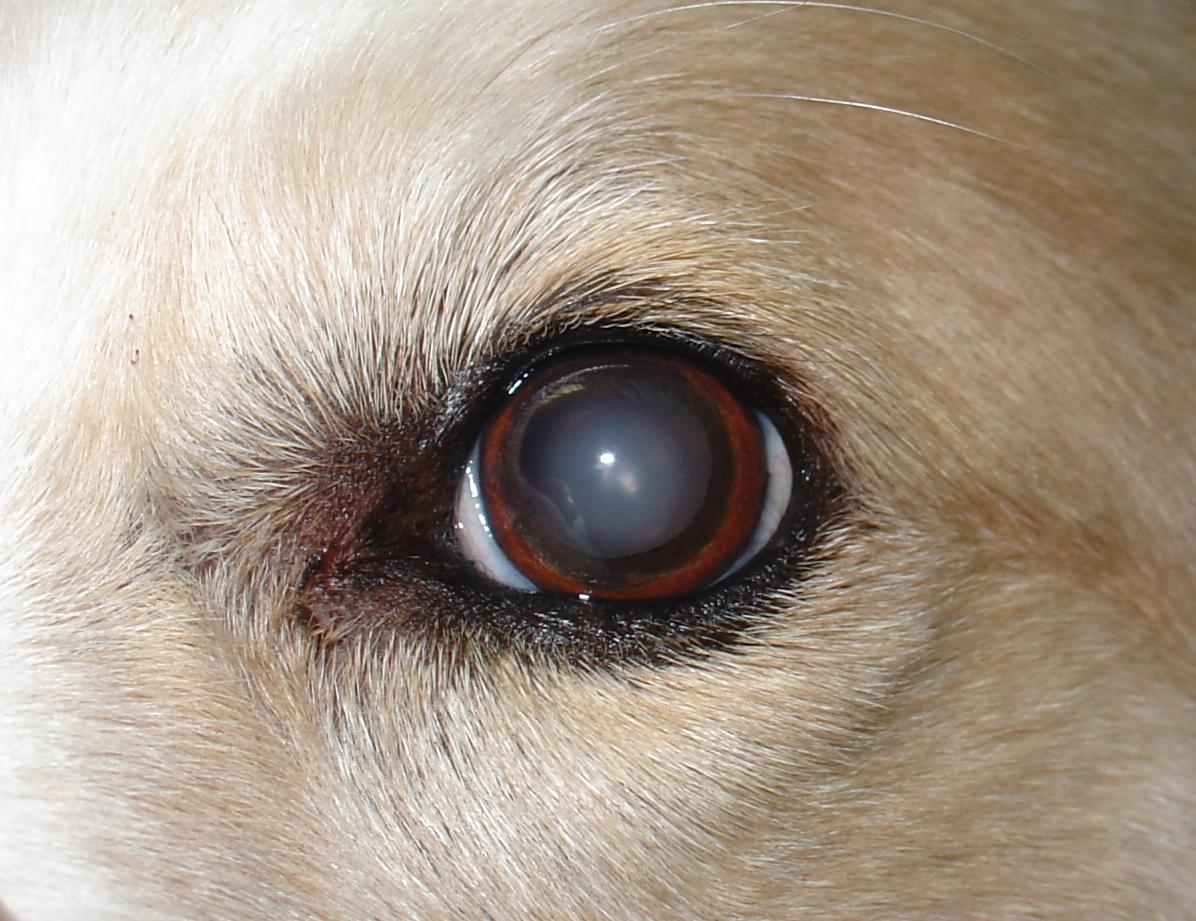
Nuclear sclerosis

Nuclear sclerosis is an age-related change in the density of the crystalline lens nucleus that occurs in all older animals. It is caused by compression of older lens fibers in the nucleus by new fiber formation. The denser construction of the nucleus causes it to scatter light. Although nuclear sclerosis may describe a type of early cataract in human medicine, in veterinary medicine the term is also known as lenticular sclerosis and describes a bluish-grey haziness at the nucleus that usually does not affect vision, except for unusually dense cases. Immature senile cataract has to be differentiated with nuclear sclerosis while making its diagnosis.

== Veterinary medicine ==
In veterinary practice, nuclear sclerosis is a consistent finding in dogs greater than six years old. Nuclear sclerosis appears as a bilateral bluish-grey haziness at the nucleus, or center of the lens, caused by an increase in the refractive index of that part of the lens due to its increased density. It is often confused with other types of cataract. The condition is differentiated from other types of cataract by its clinical appearance, by shining a penlight into the eye (retroillumination). With nuclear sclerosis, a reflection from the tapetum will be seen, while a localized cataract may block reflection and appear as a shadow in the lens. There is no treatment for this condition currently.
