= Lens (vertebrate anatomy) =

Eye structure

- Schematic diagram of the human eye

Details
- Part of: Eye
- System: Visual system
- Function: Refract light

Identifiers
- Latin: lens crystallin
- MeSH: D007908
- TA98: A15.2.05.001
- TA2: 6798
- FMA: 58241

The lens, or crystalline lens, is a transparent biconvex structure in most land vertebrate eyes. While often used even today, the term "crystalline" is very old, dating back more than 1000 years. The lens has not been found have crystallinity in any modern scientific sense of the word. Relatively long, thin fiber cells make up the majority of the lens. These cells vary in architecture and are arranged in concentric layers. New layers of cells are recruited from a thin epithelium at the front of the lens, just below the basement membrane surrounding the lens. As a result, the vertebrate lens grows throughout life. The surrounding lens membrane referred to as the lens capsule also grows in a systematic way, ensuring the lens maintains an optically suitable shape in concert with the underlying fiber cells. Thousands of suspensory ligaments are embedded into the capsule at its largest diameter which suspend the lens within the eye. Most of these lens structures are derived from the epithelium of the embryo before birth.

Along with the cornea, aqueous, and vitreous humours, the lens refracts light, focusing it onto the retina. In many land animals, the shape of the lens can be altered, effectively changing the focal length of the eye, enabling them to focus on objects at various distances. This adjustment of the lens is known as accommodation (see also below). In many fully aquatic vertebrates, such as fish, other methods of accommodation are used, such as changing the lens's position relative to the retina rather than changing the shape of the lens. Accommodation is analogous to the focusing of a photographic camera via changing its lenses. In land vertebrates the lens is flatter on its anterior side than on its posterior side, while in fish the lens is often close to spherical.

Accommodation in humans allows artificial means of supplementing our focus, such as glasses, for correction of sight as we age. The refractive power of a younger human lens in its natural environment is approximately 18 dioptres, roughly one-third of the eye's total power of about 60 dioptres. By age 25 the ability of the lens to alter the light path has reduced to 10 dioptres and accommodation continues to decline with age.

== Structure ==
=== Position in the eye ===
The lens is located towards the front part of the vertebrate eye, called the anterior segment, which includes the cornea and iris positioned in front of the lens. The lens is held in place by the suspensory ligaments (Zonule of Zinn), attaching the lens at its equator to the rest of the eye through the ciliary body. Behind the lens is the jelly-like vitreous body which helps hold the lens in place. At the front of the lens is the liquid aqueous humour which bathes the lens with nutrients and other things. Land vertebrate lenses usually have an ellipsoid, biconvex shape. The front surface is less curved than the back. In a human adult, the lens is typically about 10 mm in diameter and 4 mm thick, though its shape changes with accommodation and its size grows throughout a person's lifetime.

=== Anatomy ===
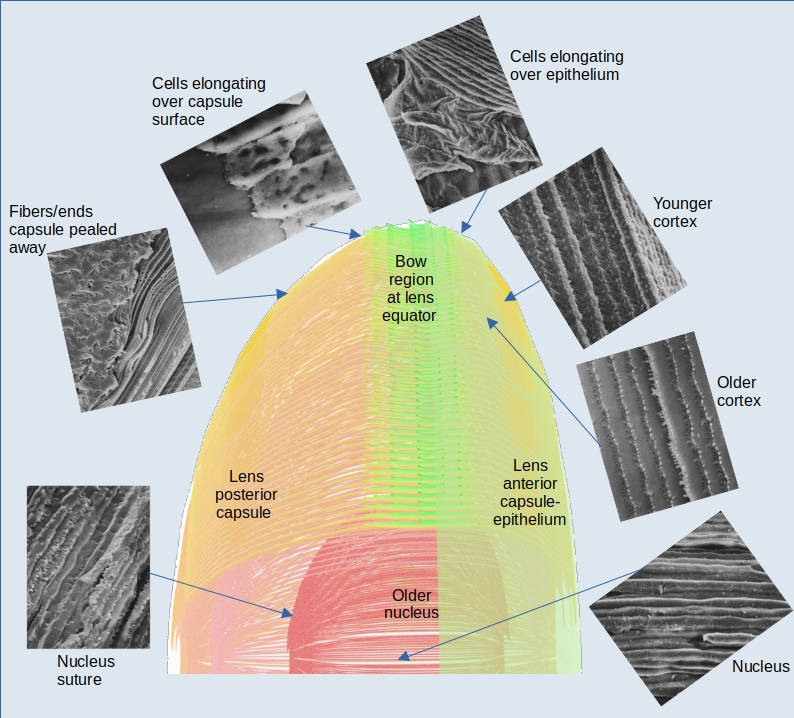
3D lens model from sheep with parts labeled and images of cells from different parts overlaid

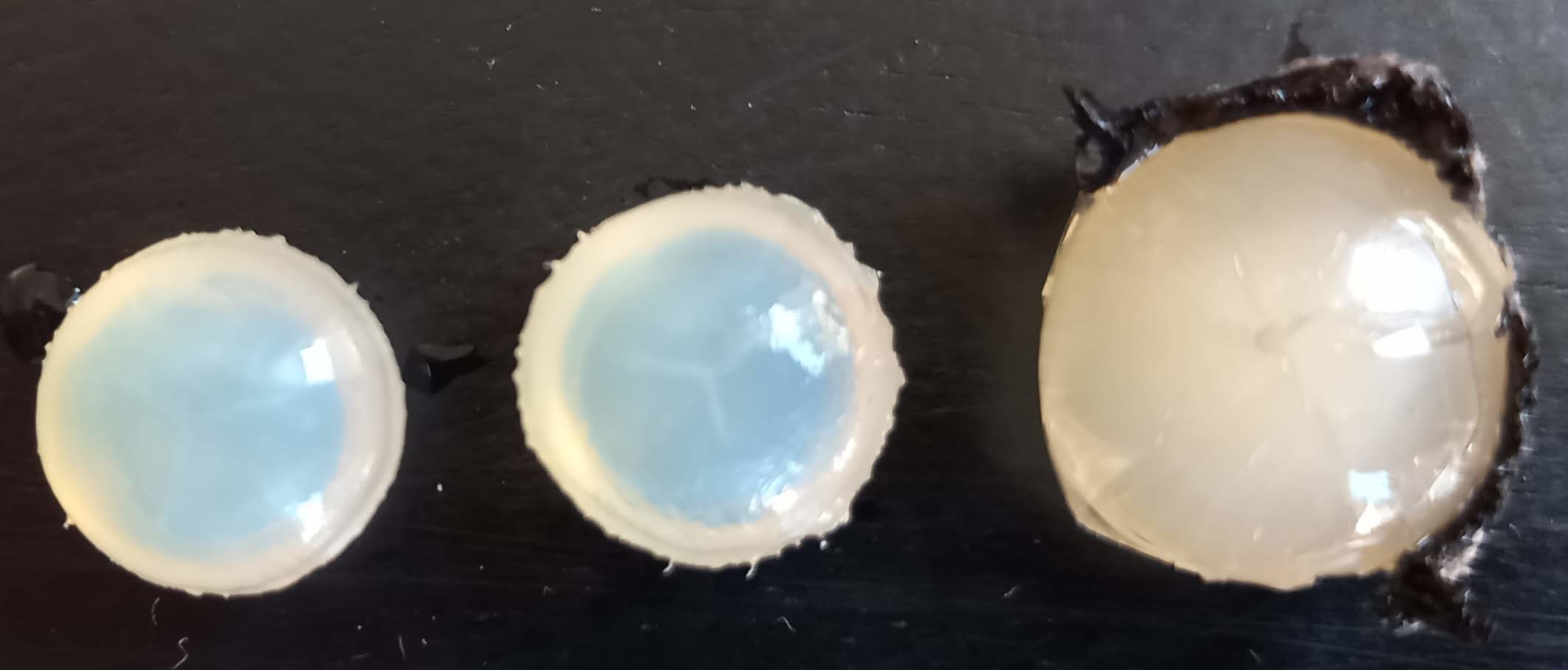
Sheep eye lens para-formaldehyde fixed front view. Small lenses are about 1 cm in diameter. Small bumps at edge are remnants of suspensory ligaments.

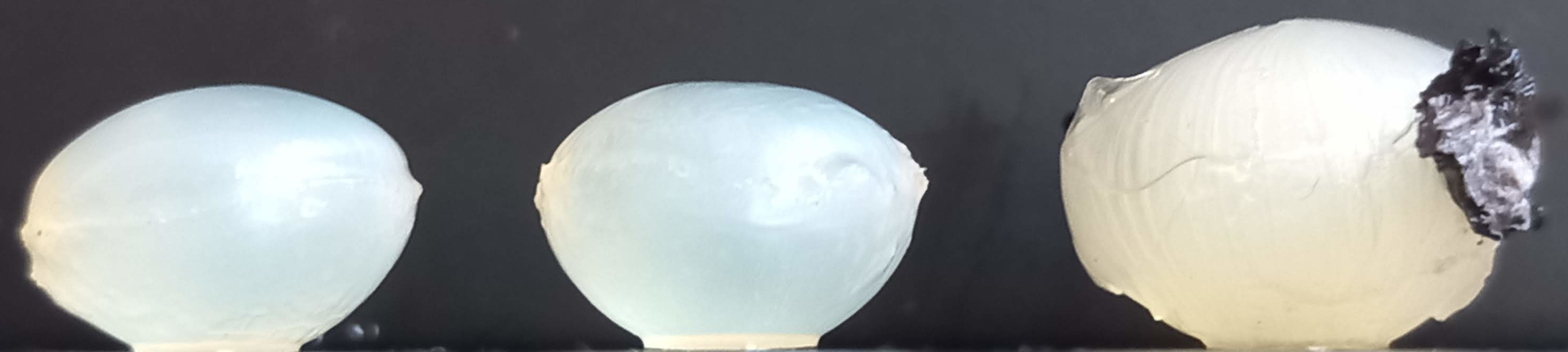
Sheep lens fixed side view. The largest lens has damaged capsule and iris attached.

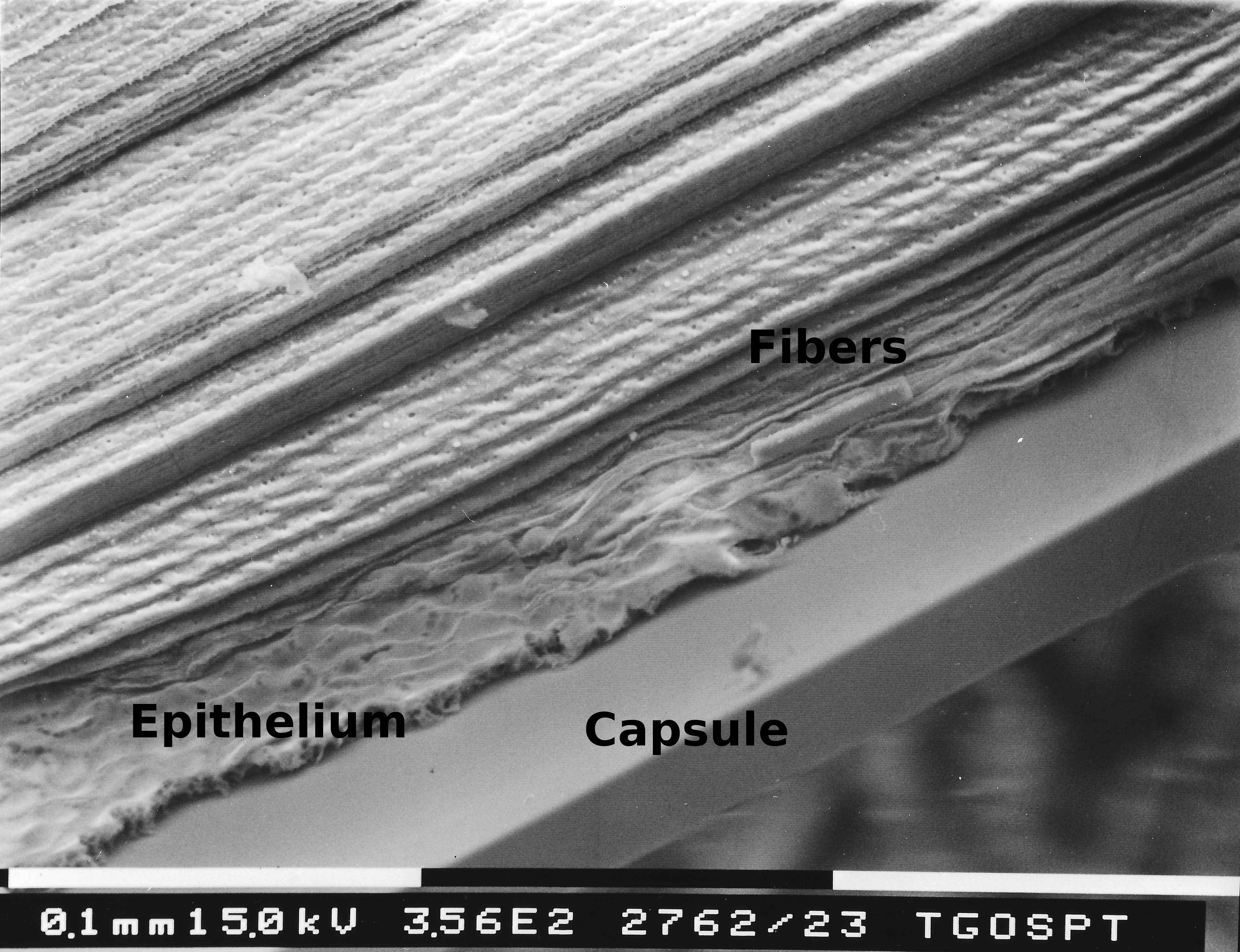
Microscope image of lens cell types and capsule

The lens has three main parts: the lens capsule, the lens epithelium, and the lens fibers. The lens capsule is a relatively thick basement membrane forming the outermost layer of the lens. Inside the capsule, much thinner lens fibers form the bulk of the lens. The cells of the lens epithelium form a thin layer between the lens capsule and the outermost layer of lens fibers at the front of the lens but not the back. The lens itself lacks nerves, blood vessels, or connective tissue. Anatomists will often refer to positions of structures in the lens by describing it like a globe of the world. The front and back of the lens are referred to as the anterior and posterior "poles", like the North and South poles. The "equator" is the outer edge of the lens often hidden by the iris and is the area of most cell differentiation. As the equator is not generally in the light path of the eye, the structures involved with metabolic activity avoid scattering light that would otherwise affect vision.

==== Lens capsule ====
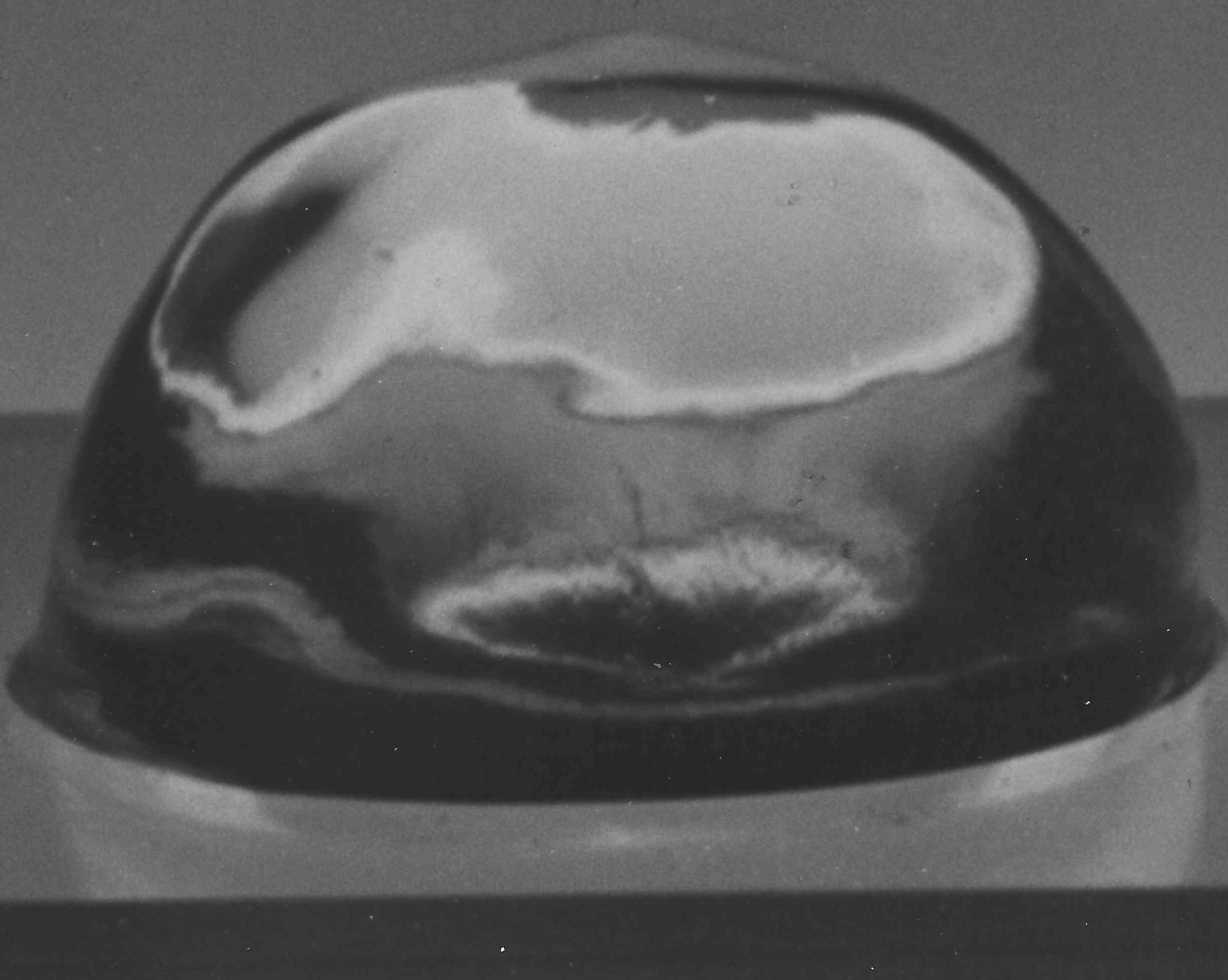
Sheep lens capsule removed. Decapsulation leads to a nearly formless blob.

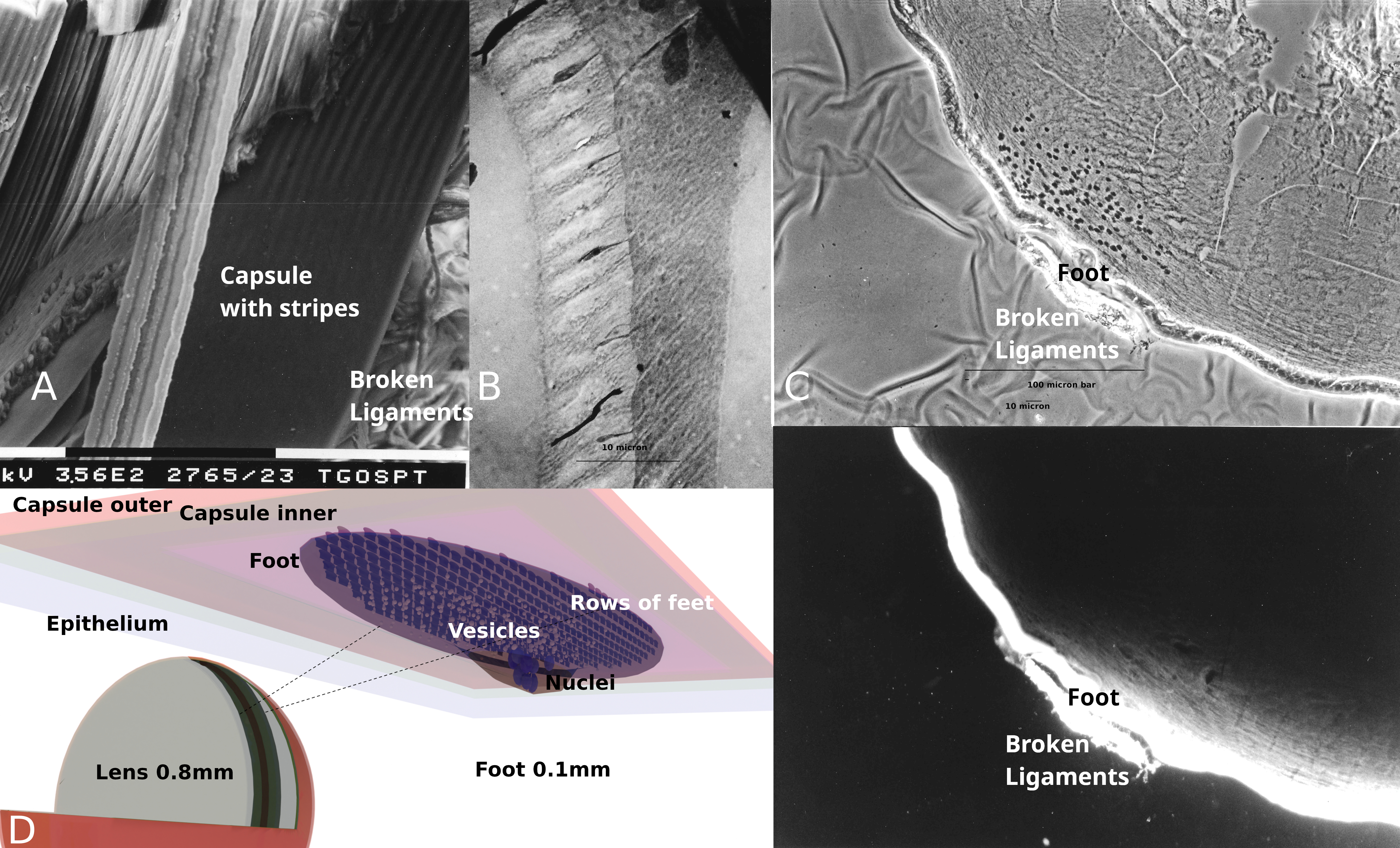
Eye lens micrographs and diagram of growth region of the capsule

The lens capsule is a smooth, transparent basement membrane that completely surrounds the lens. The capsule is elastic and its main structural component is collagen. It is presumed to be synthesized by the lens epithelium and its main components in order of abundance are heparan sulfate proteoglycan (sulfated glycosaminoglycans (GAGs)), entactin, type IV collagen and laminin. The capsule is very elastic and so allows the lens to assume a more spherical shape when the tension of the suspensory ligaments is reduced. The human capsule varies from 2 to 28 micrometres in thickness, being thickest near the equator (peri-equatorial region) and generally thinner near the posterior pole. The photos from electron and light microscopes show an area of the capsule lens equator where the capsule grows and adjacent to where thousands of suspensory ligaments attach. Attachment must be strong enough to stop the ligaments being detached from the lens capsule. Forces are generated from holding the lens in place and the forces added to during focusing. While the capsule is thinnest at the equator where its area is increasing, the anterior and posterior capsule is thinner than the area of ligament attachment.

==== Lens epithelium ====
The lens epithelium is a single layer of cells at the front of the lens between the lens capsule and the lens fibers. By providing the lens fibers with nutrients and removing waste, the cells of the epithelium maintain lens homeostasis. As ions, nutrients, and liquid enter the lens from the aqueous humour, Na^{+}/K^{+}-ATPase pumps in the lens epithelial cells pump ions out of the lens to maintain appropriate lens osmotic concentration and volume, with equatorially positioned lens epithelium cells contributing most to this current. The activity of the Na^{+}/K^{+}-ATPases keeps water and current flowing through the lens from the poles and exiting through the equatorial regions.

The cells of the lens epithelium also divide into new lens fibers at the lens equator. The lens lays down fibers from when it first forms in embryo until death.

==== Lens fibers ====
The lens fibers form the bulk of the lens. They are long, thin, transparent cells, firmly packed, with diameters typically 4–7 micrometres and lengths of up to 12 mm long in humans. The lens fibers stretch lengthwise from the posterior to the anterior poles and, when cut horizontally, are arranged in concentric layers rather like the layers of an onion. If cut along the equator, cells have a hexagonal cross section, appearing as a honeycomb. The approximate middle of each fiber lies around the equator. These tightly packed layers of lens fibers are referred to as laminae. The lens fiber cytoplasms are linked together via gap junctions, intercellular bridges and interdigitations of the cells that resemble "ball and socket" forms.

The lens is split into regions depending on the age of the lens fibers of a particular layer. Moving outwards from the central, oldest layer, the lens is split into an embryonic nucleus, the fetal nucleus, the adult nucleus, the inner and outer cortex. New lens fibers, generated from the lens epithelium, are added to the outer cortex. Mature lens fibers have no organelles or nuclei.

==== Cell fusion, voids and vacuoles ====
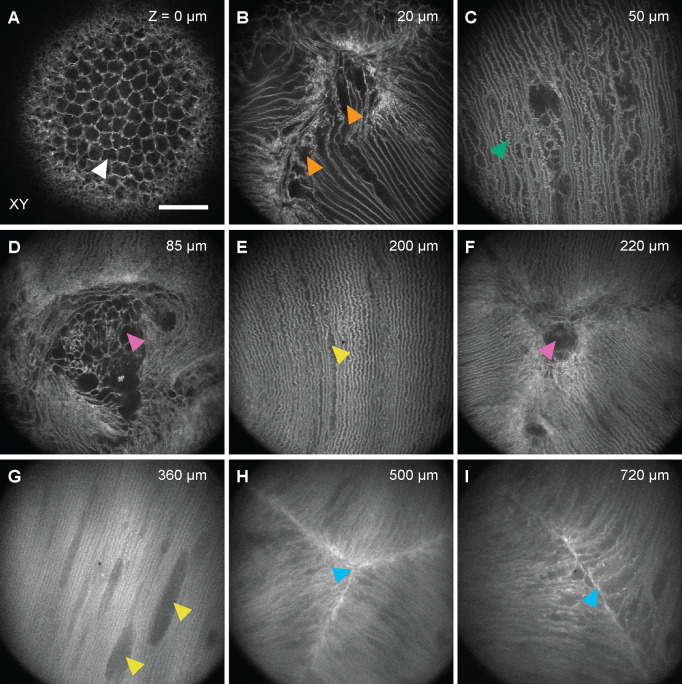
Cellular and supercellular structure in the mouse lens. Photos at increasing depth: A – lens epithelium; B – disorganized and broadened fiber cell ends; C – non-uniform superficial fiber cells with excessive interdigitation; D, F – anterior voids; E, G – mostly uniform rows of fiber cells with enlarged vacuoles; H, I – tight suture structures at depth.

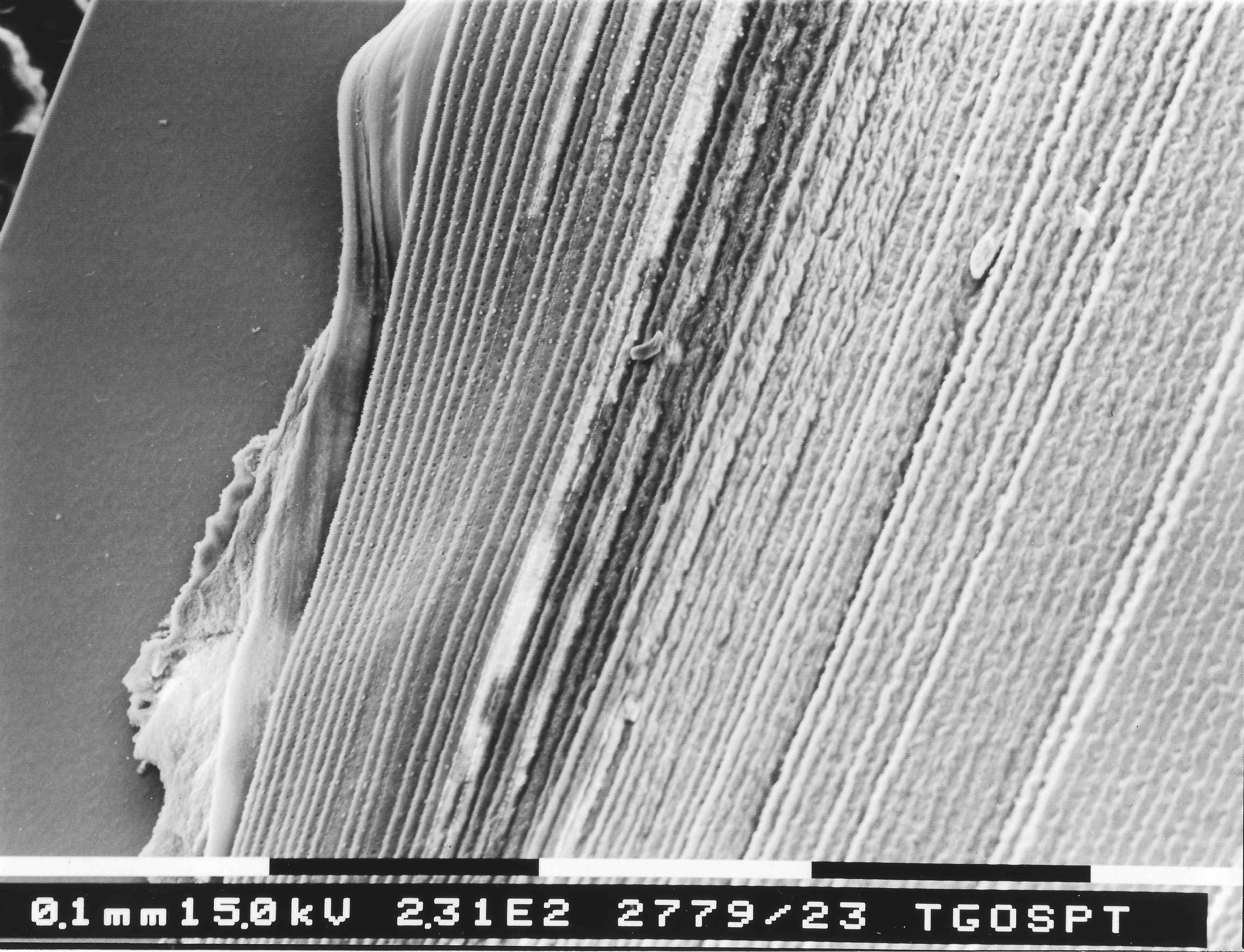
Left to right we have a smooth capsule, a small patch of epithelium, perhaps swollen or fused lens fibers associated with voids, straighter fibers, and finally wrinkled fibers.

With the advent of other ways of looking at cellular structures of lenses while still in the living animal, it became apparent that regions of fiber cells, at least at the lens anterior, contain large voids and vacuoles. These are speculated to be involved in lens transport systems linking the surface of the lens to deeper regions. Very similar looking structures also indicate cell fusion in the lens. The cell fusion is shown by micro-injection to form a stratified syncytium in whole lens cultures.

=== Development ===
Similar to a human, this is a lens forming in a chicken eye.

Development of the vertebrate lens begins when the human embryo is about 4 mm long. The accompanying picture shows the process in a more easily studied chicken embryo. Unlike the rest of the eye which is derived mostly from the inner embryo layers, the lens is derived from the skin around the embryo. The first stage of lens formation takes place when a sphere of cells formed by budding of the inner embryo layers comes close to the embyro's outer skin. The sphere of cells induces nearby outer skin to start changing into the lens placode. The lens placode is the first stage of transformation of a patch of skin into the lens. At this early stage, the lens placode is a single layer of cells.

As development progresses, the lens placode begins to deepen and bow inwards. As the placode continues to deepen, the opening to the surface ectoderm constricts and the lens cells bud off from the embryo's skin to form a sphere of cells known as the "lens vesicle". When the embryo is about 10 mm long the lens vesicle has completely separated from the skin of the embryo.

The embryo then sends signals from the developing retina, inducing the cells closest to the posterior end of the lens vesicle to elongate toward the anterior end of the vesicle. These signals also induce the synthesis of proteins called crystallins. As the name suggests the crystallins can form a clear highly refractive jelly. These elongating cells eventually fill in the center of the vesicle with cells, that are long and thin like a strand of hair, called fibers. These primary fibers become the nucleus in the mature lens. The epithelial cells that do not form into fibers nearest the lens front give rise to the lens epithelium.

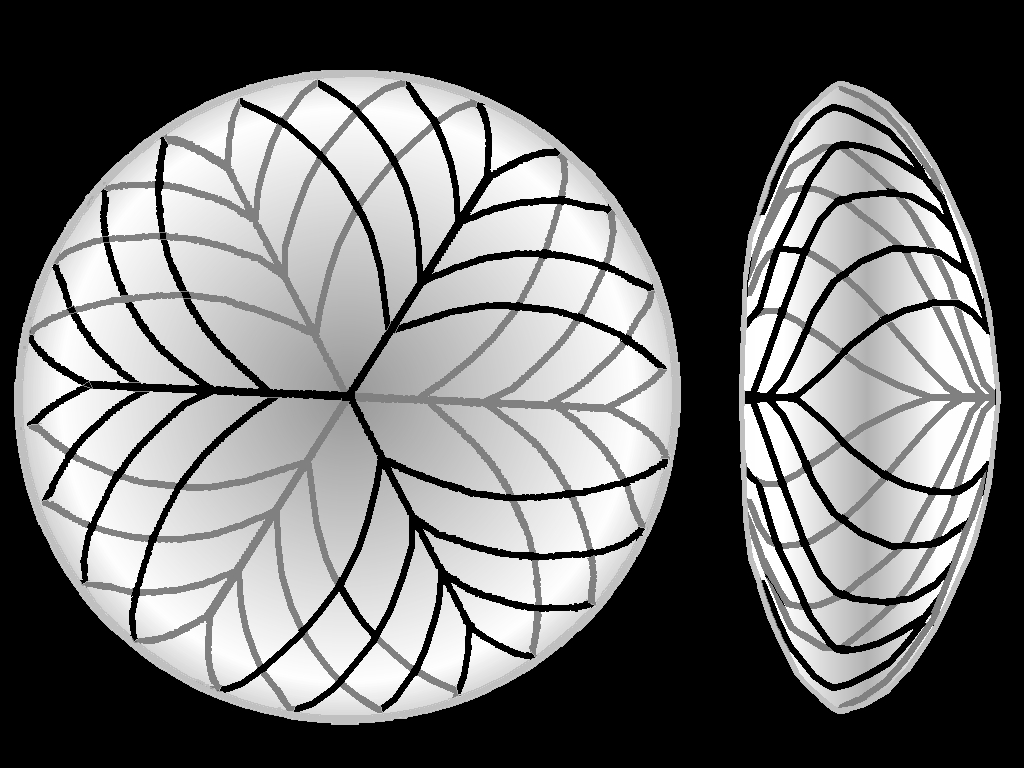
Pattern of lens fibers (anterior and lateral aspect)

Additional fibers are derived from lens epithelial cells located at the lens equator. These cells lengthen towards the front and back wrapping around fibers already laid down. The new fibers need to be longer to cover earlier fibers but as the lens gets larger the ends of the newer fibers no longer reach as far towards the front and back of the lens. The lens fibers that do not reach the poles form tight, interdigitating seams with neighboring fibers. These seams being less crystalline than the bulk of the lens are more visible and are termed "sutures". The suture patterns become more complex as more layers of lens fibers are added to the outer portion of the lens.

The lens continues to grow after birth, with the new secondary fibers being added as outer layers. New lens fibers are generated from the equatorial cells of the lens epithelium, in a region referred to as the "germinative zone" and "bow region". The lens epithelial cells elongate, lose contact with the capsule and epithelium at the back and front of the lens, synthesize crystallin, and then finally lose their nuclei (enucleate) as they become mature lens fibers. In humans, as the lens grows by laying down more fibers through to early adulthood, the lens becomes more ellipsoid in shape. After about age 20 the lens grows rounder again and the iris is very important for this development.

Several proteins control the embryonic development of the lens though PAX6 is considered the master regulator gene of this organ. Other effectors of proper lens development include the Wnt signaling components BCL9 and Pygo2. The whole process of differentiation of the epithelial cells into crystallin filled fiber cells without organelles occurs within the confines of the lens capsule. Older cells cannot be shed and are instead internalized towards the center of the lens. This process results in a complete temporally layered record of the differentiation process from the start at the lens surface to the end at the lens center. The lens is therefore valuable to scientists studying the process of cell differentiation.

=== Variations in lens structure ===
Bony fish eye. Note the spherical lens and muscle to pull the lens backward.

In many aquatic vertebrates, the lens is considerably thicker, almost spherical resulting in increased light refraction. This difference helps compensate for the smaller angle of refraction between the eye's cornea and the watery environment, as they have more similar refractive indices than cornea and air. The fiber cells of fish are generally considerably thinner than those of land vertebrates and it appears crystallin proteins are transported to the organelle free cells at the lens exterior to the inner cells through many layers of cells. Some vertebrates need to see well both above and below water at times. One example is diving birds which have the ability to change focus by 50 to 80 dioptres. Compared with animals adapted for only one environment, diving birds have a somewhat altered lens and cornea structure with focus mechanisms to allow for both environments. Even among terrestrial animals the lens of primates such as humans is unusually flat going some way to explain why our vision, unlike diving birds, is particularly blurry under water.

== Function ==
=== Focusing ===
Eye and detailed ray path including one intraocular lens layer

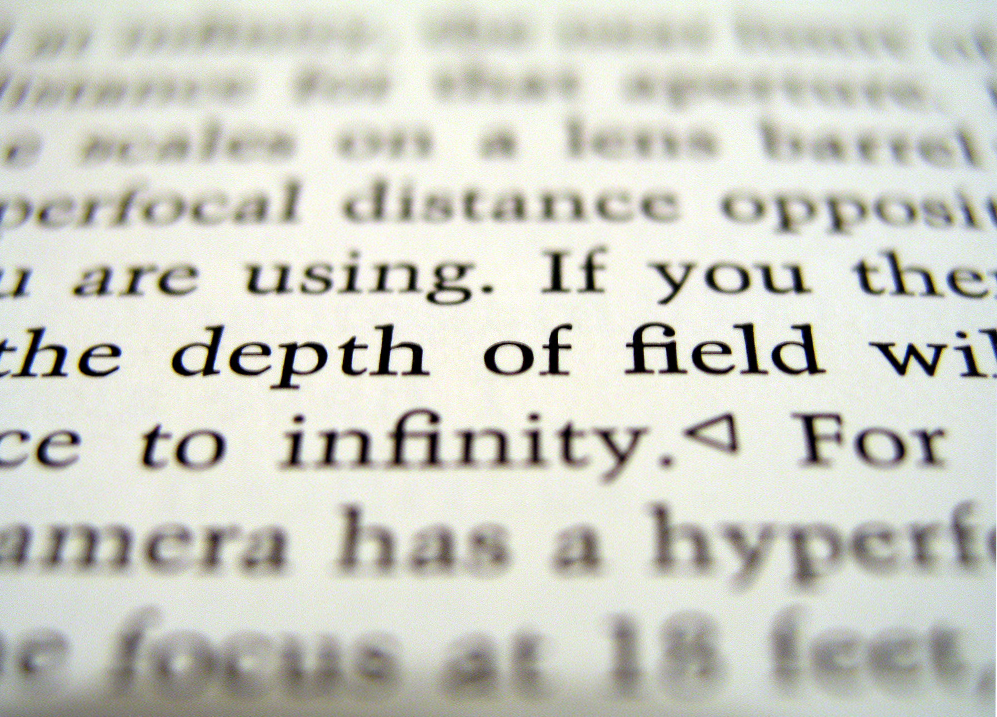
An image that is partially in focus, but mostly out of focus in varying degrees

In humans the widely quoted Helmholtz mechanism of focusing, also called accommodation, is often referred to as a "model". Direct experimental proof of any lens model is necessarily difficult as the vertebrate lens is transparent and functions well only in the living animals. When considering all vertebrates, aspects of all models may play varying roles in lens focus.

==== The shape changing lens of many land based vertebrates ====
3D reconstruction of lens in a living 20-year-old human male focusing from 0 dioptres (infinity) to 4.85 dioptres (26 mm); side & back views

==== External forces ====
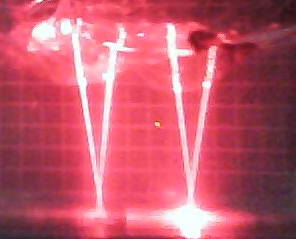
Two horse lenses suspended on water by cling wrap with four approximately parallel lasers directed through them. The 1-cm spaced grid indicates an accommodated, i.e. relaxed, near focus, focal length of around 6 cm.

The model of a shape changing lens of humans was proposed by Thomas Young in a lecture on 27 November 1800. Others such as Hermann von Helmholtz and Thomas Henry Huxley refined the model in the mid-1800s explaining how the ciliary muscle contracts rounding the lens to focus near and this model was popularized by Helmholtz in 1909. The model may be summarized like this. Normally the lens is held under tension by its suspending ligaments being pulled tight by the pressure of the eyeball. At short focal distance the ciliary muscle contracts relieving some of the tension on the ligaments, allowing the lens to elastically round up a bit, increasing refractive power. Changing focus to an object at a greater distance requires a thinner less curved lens. This is achieved by relaxing some of the sphincter like ciliary muscles. While not referenced this presumably allows the pressure in the eyeball to again expand it outwards, pulling harder on the lens making it less curved and thinner, so increasing the focal distance. There is a problem with the Helmholtz model in that despite mathematical models being tried none has come close enough to working using only the Helmholtz mechanisms.

Schachar model of lens focus

Schachar has proposed a model for land-based vertebrates that was not well received. The theory allows mathematical modeling to more accurately reflect the way the lens focuses while also taking into account the complexities in the suspensory ligaments and the presence of radial as well as circular muscles in the ciliary body. In this model, the ligaments may pull to varying degrees on the lens at the equator using the radial muscles while the ligaments offset from the equator to the front and back are relaxed to varying degrees by contracting the circular muscles. These multiple actions operating on the elastic lens allow it to change lens shape at the front more subtly. Not only changing focus, but also correcting for lens aberrations that might otherwise result from the changing shape while better fitting mathematical modeling.

The "catenary" model of lens focus proposed by D. Jackson Coleman demands less tension on the ligaments suspending the lens. Rather than the lens as a whole being stretched thinner for distance vision and allowed to relax for near focus, contraction of the circular ciliary muscles results in the lens having less hydrostatic pressure against its front. The lens front can then reform its shape between the suspensory ligaments in a similar way to a slack chain hanging between two poles might change its curve when the poles are moved closer together. This model requires fluid movement of the lens front only rather than trying to change the shape of the lens as a whole.

==== Internal forces ====
Tracing of Scheimpflug photographs of 20-year-old human lens being thicker focusing near and thinner when focusing far. Internal layering of the lens is also significant.

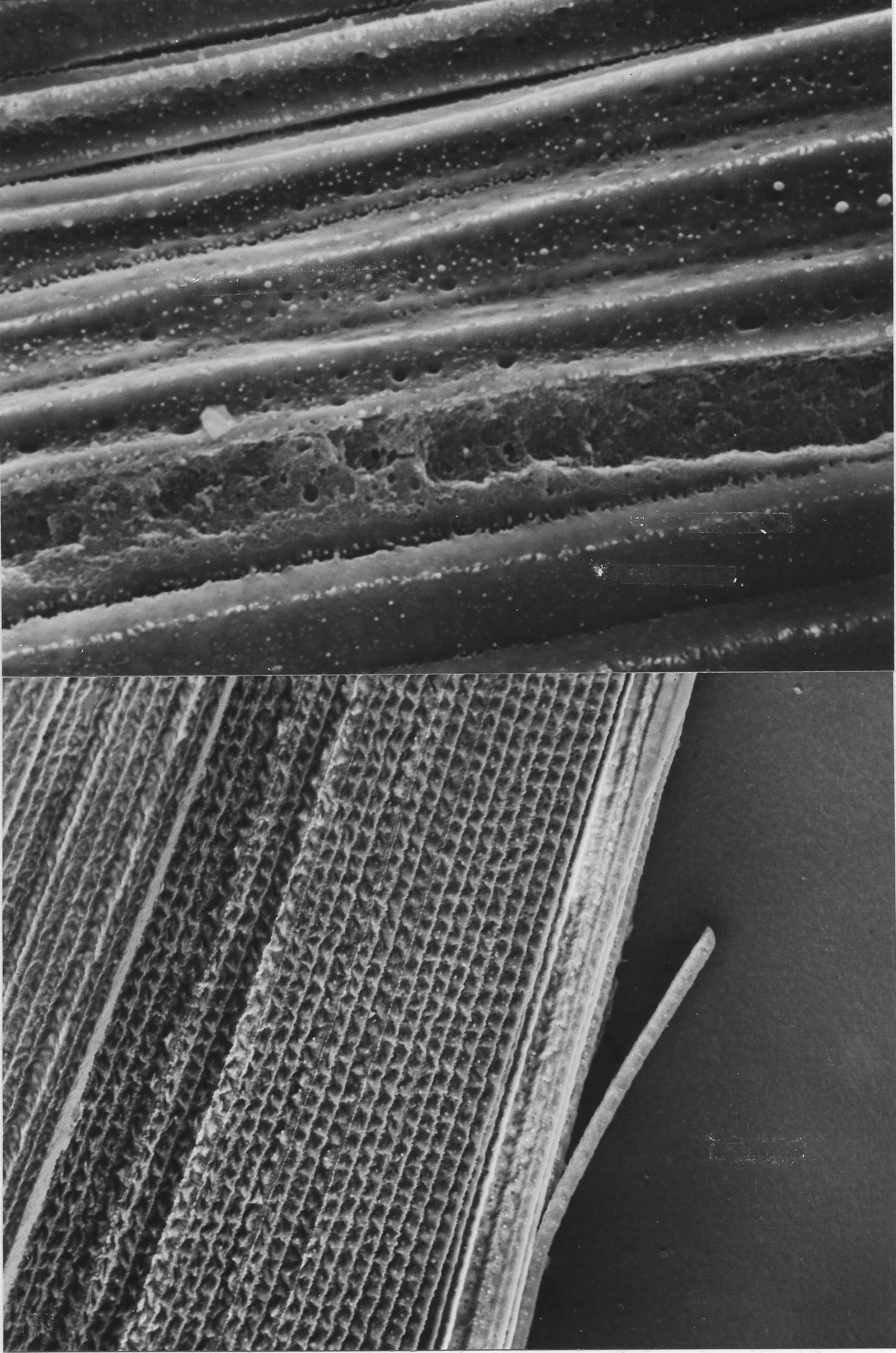
Wrinkled lens fibers in picture below compared to straight fibers above

When Thomas Young proposed the changing of the human lens's shape as the mechanism for focal accommodation in 1801, he thought the lens may be a muscle capable of contraction. This type of model is termed intracapsular accommodation as it relies on activity within the lens. In a 1911 Nobel lecture, Allvar Gullstrand spoke on "How I found the intracapsular mechanism of accommodation" and this aspect of lens focusing continues to be investigated. Young spent time searching for the nerves that could stimulate the lens to contract without success. Since that time it has become clear the lens is not a simple muscle stimulated by a nerve, so the 1909 Helmholtz model took precedence. Pre-twentieth century investigators did not have the benefit of many later discoveries and techniques. Membrane proteins such as aquaporins which allow water to flow into and out of cells are the most abundant membrane protein in the lens. Connexins which allow electrical coupling of cells are also prevalent. Electron microscopy and immunofluorescent microscopy show fiber cells to be highly variable in structure and composition. Magnetic resonance imaging confirms a layering in the lens that may allow for different refractive plans within it. The refractive index of human lens varies from approximately 1.406 in the central layers down to 1.386 in less dense layers of the lens. This index gradient enhances the optical power of the lens. As more is learned about mammalian lens structure from in situ Scheimpflug photography, MRI and physiological investigations, it is becoming apparent the lens itself is not responding entirely passively to the surrounding ciliary muscle but may be able to change its overall refractive index through mechanisms involving water dynamics in the lens still to be clarified. The accompanying micrograph shows wrinkled fibers from a relaxed sheep lens after it is removed from the animal indicating shortening of the lens fibers during near focus accommodation. The age related changes in the human lens may also be related to changes in the water dynamics in the lens.

==== Lenses of birds, reptiles, amphibians, fish and others ====
Diving bird (cormorant) lens focusing can be up to 80 dioptres for clearer underwater vision.

Bony fish eye. Note the more spherical lens than in land-based animals and a retractor lentis muscle to pull the lens backward.

In reptiles and birds, the ciliary body which supports the lens via suspensory ligaments also touches the lens with a number of pads on its inner surface. These pads compress and release the lens to modify its shape while focusing on objects at different distances; the suspensory ligaments usually perform this function in mammals. With vision in fish and amphibians, the lens is fixed in shape, and focusing is instead achieved by moving the lens forwards or backwards within the eye using a muscle called the retractor lentis.

In cartilaginous fish, the suspensory ligaments are replaced by a membrane, including a small muscle at the underside of the lens. This muscle pulls the lens forward from its relaxed position when focusing on nearby objects. In teleosts, by contrast, a muscle (retractor lentis) projects from a vascular structure in the floor of the eye, called the falciform process, and serves to pull the lens backwards from the relaxed position to focus on distant objects. The muscle is antagonistic to the suspensory ligaments. While amphibians move the lens forward, as do cartilaginous fish, the muscles involved are not similar in either type of animal. In frogs, there are two muscles, one above and one below the lens, while other amphibians have only the lower muscle.

In the simplest vertebrates, the lampreys and hagfish, the lens is not attached to the outer surface of the eyeball at all. There is no aqueous humour in these fish, and the vitreous body simply presses the lens against the surface of the cornea. To focus its eyes, a lamprey flattens the cornea using muscles outside of the eye and pushes the lens backwards.

While not vertebrate, brief mention is made here of the convergent evolution of vertebrate and molluscan eyes. The most complex molluscan eye is the cephalopod eye which is superficially similar in structure and function to a vertebrate eye, including accommodation, while differing in basic ways such as having a two part lens and no cornea. The fundamental requirements of optics must be filled by all eyes with lenses using the tissues at their disposal so superficially eyes all tend to look similar. It is the way optical requirements are met using different cell types and structural mechanisms that varies among animals.

=== Crystallins and transparency ===
Graph showing optical density (OD) of the human crystalline lens for newborn, 30-year-old, and 65-year-old from wavelengths 300-1400 nm

Crystallins are water-soluble proteins that compose over 90% of the protein within the lens. The three main crystallin types found in the human eye are α-, β-, and γ-crystallins. Crystallins tend to form soluble, high-molecular weight aggregates that pack tightly in lens fibers, thus increasing the index of refraction of the lens while maintaining its transparency. β and γ crystallins are found primarily in the lens, while subunits of α -crystallin have been isolated from other parts of the eye and the body. α-crystallin proteins belong to a larger superfamily of molecular chaperone proteins, and so it is believed that the crystallin proteins were evolutionarily recruited from chaperone proteins for optical purposes. The chaperone functions of α-crystallin may also help maintain the lens proteins, which must last a human for their entire lifetime.

Another important factor in maintaining the transparency of the lens is the absence of light-scattering organelles such as the nucleus, endoplasmic reticulum, and mitochondria within the mature lens fibers. Lens fibers also have a very extensive cytoskeleton that maintains the precise shape and packing of the lens fibers; disruptions/mutations in certain cytoskeletal elements can lead to the loss of transparency.

The lens blocks most ultraviolet light in the wavelength range of 300–400 nm; shorter wavelengths are blocked by the cornea. The pigment responsible for blocking the light is 3-hydroxykynurenine glucoside, a product of tryptophan catabolism in the lens epithelium. High intensity ultraviolet light can harm the retina, and artificial intraocular lenses are therefore manufactured to also block ultraviolet light. People lacking a lens (a condition known as aphakia) perceive ultraviolet light as whitish blue or whitish-violet.

=== Nourishment ===
The lens is metabolically active and requires nourishment in order to maintain its growth and transparency. Compared to other tissues in the eye, however, the lens has considerably lower energy demands.

By nine weeks into human development, the lens is surrounded and nourished by a net of vessels, the tunica vasculosa lentis, which is derived from the hyaloid artery. Beginning in the fourth month of development, the hyaloid artery and its related vasculature begin to atrophy and completely disappear by birth. In the postnatal eye, Cloquet's canal marks the former location of the hyaloid artery.

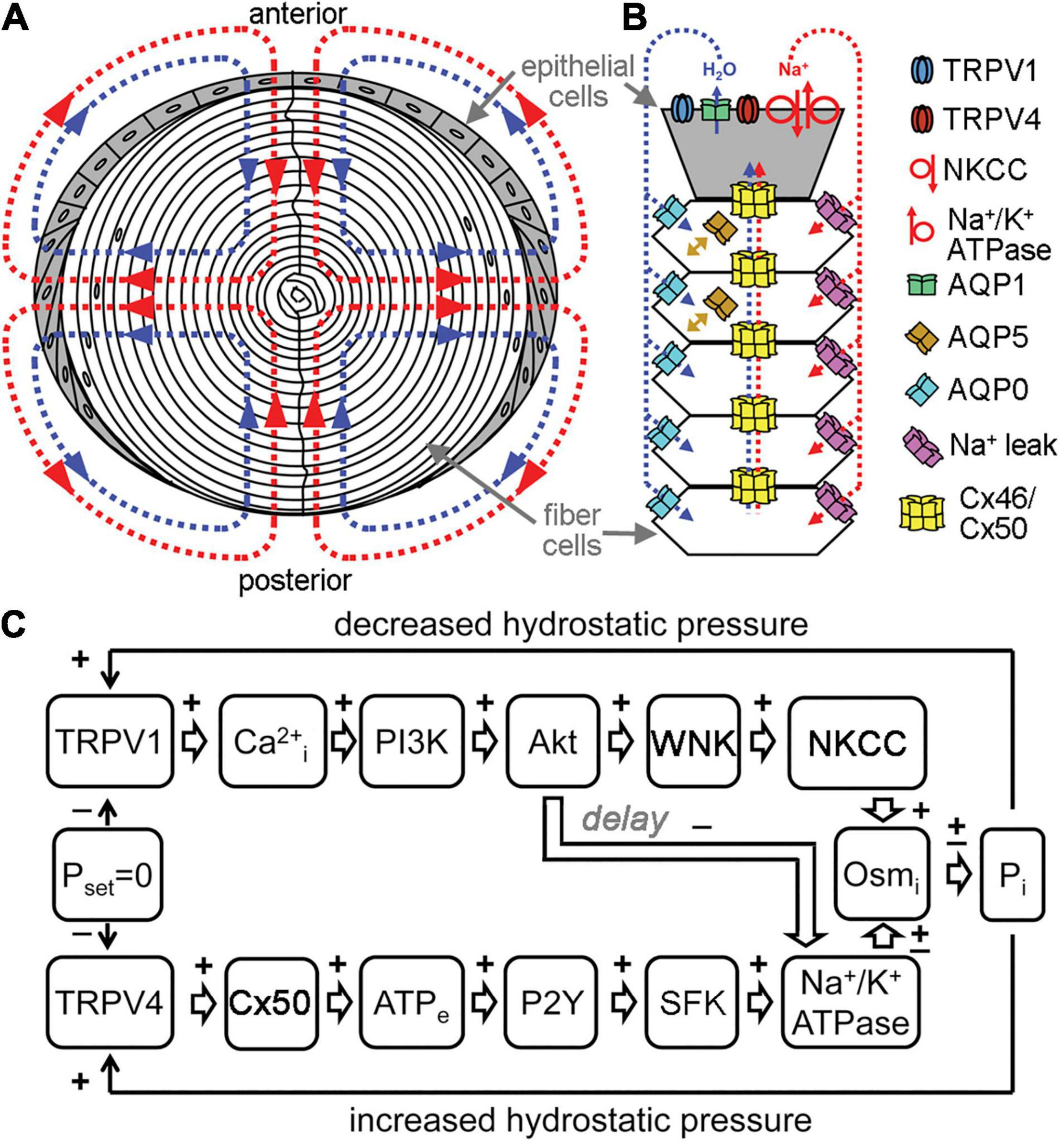
Channels regulate lens transport.

After regression of the hyaloid artery, the lens receives all its nourishment from the aqueous humour. Nutrients diffuse in and waste diffuses out through a constant flow of fluid from the anterior/posterior poles of the lens and out of the equatorial regions, a dynamic that is maintained by the Na^{+}/K^{+}-ATPase pumps located in the equatorially positioned cells of the lens epithelium. The interaction of these pumps with water channels into cells called aquaporins, molecules less than 100 daltons in size among cells via gap junctions, and calcium using transporters/regulators (TRPV channels) results in a flow of nutrients throughout the lens.

Glucose is the primary energy source for the lens. As mature lens fibers do not have mitochondria, approximately 80% of the glucose is metabolized via anaerobic metabolism. The remaining fraction of glucose is shunted primarily down the pentose phosphate pathway. The lack of aerobic respiration means that the lens consumes very little oxygen.

== Clinical significance ==
- Cataracts are opacities of the lens. While some are small and do not require any treatment, others may be large enough to block light and obstruct vision. Cataracts usually develop as the aging lens becomes more and more opaque, but cataracts can also form congenitally or after injury to the lens. Nuclear sclerosis is a type of age-related cataract. Diabetes is another risk factor for cataract. Cataract surgery involves the removal of the lens and insertion of an artificial intraocular lens.
- Presbyopia is the age-related loss of accommodation, which is marked by the inability of the eye to focus on nearby objects. The exact mechanism is still unknown, but age-related changes in the elasticity, shape, and size of the lens have all been linked to the condition.
- Ectopia lentis is the displacement of the lens from its normal position.
- Aphakia is the absence of the lens from the eye. Aphakia can be the result of surgery or injury, or it can be congenital.

== Additional images ==
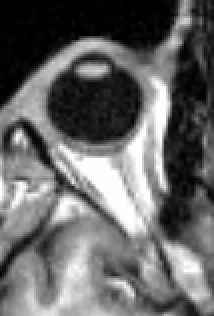
MRI scan of human eye showing lens

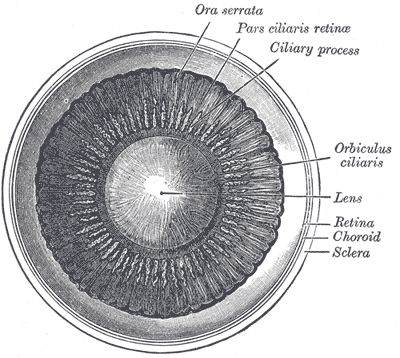
Interior of anterior chamber of eye

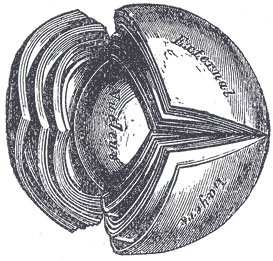
The crystalline lens, hardened and divided

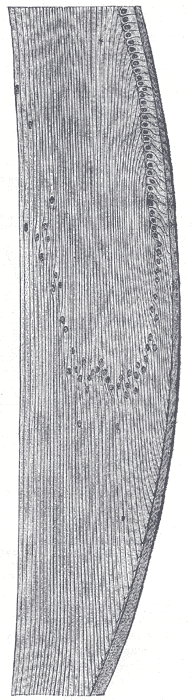
Section through the margin of the lens, showing the transition of the epithelium into the lens fibers known as the bow region

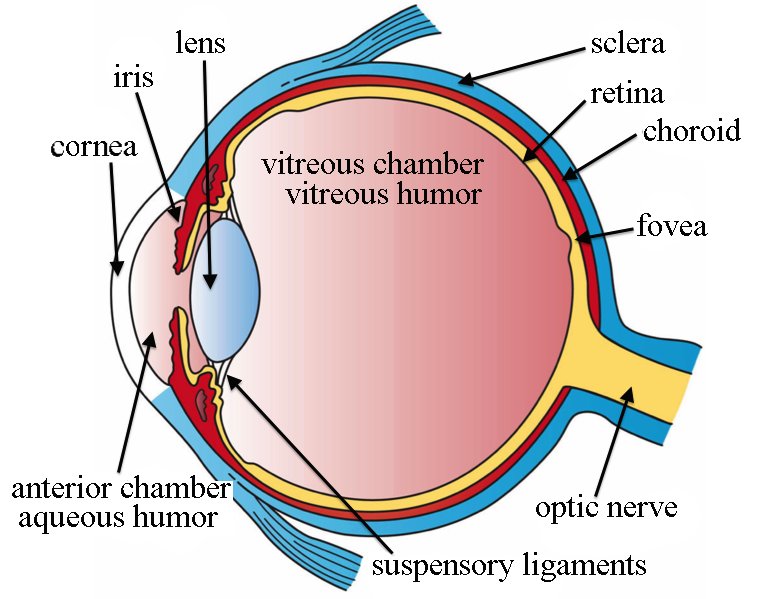
The structures of the eye labeled

Another view of the eye and the structures of the eye labeled

This svg file was configured so that the rays, diaphragm and crystalline lens are easily modified

== See also ==
- Accommodation reflex
- Crystallin
- Evolution of the eye, for how the lens evolved
- Intraocular lenses
- Iris
- Lens capsule
- Phacoemulsification
- Visual perception
- Zonules of Zinn

== Bibliography ==
- Forrester, John; Dick, Andrew; McMenamin, Paul; Lee, William (1996). The Eye: Basic Sciences in Practice. London: W. B. Saunders Company Ltd. ISBN 0-7020-1790-6.
