= Tunica vasculosa lentis =

Details

Identifiers
- Latin: tunica vasculosa lentis

The tunica vasculosa lentis is an extensive capillary network, spreading over the posterior and lateral surfaces of the lens of the eye. It disappears normally shortly after birth, through apoptosis.

The structure was not studied properly and in detail until the 1960s, when new technologies developed to allow the preservation of the networks in fetuses. The scanning electron microscope finally enabled researchers to see the network even in very small laboratory animals such as the mouse embryo.

== See also ==
- Comparative vertebrate anatomy
- Ophthalmology
- Persistent tunica vasculosa lentis
