= Surface ectoderm =

Embryonic division of the ectoderm

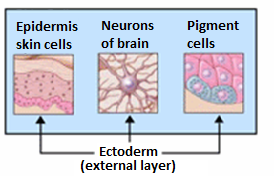
- Organs derived from ectoderm.

Details
- Precursor: Ectoderm

Identifiers
- FMA: 87656

The surface ectoderm, AKA external ectoderm, is one of the two early embryonic divisions of the ectoderm. The other early division of the ectoderm is the neuroectoderm.

The surface ectoderm develops into the following structures:

- Skin (only the epidermis; the dermis is derived from the mesoderm) (along with glands, hair, and nails)
- The epithelium of the mouth and nasal cavity
- The glands of the mouth and nasal cavity, namely the saliva glands and the mucosal glands
- Tooth enamel (as a side note, dentin and dental pulp are formed from the ectomesenchyme, which is derived from the neuroectoderm (specifically neural crest cells, and it travels with mesenchymal cells)
- The epithelium of the anterior pituitary gland
- The lens, cornea, lacrimal gland, tarsal glands, and the conjunctiva of the eye
- The apical ectodermal ridge, which induces the development of the limb buds of the embryo

== See also ==
- List of human cell types derived from the germ layers
