= Howard Gimbel =

Canadian ophthalmologist, professor, editor and amateur musician

Howard Gimbel FRCSC, AOE, FACS, CABES
- Born: January 17, 1934 (age 92); Calgary, Alberta
- Education: Canadian University College
- Occupations: Ophthalmologist, university professor, senior editor, and amateur musician
- Known for: Invention of the continuous curvilinear capsulorhexis
- Relatives: Jacob and Ruth Gimbel
- Medical career
- Field: Ophthalmology
- Institutions: Gimbel Eye Centre
- Sub-specialties: Phacoemulsification
- Awards: Order of Canada

Howard V. Gimbel FRCSC, AOE, FACS, CABES, (born January 17, 1934) is a Canadian ophthalmologist, university professor, senior editor, and amateur musician. He is better known for his invention, along with Thomas Neuhann, of the continuous curvilinear capsulorhexis (CCC), a technique employed in modern cataract surgery.

== Early life ==
Gimbel was born in Calgary, Alberta. The son of Jacob and Ruth Gimbel, he grew up along with five siblings on a grain and dairy farm east of Calgary near the small town of Beiseker. In 1952, he graduated from high school at Canadian University College near Lacombe (Alberta). He attended Walla Walla University in Washington, and graduated with a degree in physics. It was here where he met his wife and lifetime companion, Judy Carl, whom he married on the evening of his graduation day.

== Education ==
Gimbel attended medical school at Loma Linda University School of Medicine (California), and graduated in 1960. Given his physics background and interest in optics, the choice of specialization in Ophthalmology came naturally to him. After completing his residency training at White Memorial Medical Center (Los Angeles, California) in 1964, Gimbel returned to Calgary where he set up his Ophthalmology practice. Always an early adaptor of new technologies, he soon became known as "Gadget Gimbel".

In January 1974, Gimbel took a course with Charles Kelman in phacoemulsification, a surgical technique for the removal of cataracts through a suture-less, 3 mm incision. Prior to phacoemulsification, cataract surgery required a 10 to 12 mm incision, which was closed with sutures and caused significant astigmatism. Later that same year, he attended the first International Intraocular Lens Implantation Course by Cornelius "Cees" Binkhorst and Jan Worst in the Netherlands. Despite being considered standard care today, the concept of intraocular lens implantation during cataract surgery was a topic of much controversy at the time. These two novel techniques had a profound influence on Gimbel, who was among the first ophthalmologists in North America to successfully implement them into his practice.

== Career ==
In 1984, Gimbel introduced radial keratotomy to Canada, a refractive surgery technique in which peripheral corneal incisions are carefully placed to correct refractive errors. That same year he founded an eye surgery centre dedicated to the treatment of cataracts and refractive surgery, the Gimbel Eye Centre. It was around this time that he perfected the continuous curvilinear capsulorhexis (CCC), and the divide and conquer nucleofractis techniques, two techniques currently employed in small incision cataract surgery. His excellent surgical outcomes compelled him to share these techniques and others with his colleagues at universities and societies around the world through presentations, videotape distribution, and over 25 live satellite broadcasts at international conferences.

As the first surgeon in Canada to acquire the excimer laser for refractive surgery, Gimbel has remained at the forefront of refractive vision correction. In 1990, the first photorefractive keratectomy (PRK) procedure in Canada was performed at the Gimbel Eye Centre by John A. van Westenbrugge. PRK is a laser treatment of the corneal surface for the correction of refractive errors. Similarly, Gimbel was the first surgeon in North America to offer the Implantable Collamer Lens (ICL) to his patients in 1997. The ICL is a posterior chamber, phakic intraocular lens used for the correction of moderate to high refractive errors.

In February 2000, Gimbel accepted an appointment as department Chair to the Department of Ophthalmology at Loma Linda University, where he remained Chair until 2014. He is also an associate professor of Ophthalmology at the University of Calgary, and director of the Anterior Segment and Refractive Surgery fellowship at the Gimbel Eye Centre. In 2009, he was presented with the Canadian Ophthalmological Society Lifetime Achievement Award, and is considered one of the most influential and accomplished ophthalmologists in the world.

=== Continuous Curvilinear Capsulorhexis ===
The continuous curvilinear capsulorhexis (CCC) has been crucial to modern cataract surgery. It consists of making a small circular opening on the anterior surface of the crystalline lens to facilitate subsequent phacoemulsification and cataract removal. This technique constitutes a marked improvement from the previous can-opener capsulorhexis, where multiple small anterior capsular tears were connected. By providing a smooth, continuous surface that resists radial extension, the CCC significantly improved the safety and ease of phacoemulsification, effectively popularizing it. Gimbel employed this technique as early as 1983, and published his landmark description of it in 1991, along with Thomas Neuhann.

=== Divide and Conquer Nucleofractis (CCC) ===
One of the basic techniques of cataract nucleofractis (fragmentation and removal), divide and conquer is among the safest approaches to phacoemulsification and cataract removal. Its safety is reflected in being among the first techniques of phacoemulsification taught to ophthalmology residents and beginner surgeons around the world. It consists of fashioning two orthogonal and deep central grooves in the crystalline lens nucleus, followed by mechanical fracturing of the cataract with the phacoemulsification probe and second instrument. This effectively divides the cataract into four quadrants that are more easily removed by phacoemulsification. Gimbel initially proposed this technique in 1991.

Kwitko was the first to perform and introduce radial keratotomy to Canada.

== Other innovations and techniques ==
Year	Innovations & Techniques
2009	Capsule membrane suturing
2008	Conjunctival advancing scleral tunnel (CAST) incision
2005	Five variations of intraocular lens optic capture
1987	Posterior continuous curvilinear capsulorhexis (PCCC)
1985	First Canadian ophthalmologist to implement telemedicine for teaching
1980	First Canadian ophthalmologist to perform surgery in non-hospital setting

== Family life and interests ==
Gimbel currently lives in Calgary, Alberta. He commutes every two weeks between his private practice at the Gimbel Eye Centre in Calgary and his chairman position at Loma Linda University. A lifelong Seventh-day Adventist, he is the father of five children, and has 12 grandchildren. He has a 1,750 acre farm, which he visits on his free time. Besides farming, he enjoys family reunions, hiking, singing in choral groups, and playing musical saw and trombone. He is able to accomplish all of these activities with the support of his wife Judy, who provides organizational support for his travel plans, conferences, and other commitments.

== Awards and recognitions ==
2018	Order of Canada
2010	Calgary Medical Society Physician of the Year Award
2010	Premier Surgeon PS250
2009	STAAR Lifetime Achievement Award
2009	International Intraocular Implant Club's IIIC Award
2009	Canadian Ophthalmological Society Lifetime Achievement Award
2009	Loma Linda University School of Medicine Alumnus of the Year Award
2006	Charles Kelman Award
2005	Binkhorst Medal ASCRS.org/node/20542
2005	Canadian Society of Cataract and Refractive Surgery Lifetime Achievement Award
2005	One of Alberta's Physicians of the Century Award
1994	Top 50 Opinion Leaders of Cataract and Refractive Surgery Today
1992	Alberta Order of Excellence
