= Machemer =

Machemer is a surname. Notable people with the surname include:

- Dave Machemer (born 1951), American baseball player, manager, and scout
- Helmut Machemer (1902/03–1942), German ophthalmologist and army officer
- Robert Machemer (1933–2009), German-American ophthalmologist and inventor
