= Steve Charles =

Steve Charles may refer to:

- Steve Charles (footballer)
- Steve Charles (surgeon)
- Steve Charles, musician with Western Flyer
