= Hydrodelineation =

Separating the nucleus of a cataract from its cortex using an injection of water

Hydrodelineation is a method of separating an outer shell (or multiple shells) of the lens of the eye from the central compact mass of inner nuclear cataract (also called endonucleus) during a cataract surgery by the forceful irrigation of a fluid into the mass of the nucleus. While hydrodissection disconnects the lens from the lens capsule, hydrodelineation splits it into endonuclear and epinuclear sections thus reducing the size of the hard nucleus, making its extraction possible through a smaller incision. This also facilitates phacoemulsification.

An injection of fluid into the body of the lens through the cortex against the nucleus of a cataract separates the hardened nuclear cataract from the softer lens cortex shell by flowing along the interface between them. The smaller hard nucleus can then be expeditiously phacoemulsified, while the posterior cortecx serves as a buffer protecting the posterior capsule membrane. The smaller size of the separated nucleus requires less deep and less peripheral grooving and produces smaller fragments after cracking or chopping. The posterior cortex also maintains the shape of the capsule which reduces risk of posterior capsule rupture.
