= Anton Banko =

Slovenian inventor and engineer

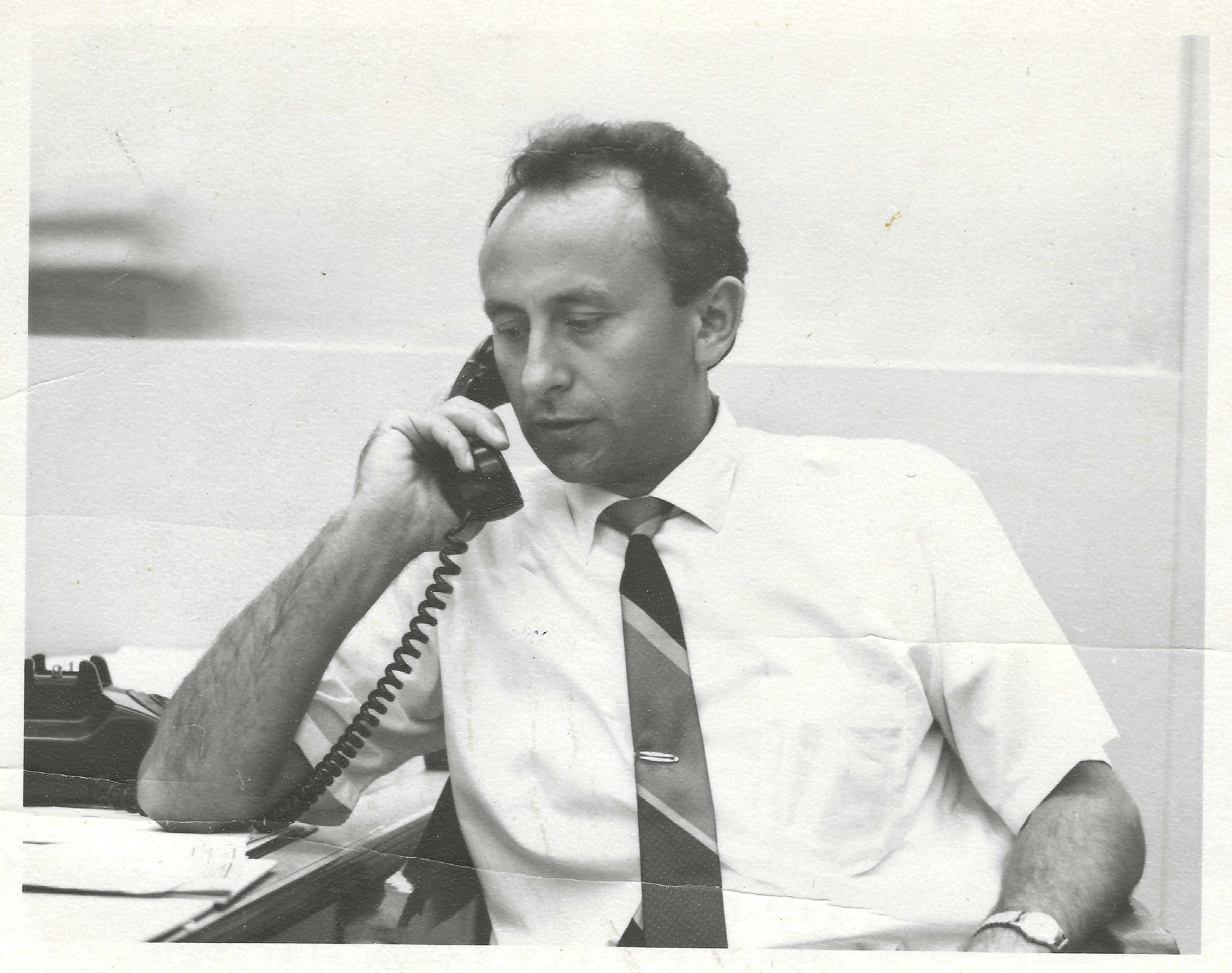
- Banko in 1964
- Born: 26 August 1927; Žminj, Istria Yugoslavia
- Died: 18 May 1986 (aged 58); New York City, New York, U.S.
- Citizenship: Yugoslavia, USA
- Education: State Technical Secondary School Ljubljana Slovenia 1953; Ljubljana University, Mechanical Engineer 1959
- Known for: Co-inventory of Phacoemulsification; Inventor of rotary and guillotine Vitrectomy instrumentation; Method patent on the surgical procedure for Victrectomy; Introduction of Ocusystem in 1980
- Spouse: Stanislava Strukelj (m. 1950)
- Children: 2
- Website: surgicaldesign.com

Anton Banko (August 26, 1927 – May 18, 1986) was a Slovenian engineer who co-invented phacoemulsification surgery with Charles Kelman, in June 1971. Banko also developed and patented several ophthalmic surgical techniques, including the procedure for pars plana vitrectomy for which he filed a patent in 1968. In addition, he invented and patented specialized vitreoretinal surgical instrumentation that became foundational to modern vitrectomy systems.

== Childhood, youth and education ==
Anton Banko was born on August 26, 1927, in Vadediji, a small village in Žminj on the Istrian Peninsula. During his childhood, he lived with his mother, Lucia Banko, and his two sisters, Maria and Albina, in the nearby town of Kanfanar.

At the time of his birth, Istria was part of Italy, having been annexed in 1920 following World War I. After World War II, most of the peninsula became part of Yugoslavia in 1947 and today lies primarily within Croatia, with its northern portion in Slovenia.

Banko demonstrated an aptitude for academics from an early age and attended secondary school in Ljubljana, Slovenia. He later enrolled at the University of Ljubljana, where he studied mechanical engineering while working for the transportation company Slavnik Koper in Slovenia. He graduated with a degree in mechanical engineering in 1959.

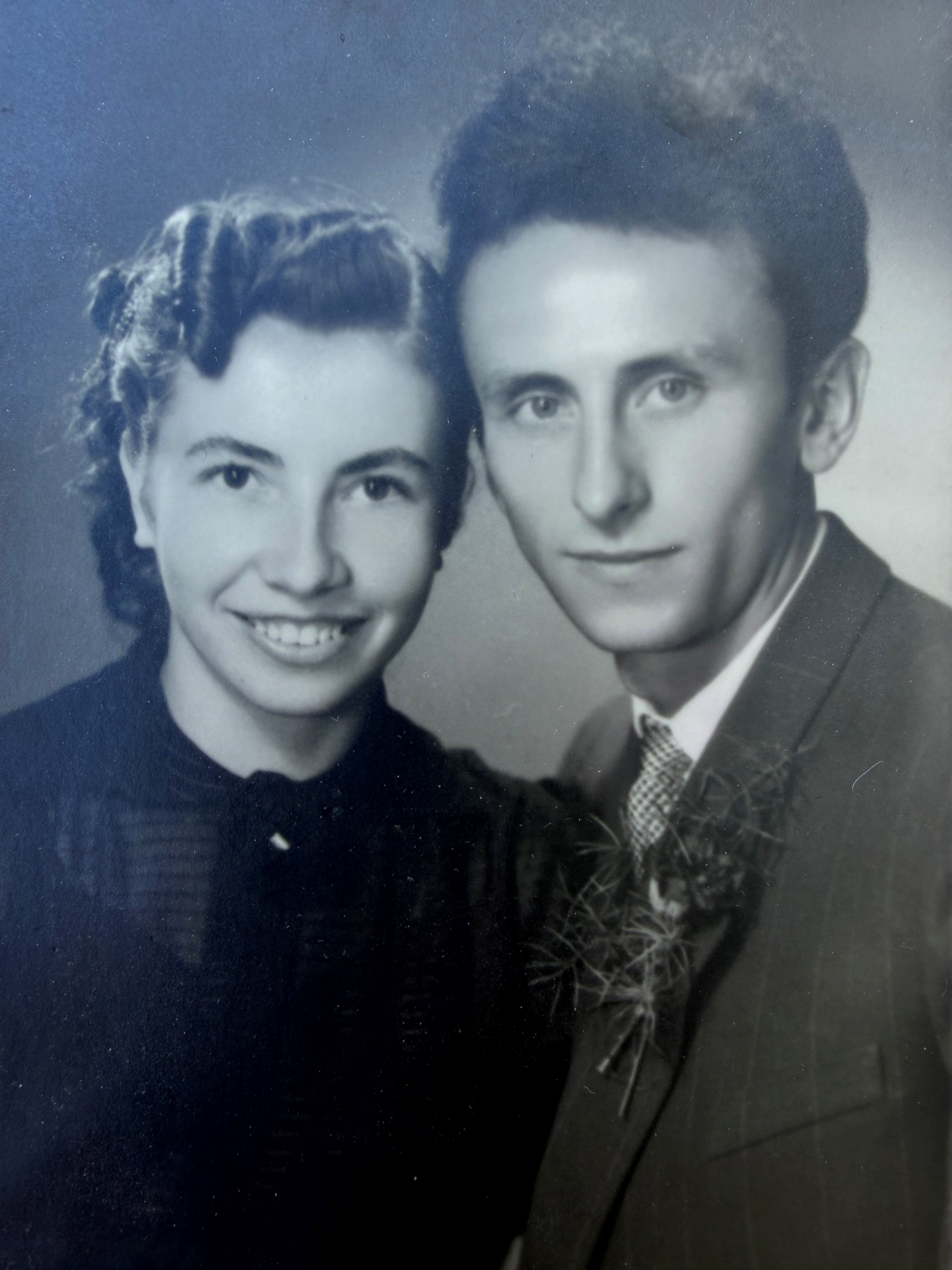
Anton and Stanislava in 1950

Banko married Stanislava Banko (née Strukelj) on August 26, 1950. The couple welcomed their first child, William Banko, in July 1955. On May 9, 1962, Banko, his wife, and their son emigrated to the United States, where they later became naturalized American citizens.

Banko's first job in the United States was with Sandex Inc. in Brooklyn, New York. In 1963, he joined Cavitron Ultrasonics in Long Island City, New York, where he was soon promoted to Manager of Research. During this period, Banko and his wife purchased their first home in Brooklyn and welcomed their second child, Lucia Diana Banko.

== Phacoemulsification ==
In 1962 doctor Charles Kelman started seeking a method to remove cataracts through a smaller surgical incision. At the time, cataract surgery required a large incision to remove the lens in one piece, often requiring an extended hospital stay. The large incision could also affect the shape of the eye and limit visual outcomes. After two years of research using mechanical cutting methods, Kelman failed to find a suitable approach.

Following a visit to his dentist, Kelman became interested in whether ultrasonic technology can emulsify a cataract, because the dentist was using the ultrasonic dental cleaning equipment manufactured by Cavitron Ultrasonics. According to Kelman’s account in his book Through My Eyes, he approached Cavitron Ultrasonics regarding this possibility. Anton Banko met Kelman for the first time on July 13, 1965.

Based on Banko’s recommendation that ultrasonic energy could be applied to an instrument capable of emulsifying a cataract lens, Cavitron Ultrasonics president Robert E. Navin approved Banko’s proposal on July 14, 1965. Banko was then tasked with designing a prototype instrument intended to remove cataracts through a smaller incision, an approach that became the foundation for modern phacoemulsification cataract surgery.

Based on his experience developing surgical technology with Kelman, Banko became convinced that small-incision surgery represented the future of all surgery. On July 23, 1968, he founded Surgical Design Corporation in Long Island City, New York, to develop and manufacture his small-incision surgical instruments.

== Pars Plana Vitrectomy ==
In 1968 Banko invented and patented the surgical method for pars plana vitrectomy, a technique that allowed surgeons to access the vitreous cavity through small incisions in the pars plana region of the eye rather than opening the eye extensively to reach the posterior segment. This approach became a foundation of modern vitreoretinal surgery.

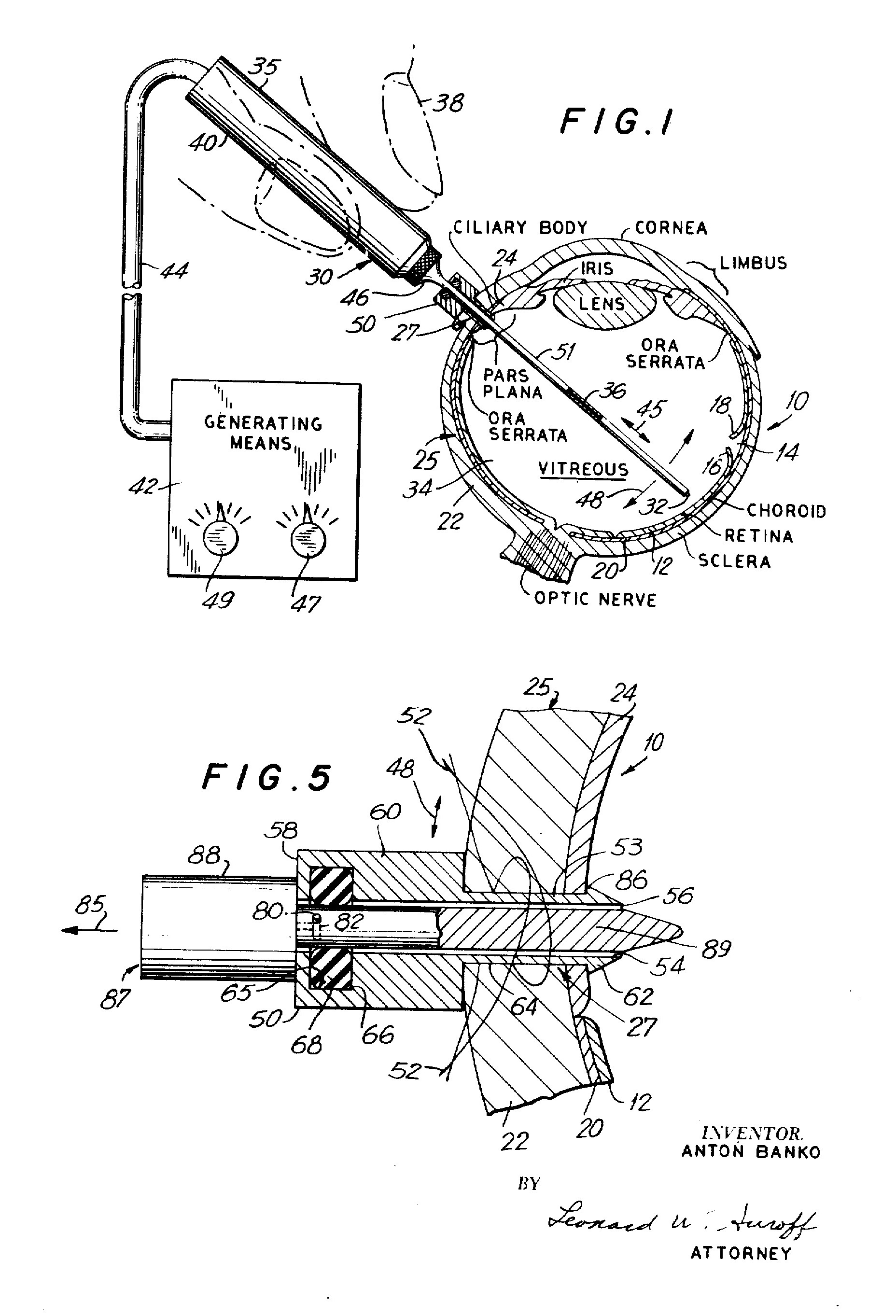
Anton Banko's 1968 U.S. patent drawings for the original vitrectomy instrumentation

Banko also patented the first guillotine and rotary vitrectomy instruments and developed several generations of vitrectomy surgical systems. In 1968, he mailed drawings of his prototype instruments to retinal surgeons in the United States. These designs attracted the attention of Charles Schepens, founder of the Retina Foundation, who contacted Banko. Their collaboration resulted in several publications describing Banko’s vitrectomy instrumentation and its potential applications in retinal surgery.

During this period, owners of surgical method patents could restrict others from performing a patented procedure without their authorization. Although Banko held a patent covering the pars plana vitrectomy procedure, he chose not to enforce the patent, allowing other surgeons, including Robert Machemer, to perform the first vitrectomy procedure.

Banko continued to refine vitrectomy instrumentation, developing systems that improved surgical control and precision. His work culminated in the Model M-5 Surgical System, introduced in 1973, which was used by surgeons at the Retina Foundation for vitreoretinal procedures. The system incorporated automated pressurized infusion, an early implementation of technology that later became standard in vitreoretinal surgery. Similar automated infusion technology was introduced commercially by Alcon Laboratories decades later.

== The Ocusystem ==
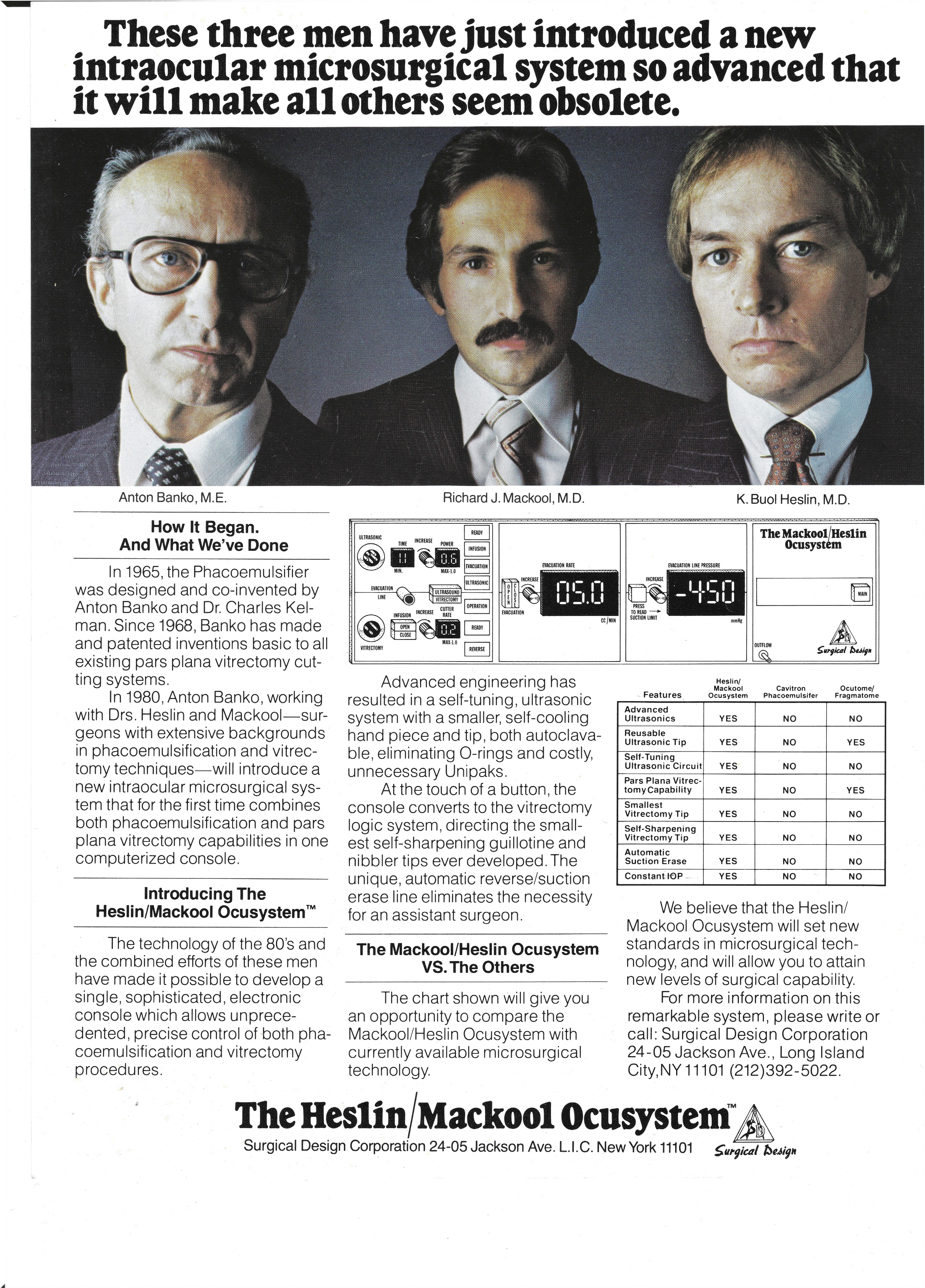
A 1980 advertisement for the Ocusystem published in the ASCRS journal

In 1979, Anton Banko began a series of discussions with ophthalmic surgeons that led him to design a new phacoemulsification surgical system. At the time, Cavitron Ultrasonics was marketing the Cavitron 8000 Phacoemulsifier, a system originally designed by Banko that had subsequently undergone further modifications by other engineers. The Cavitron system used a water-cooled handpiece, in which nonsterile cooling water was circulated around the vibrating magnetostrictive nickel laminations to dissipate the heat generated during operation. The system also lacked an integrated mechanism for preventing post-occlusion surge and required the use of a separate vitrectomy system manufactured by other companies.

Encouraged by ophthalmic surgeons including Dr. K. Buol Heslin and Dr. Richard J. Mackool, Banko developed a new phacoemulsification device in 1980, known as the Ocusystem. The system incorporated several unique design innovations intended to improve surgical control, safety, and efficiency. These included an air-cooled ultrasonic handpiece, automatic ultrasound tuning, surge prevention with vacuum limits, automated ultrasound delivery, pulsed ultrasound modes, and an integrated vitrectomy system. The Ocusystem also incorporated reusable silicone tubing and titanium phacoemulsification tips, which reduced operating costs compared with disposable components.

Following the introduction of the Ocusystem, Banko conducted surgical training courses for ophthalmologists from around the world, focusing on techniques enabled by advances in phacoemulsification technology. The courses included lectures and wet laboratories and featured experienced phacoemulsification surgeons from the United States and Europe, including Professor Thomas Neuhann of Germany.

== Legacy ==
In 1986, Anton Banko was diagnosed with dermatomyositis, an inflammatory disease that primarily affected his lungs. He died on May 18, 1986, at the age of 58. At the time of his death, his son William Banko was completing medical school and later assumed management of Surgical Design after graduating.

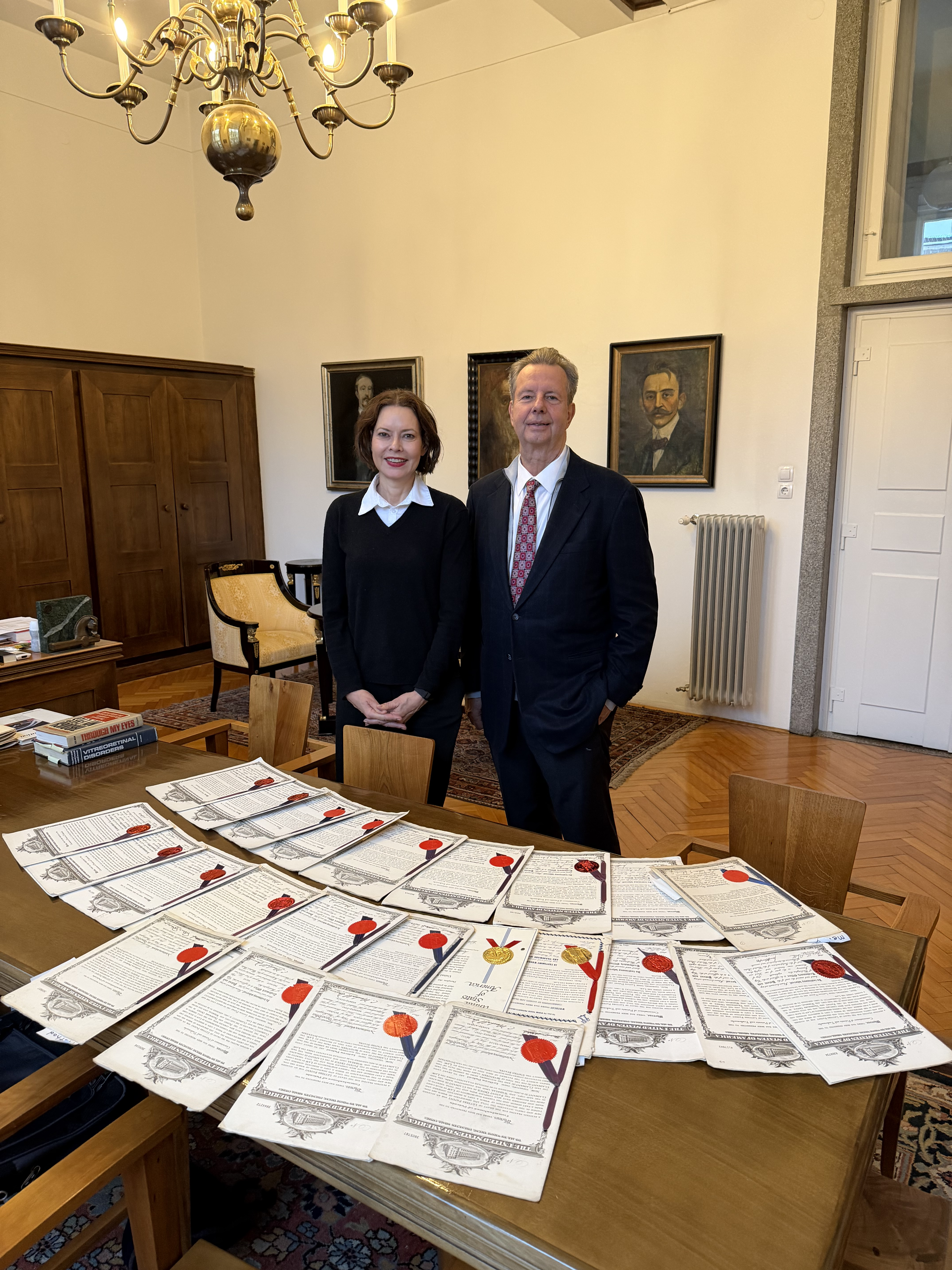
Anton Banko's original patents being donated to the National and University Library of Slovenia

In 1988, encouraged by his family, William Banko donated an Ocusystem to the Ljubljana Eye Clinic in Slovenia. The donation led to training visits by Slovenian ophthalmologists Dr. Primož Logar, Dr. Vladimir Pfeifer, and Dr. Marko Hawlina at Surgical Design. Following their training, they introduced modern phacoemulsification techniques at the Ljubljana Eye Clinic in 1989.

On December 10, 2025, Professor Dr. Marko Hawlina began organizing a permanent exhibit at the Ljubljana Eye Clinic dedicated to Anton Banko’s contributions to ophthalmic surgery. The exhibit includes an earlier model of the Ocusystem as well as the later Ocusystem Advantage, developed by Surgical Design with assistance from Marijan Kosak and his family, including his sons Marko and Marjan and daughter Mateja. The exhibit was designed by Marko Kosak.

Supporting documentation related to Anton Banko’s work, including original patents, technical drawings, and academic documents, has been archived at the National and University Library (NUK) in Ljubljana. Dr. Jana Kolar, director of NUK, accepted the materials for permanent preservation. The director of the Slovenian National Technical Museum, Natalija Polenec, also agreed to preserve the Ocusystem devices displayed at the Ljubljana Eye Clinic.
