= Phacoemulsification =

Method of cataract surgery

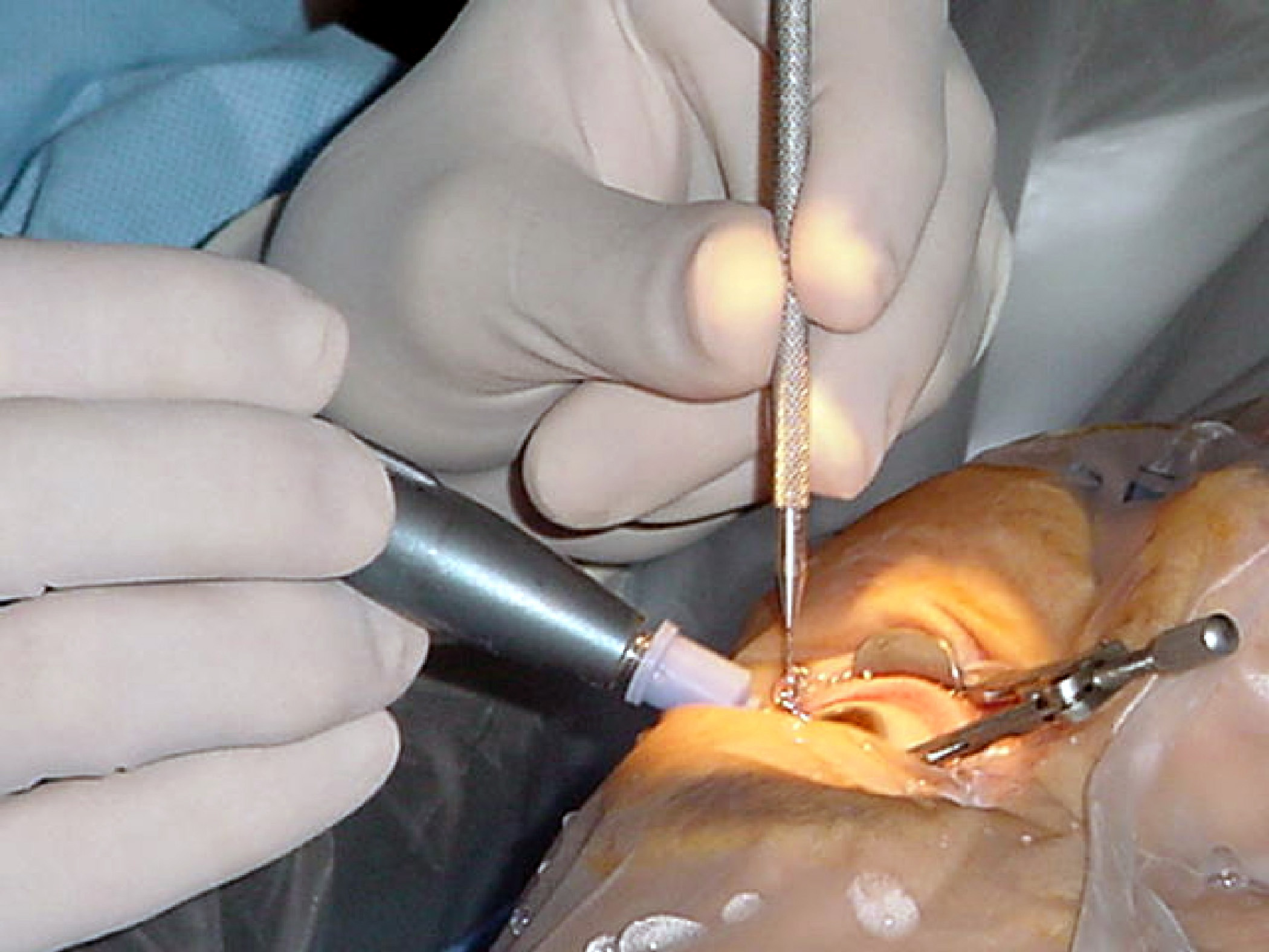
- Phacoemulsification: Cataract surgery, by a temporal approach, using a phacoemulsification probe (in right hand) and "chopper"(in left hand), being done under operating microscope at a United States Navy medical center
- ICD-9-CM: 13.41
- MeSH: D018918

Phacoemulsification is a cataract surgery method in which the internal lens of the eye which has developed a cataract is emulsified with the tip of an ultrasonic handpiece and aspirated from the eye. Aspirated fluids are replaced with irrigation of balanced salt solution to maintain the volume of the anterior chamber during the procedure. This procedure minimises the incision size and reduces the recovery time and risk of surgery-induced astigmatism.

It is best suited to relatively soft cataracts, where the ultrasonic energy required is moderate, and insertion of foldable intraocular prosthetic lenses, which take advantage of the small incision possible. It is the most common procedure for cataract removal in the developed world, with an excellent prognosis in uncomplicated cases.

== Etymology ==
The term originated from phaco- (Greek phako-, comb. form of phakós, lentil; see lens) + emulsification.

== Contraindications ==
The same general contraindications for cataract surgery apply. Specific contraindications for phacoemulsification include hard or dense cataracts where phacoemulsification is likely to cause permanent damage to the cornea.

== Mechanism ==
The phacoemulsification system comprises three sub-systems: Ultrasound, aspiration, and irrigation.

=== Ultrasound ===
The ultrasound component is used to break the lens down into particles small enough to be aspirated through the suction passages around the tip, which allows a very small incision for access. The incision is small enough that sutures are not needed for closure, and very little astigmatism is caused by healing of the wound in the cornea.

The phacoemulsification handpiece has a tip which vibrates longitudinally at a frequency in the range of 27 to 60 kHz, with a stroke length of 60 to 150 micrometres. Power is adjustable by the operator as a percentage of full power, and indicates a variation in nominal stroke length. Actual stroke length may vary slightly depending on the density of the material it contacts, though some instruments use feedback to maintain nominal stroke by adjusting current, voltage or frequency. Nominal frequency is not adjustable. Both efficiency and heat generation are increased with higher frequency, and 40 kHz is considered a good compromise and is in common use.

Most handpieces use piezoelectric crystals and the rest use magnetostrictive materials to generate the vibration.

The handpiece is hollow and usually accommodates an aspiration line, and the vibratory transducer components are sealed into it. The handpiece is designed and constructed to be autoclaved between uses.

The phaco tip is available in a variety of configurations, including a selection of tip angles to suit lens removal technique. Standard tip angles range between straight and 60 degrees, and more complex tips may have compound angles. The end of the tip may be round, ellipsoid, bent or flared. A variety of designs are intended to enhance cooling and irrigation, and to prevent burns.

There are three hypothesised mechanisms of how the nuclear material is emulsified. One proposes that the tip acts as a chisel and removes material on the forward stroke, another proposes that ultrasonic energy is somehow involved, and the third proposes that the tip causes microcavitation bubbles on the retraction stroke, which collapse to exert high pressures on the materials very close to the bubble, which cause them to disintegrate.

=== Aspiration ===
The aspiration system is used to remove the emulsified lens tissue as it is broken down by the tip. This may be done through the handpiece, with the inlet orifice around the vibrating tip, or through a separate aspiration tip, inserted through a smaller incision.

The pump of the phacoemulsification system can be a peristaltic type or a vacuum transfer type. In peristaltic pumps aspiration flow rate and vacuum are independent. Vacuum is the suction force which holds cataract nuclear fragments against the phaco tip so that they can be emulsified, and draws the emulsion into the tip. Vacuum is the relative low pressure generated by the pump removing liquids and gas from the suction side, and the pressure difference between the vacuum pump reservoir and the ambient pressure at the inlet to the tip of the handpiece draws fluids through the aspiration ducting. When the inlet is occluded by solid material, such as a cataract fragment, the pressure difference holds the solid in contact with the tip while the ultrasonic vibration breaks up the solid to fragments small enough to pass into the aspiration ducting and be carried away by a current of ambient fluid, which must be replaced as fast as it is removed, to retain internal pressure and shape of the eye.

=== Irrigation ===
The three purposes of irrigation are to maintain intraocular pressure, carry lens particles out of the eye in the aspiration system, and to cool the phaco handpiece. Gravity feed of 650mm water column (75.5mm Hg) is typical. At this supply pressure, fluid enters the anterior chamber at a rate proportional to the rate at which it leaves due to aspiration and leakage. The pressure head is adjusted to suit anatomical variations and the health of the eye. Complications are less likely if the volume and pressure of the globe are maintained during surgery. This requires a balance between fluid input and output, which is a balance between irrigation, aspiration and leakage. Repeated partial collapses of the anterior chamber, and iris fluttering during removal of the nucleus are signs of inadequate fluid supply, which can be adjusted by changing the height of the gravity feed supply bottle. A height of 650mm above the eye is usually enough to compensate outflow almost immediately. During emulsification, the abrupt variations in flow at the start and end of emulsification of each fragment can cause fluctuations in volume and pressure, which can be corrected by control of the aspiration foot pedal.

Sleeves for the phaco tip are standard accessories to insulate the wound surface from heat generated by the ultrasonic energy, and provide a route for irrigation.

== Preparation and precautions ==
=== Anaesthesia ===
Proper anesthesia is essential for ocular surgery. A facial nerve block may occasionally be performed to reduce lid squeezing. General anesthesia is recommended for children, traumatic eye injuries with cataract, for very apprehensive or uncooperative patients and animals. Cardiovascular monitoring is preferable in local anesthesia and is mandatory with general anesthesia.

Either topical, sub-tenon, peribulbar, or retrobulbar local anaesthesia is used, usually causing the patient little or no discomfort. Topical anaesthetics are most commonly used; these are placed on the globe of the eye as eyedrops before surgery or in the globe during surgery. Local-anaesthetic injection techniques include sub-conjunctival injections and injections behind the globe (retrobulbar block) to block regional nerves and prevent eye movement. Intravenous sedation may be combined with the local anaesthetic.

=== Site preparation ===
Proper sterile precautions are taken to prepare the area for surgery, including use of antiseptics like povidone-iodine. Sterile drapes, gowns and gloves are employed. A plastic sheet with a receptacle helps collect the fluids during phacoemulsification. An eye speculum is inserted to keep the eyelids open. The operation site is prepared by disinfection of the area around the eye and any other exposed area of the face, and exposure of the eyeball using an eyelid speculum;

== Surgical technique ==
Phacoemulsification and replacement with intraocular lens

The surgical procedure is typically performed under an operating microscope.

=== Incision ===
Before the phacoemulsification can be performed, one or more incisions are made in the eye to allow access for the surgical instruments. Entry into the eye is made through a minimal incision; the incision for cataract surgery has evolved along with the techniques for cataract removal and IOL placement. In phacoemulsification, the size depends on the requirements for IOL insertion. A more-posterior incision simplifies wound closure and decreases induced astigmatism but is more likely to damage blood vessels. With foldable IOLs, it is possible to use incisions smaller than 3.5 mm (0.14 in). The shape, position, and size of the incision affect the capacity for self sealing, the tendency to induce astigmatism, and the surgeon's ability to manoeuvre instruments through the opening. One or two smaller side-port incisions (paracentesis) at 60-to-90 degrees from the main incision augment access to the anterior chamber with additional instruments.

==== Coaxial ====
Coaxial phacoemulsification uses a single probe to irrigate, emulsify and aspirate, which is operated through a single incision.

==== Bimanual ====
Bimanual phacoemulsification uses one probe to emulsify and aspirate, and a second that is only used for irrigation. This technique was first used when more modern phacoemulsification handpieces made much less heat and therefore could be used without an irrigating sleeve. The sleeveless handpiece could be put in the eye with a smaller incision, potentially reducing induced astigmatism. The downside to the procedure when first adopted was that there were no IOLs available in the US which would fit through the smaller incision.

=== Maintaining the eye shape ===
Ophthalmic viscosurgical devices (OVDs), also known as viscoelastics, are injected into the anterior chamber to support, stabilize, and protect the eyeball to help maintain eye shape and volume during the procedure, and to distend the lens capsule during IOL implantation.

OVDs are used to protect the corneal endothelium from mechanical trauma and to maintain volume and form of the intraocular space during an open incision. The OVD is introduced into the space by syringe through a cannula.

Intraocular pressure is maintained by the irrigation with BSS, which is either done through the phaco handpiece, or through a separate cannula. The tendency is for a single phaco handpiece to be used, containing the ultrasonic tip, irrigation nozzle and aspiration intake clustered at the tip. The tip is inserted through the OVD, which reduces the loss by outflow at the incision, and this is further limited by small clearance around the tip where it passes through the cornea. Pressure is controlled by elevation of the saline bag above the level of the eye.

=== Capsulorhexis ===
To remove a cataract by extracapsular techniques, the capsule of the lens must be opened. In earlier intracapsular cataract extraction, the whole lens and capsule was removed at the same time. This was done to prevent the inflammatory response to leftover lens material. Since it was all removed en-bloc, there was no residual lens material. With effective aspiration practically all the material can be removed while leaving the posterior capsule membrane intact. This provides a barrier between the front and back chambers of the eye, and prevents the vitreous from moving forwards. It also provides the intraocular lens implant with the ideal place to be located in the eye, away from contact with other structures yet securely held in place.

The surgeon removes the anterior face of the capsule that contains the lens inside the eye, tearing a circular opening in the front surface of the lens capsule to access the lens within. A continuous curvilinear capsulorhexis is usually used to create a round, smooth-edged opening through which the lens nucleus can be removed or emulsified and the intraocular lens implant inserted. When done correctly, a CCC does not have any edge notches, and forces applied to the capsule during surgery are better distributed and less likely to result in a tear.

The usual method is to use a bent needle to begin a tear in the capsule, and then guide the edge of the tear around the anterior surface with either the same needle or Utratas forceps. There are advantages and disadvantages to both approaches, and most surgeons will use both instruments as the situation requires.

=== Preparation of the lens for emulsification ===
At this point, there are options. Either the nucleus can be separated from the cortex by hydrodissection and hydrodelineation, and then broken up, or the whole lens can be broken up in situ by the prechopping technique. The fragments are removed by emuslification and aspiration.

==== Prechopping ====
Cracking or prechop is sometimes used to break up the cataract before emulsification for more efficient fragment emulsification. Several methods can be used, based on the choice of instruments available and preference of the surgeon. Some are simple and do not require special or expensive equipment. In some methods a second steel instrument called a "chopper" is used from a side port (auxiliary incision) to help with breaking the nucleus into smaller pieces. The cataract is usually broken into two or four pieces before each piece is emulsified and aspirated.

The use of a modified cytostome with a Nagahara chopper is well suited to moderate density nuclei, and with experience can be used for soft or hard nuclei and through small pupils, but is less suitable for brunescent cataracts and loose capsules with zonular dialysis.

Other methods include bimanual twin instruments approaches for counter chopping, such as use of a cross-action cracking forceps, two modified cystotomes for middle prechop, the Fukasaku hydrochopping cannula, the Escaf ultrasonic ultrachopper, and the femtosecond laser. These prechop techniques allow surgeons to bypass the sculpting and chopping steps to fracture the nucleus, but require additional special instruments.

The ultrachopper is an ultrasonically powered blade similar to a phacoemulsifier needle but with a flattened blade which can be attached to the phaco handpiece. The mechanical action of the blade is augmented by the vibrations to cut hard and fibrous nuclear material easily. Tips can be selected to suit the cataract hardness.

==== Hydrodissection ====
When hydrodissection is used, the cataract's outer (cortical) layer is then separated from the capsule by a gentle, continuous flow or pulsed dose of liquid from a cannula, which is injected under the anterior capsular flap along the edge of the capsulorhexis opening. In hydrodelineation, fluid is injected into the body of the lens through the cortex against the nucleus of the cataract, which separates the hardened nucleus from the softer cortex shell by flowing along the interface between them. The smaller hard nucleus can then be more-easily emulsified. The posterior cortex serves as a buffer, protecting the posterior capsule membrane. The smaller size of the separated nucleus requires shallower and less-peripheral grooving, and produces smaller fragments after cracking or chopping. The posterior cortex also maintains the shape of the capsule, which reduces the risk of posterior capsule rupture.

=== Emulsification of the cataract ===
Nucleus emulsification makes it possible to aspirate the particles through a very small incision. After removing all hard central lens nucleus material by emulsification, the softer outer lens cortex is removed with suction only.

After nuclear cracking or chopping (if needed), the cataract is emulsified and aspirated. The nucleus or fragments of the nucleus are held against the phaco tip by suction, while the ultrasonic tip emulsifies the material in front of it. The resulting slurry is aspirated through the tip. This may be interrupted as necessary to reposition the tip or access another fragment. This process is continued until all of the nucleus has been removed.

The remaining lens cortex (outer layer of lens) material from the capsular bag is also carefully aspirated, using an irrigation-aspiration phaco probe or a bimanual system, while leaving the posterior capsule intact. If considered necessary, the remaining epithelial cells from the capsule are removed by capsular polishing.

Capsular polishing is the removal of lens epithelial cells remaining in the capsule after cataract removal. Capsule opacification can occur when these cells divide and form fibers. The capsular bag can be polished using metallic scrapers, silicone scrapers, Rentsch capsule curettes, an irrigation/aspiration tip, or the ultrasound irrigation/aspiration tip. A 1994 study found that the cleanest capsules were obtained by polishing with the ultrasound irrigation/aspiration tip.

=== Lens insertion ===
As with other cataract removal procedures, an intraocular lens implant (IOL) is usually placed into the remaining lens capsule ("in-the-bag" implantation). For implanting a rigid poly(methyl methacrylate) (PMMA) IOL, the incision has to be enlarged, so this is not usually done. For implanting a foldable IOL, the incision does not have to be enlarged. The foldable IOL, made of silicone or acrylic of appropriate power, is folded either using a holder/folder, or a proprietary insertion device provided along with the IOL. Because a smaller incision is sufficient, no stitches should be needed, and recovery time is usually shorter when using a foldable IOL.

Aligning the IOL in the correct axis to counteract astigmatism is necessary for a toric IOL. Sometimes, a ciliary sulcus implantation may be required because of posterior capsular tears or because of zonular dialysis.

=== Removal of OVDs ===
At the end of the procedure, OVDs that were injected to stabilize the anterior chamber, protect the cornea from damage, and distend the cataract's capsule during IOL implantation are removed from the eye to prevent post-operative viscoelastic glaucoma, a severe intra-ocular pressure increase. This is done via suction from the irrigation-aspiration instrument and replacement by buffered saline solution (BSS). Removal of OVDs from behind the implant reduces the risk and magnitude of postoperative pressure spikes or capsular distention.

=== Wound sealing ===
In the final step, the wound is sealed by elevating the pressure inside the globe with BSS, which presses the internal tissue against the external tissue of the incision, holding the incision closed. This should be sufficient to hold the wound closed and make a watertight seal, but if this does not achieve a satisfactory seal, a suture may be added. The wound is then hydrated with BSS, which causes corneal epithelial cells to expand and compress each other and helps seal the wound. The seal can be tested by drying the surface around it and pressing on the cornea.

=== Contingency procedures ===
Sometimes a change from a phacoemulsification procedure to extracapsular cataract extraction (ECCE) may be necessary. This may occur in the event of posterior capsule rupture, zonular dehiscence, (Note: Zonular dehiscence: Breaking of the fibrous strands (zonules) connecting the crystalline lens capsule to the ciliary body.) or a dropped nucleus (Note: Dropped nucleus: A cataract nucleus which has fallen through into the vitreous chamber.) with a nuclear fragment more than half the size of the cataract; problematic capsulorhexis with a hard cataract; or a very dense cataract where phacoemulsification is likely to cause permanent damage to the cornea.

== Complications ==
Complications can develop during and after surgery.

=== During surgery ===
Posterior capsular rupture, a tear in the posterior capsule of the natural lens, is the most-common complication during cataract surgery. Posterior capsule rupture can cause lens fragments to be retained, corneal oedema, and cystoid macular oedema; it is also associated with increased risk of endophthalmitis and retinal detachment.

Suprachoroidal hemorrhage is a rare complication.

Intraoperative floppy iris syndrome has an incidence of around 0.5% to 2.0%. Iris or ciliary body injury has an incidence of about 0.6%-1.2%. In the event of a posterior capsule rupture, fragments of the nucleus can find their way through the tear into the vitreous chamber; this is called posterior dislocation of nuclear fragments.

Other complications include failure to aspirate all lens fragments, leaving some in the anterior chamber; and incisional burns caused by overheating of the phacoemulsification tip.

=== After surgery ===
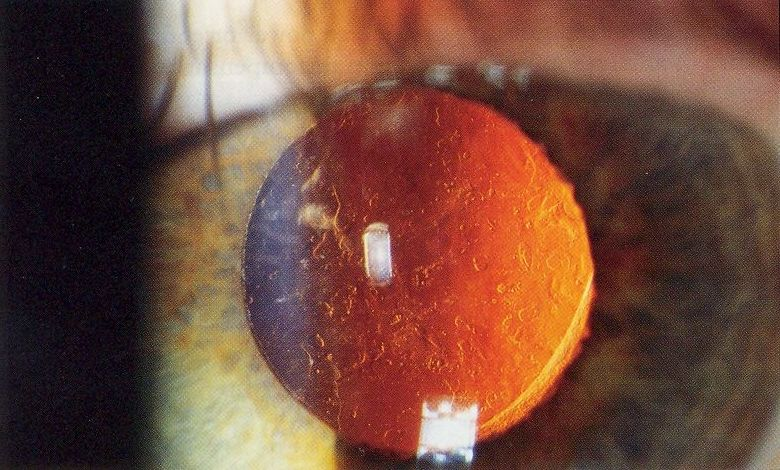
Slit lamp photo of IOL showing Posterior capsular opacification (PCO) visible a few months after implantation of intraocular lens in eye, seen on retroillumination

Complications after cataract surgery are relatively uncommon. Posterior vitreous detachment (PVD) may occur but does not directly threaten vision.

Some people develop a posterior capsular opacification (PCO), also called an after-cataract. This may compromise visual acuity, and can usually be safely and painlessly corrected using a laser. to create a clear central visual axis.

Patients who have had cataract surgery are at an increased risk of developing rhegmatogenous retinal detachment (RRD)—the most-common form of retinal detachment. Toxic anterior segment syndrome (TASS), a non-infectious inflammatory condition, may occur following cataract surgery.

Endophthalmitis is a serious infection of the intraocular tissues, usually following intraocular surgery complications or penetrating trauma, and one of the most-severe. It is rare in cataract surgery due to the use of prophylactic antibiotics. Hypopyon occurs about 80% of the time.

Glaucoma may occur and may be very difficult to control. It is usually associated with inflammation, especially when small fragments or chunks of the nucleus access the vitreous cavity.

Mechanical pupillary block can occur when contact between the edge of the pupil and an adjacent structure blocks the flow of aqueous through the pupil. This is more frequent as a complication of anterior chamber intraocular lens implantation, but has been known to occasionally occur with posterior IOL implantation.

Swelling of the macula, the central part of the retina, results in macular oedema and can occur a few days or weeks after surgery. Most such cases can be successfully treated. Uveitis–glaucoma–hyphema syndrome is a complication caused by the mechanical irritation of a mis-positioned IOL over the iris, ciliary body or iridocorneal angle.

Other possible complications include Elevated intraocular pressure; swelling or oedema of the cornea; displacement or dislocation of the IOL implant (rare); unplanned high refractive error—either myopic or hypermetropic—due to error in the ultrasonic biometry (measurement of the eye length and calculation of the required intraocular lens power); cyanopsia, in which the patient's vision tinted blue and often occurs for a few days, weeks or months after removal of a cataract; and floaters, which commonly appear after surgery.

== Recovery and rehabilitation ==
Following cataract surgery, side-effects such as grittiness, watering, blurred vision, double vision or a red or bloodshot eye may occur, and will usually clear after a few days. Full recovery can take four-to-six weeks. Patients are usually advised to avoid getting water in the eye during the first week after surgery, and to avoid swimming for two-to-three weeks as a conservative approach, to minimise risk of bacterial infection. Most patients can return to normal activities the day after phacoemulsification surgery. Patients should avoid driving for at least 24 hours after the surgery, largely due to possible swelling affecting focus, and pupil dilation causing excessive glare. At the first post-operative check, the surgeon will usually assess whether vision is suitable for driving.

With small-incision self-sealing wounds used with phacoemulsification, some of the post-operative restrictions common with intracapsular and extracapsular procedures are not relevant. Restrictions against lifting and bending were intended to reduce the risk of the wound opening, because straining increases intraocular pressure. With a self-sealing tunnel incision, however, higher pressure closes the wound more tightly. Routine use of a shield is not usually required because inadvertent finger pressure on the eye should not open a correctly structured incision, which should only open to point pressure. After surgery, to prevent contamination, the eyes should not be rubbed and the use of eye makeup, face cream or lotions should be avoided. Excessive dust, wind, pollen or dirt should also be avoided. Sunglasses should be worn on bright days because the eyes will be more sensitive to bright light for a while.

Topical anti-inflammatory drugs and antibiotics are commonly used in the form of eye-drops to reduce the risk of inflammation and infection. A shield or eye-patch may be prescribed to protect the eye while sleeping. The eye will be checked to ensure the IOL remains in place, and once it has fully stabilised, after about six weeks, vision tests will be used to check whether prescription lenses are needed. Where the focal length of the IOL is optimised for distance vision, reading glasses will generally be needed for near focus.

In some cases, the patient is dissatisfied with the optical correction provided by the initial implants, and removal and replacement is necessary. This can occur with more-complex IOL designs when patient expectations do not match with the compromises inherent in these designs, or the patient cannot accommodate the difference in distance and near-focusing of monovision lenses. The patient should not participate in contact or extreme sports or similar activities until cleared to do so by the eye surgeon.

== Outcomes ==
After full recovery, visual acuity depends on the underlying condition of the eye, the choice of IOL, and any long-term complications associated with the surgery. More than 90% of operations are successful in restoring useful vision, with a low complication rate. The World Health Organization (WHO) recommends at least 80% of eyes should have a presenting visual acuity of 6/6 to 6/18 (20/20 to 20/60) after surgery, which is considered a good visual outcome, and that with best correction this should be at least 90%. Acuity of between 6/18 and 6/60 (20/60 to 20/200) is regarded as borderline, and worse than 6/60 (20/200) is considered poor. Borderline or poor visual outcomes are usually due to pre-surgery conditions such as glaucoma, macular disease, and diabetic retinopathy.

A ten-year prospective survey on refractive outcomes from a UK National Health Service (NHS) cataract surgery service from 2006 to 2016 showed a mean absolute error between the targeted and outcome refraction of 0.50 dioptres, with a standard deviation of 0.67. 88.76% were within one diopter of target refraction and 62.36% within 0.50 dioptres.

In a 2009 study in Sweden, factors that affected predicted refraction error included sex, preoperative visual acuity, and glaucoma, and other eye diseases. Second-eye surgery, macular degeneration, age, and diabetes did not affect predicted outcome. Prediction error decreased with time, which is likely due to the use of improved equipment and techniques, including more-accurate biometry. An American survey of nearly two million bilateral cataract surgery patients published in 2013 found immediate sequential bilateral cataract surgery was statistically associated with worse visual outcomes than for delayed sequential bilateral cataract surgery; the difference was small and may not be clinically relevant.

== History ==
Charles Kelman and Anton Banko introduced phacoemulsification in 1967. Kelman had the idea to use ultrasonic vibrations after being inspired by his dentist's ultrasonic probe and collaborated with Banko who designed the first phacoemulsifier.

This method of surgery decreased the need for an extended hospital stay and made out-patient surgery the standard. Patients who undergo phacoemulsification rarely complain of pain or discomfort, although those who have topical anaesthesia rather than peribulbar block anaesthesia may experience some discomfort during the procedure.

A method of pre-chopping the cataract using the same bent cystotome needle used for capsulorhexis and a Nagahara chopper was described by Takayuki Akahoshi in 1998.

Recent advances in phacoemulsification technology involve combining the ultrasonic and irrigation-aspiration sleeve into a single handpiece with disposable tip sleeves. This design reduces manufacturing costs, eliminates the risk of infection and provides better surgical outcomes.

== Research ==
Use of ultrasound in phacoemulsification can cause effects such as corneal edema, and macular edema after surgery. However, in some cases, use of ultrasound energy does not generate macular edema. The cause of macular edema in phacoemulsification is intraocular pressure fluctuation during surgery. Intraocular fluctuation can create micro bubbles and generate micro emboli in macular vessels that can cause micro ischemia in the retinal nerve fiber layer (RNFL).

A Cochrane Review seeking to determine whether glaucoma surgery combined with cataract surgery via phacoemulsification has any advantages over cataract surgery (via phacoemulsification) alone, found that eyes that underwent combined (glaucoma and phacoemulsification) surgery had a significantly lower intraocular pressure (-1.62 mmHg) compared to eyes that underwent phacoemulsification cataract surgery alone. The authors note that this finding is not conclusive, as the studies examined had many differences and poor reporting outcomes.

A Cochrane Review of 42 trials seeking to compare the effectiveness of laser-assisted cataract surgery with standard ultrasound phacoemulsification found uncertain evidence suggesting benefits of one procedure over the other. A meta-analysis of more than 14500 eyes and 37 studies found no significant differences between the two techniques in terms of visual or refractive outcomes or overall complications.

In a Cochrane Review, clinical trials comparing NSAIDs versus corticosteroids in the treatment of postoperative eye inflammation were uncertain, but there was some evidence suggesting patients treated with NSAIDs were less likely to develop cystoid macular edema.

== See also ==
- Africa Cataract Project – Turkish non-governmental organization
- Eye surgery – Surgery performed on the eye or its adnexa
- Himalayan Cataract Project – U.S. nonprofit organization
- Hydrodissection – Surgically separating tissues using a flow of water
- IOLVIP – Intraocular lens system to compensate for macular degeneration
- Ophthalmology – Field of medicine treating eye disorders
