= Capsulorhexis =

Tearing an opening in the lens capsule during cataract surgery

- Other names: capsulorrhexis; continuous curvilinear capsulorrhexis/ capsulorhexis/ capsulotomy/ capsulectomy; continuous circular capsulorrhexis/ capsulorhexis/ capsulotomy/ capsulectomy
- ICD-9-CM: 13
- MeSH: D019923

Capsulorhexis or capsulorrhexis, and the commonly used technique known as continuous curvilinear capsulorhexis (CCC), is a surgical technique used to remove the central anterior part of the capsule of the lens from the eye during cataract surgery by shear and tensile forces. It generally refers to removal of the central part of the anterior lens capsule, but in situations like a developmental cataract a part of the posterior capsule is also removed by a similar technique.

In order to remove a cataract by extracapsular techniques, the capsule of the lens must be opened. In earlier intracapsular cataract extractions, the whole lens and capsule were removed at the same time. This was done to prevent the inflammatory response to leftover lens material. Since it was all removed en-bloc, there was no residual lens material. With effective aspiration practically all the material can be removed while leaving the posterior capsule intact. This provides a barrier between the front and back chambers of the eye, and prevents the vitreous from moving forwards. It also provides the artificial intraocular lens with the ideal place to be located in the eye, away from contact with other structures yet securely held in place.

Prior to the advent of the CCC, a "can opener" approach was used for capsulorhexis, with a small bent needle making small incisions around the anterior surface of the lens, forming a roughly continuous cut hole in the capsule that the lens could be removed through. However, the ragged edges were stress raisers and could promote a tear that could proceed outwards. A CCC when done correctly, does not have any edge notches, and forces applied to the capsule during surgery are better distributed and less likely to result in a tear.

The usual method is to use the same bent needle to begin a tear in the capsule, and then guide the edge of the tear around the anterior surface with either the same needle or Utratas forceps. There are advantages and disadvantages to both approaches, and most surgeons will use both instruments as the situation requires.

In children younger than 7 years, in addition to the anterior capsulorhexis, a posterior capsulorhex is commonly made, since the posterior capsule becomes cloudy even more commonly in children than adults. Since a simple office procedure using a Nd:YAG laser commonly performed on adults is difficult with a child (since they cannot sit still at the machine), it is better to deal with the posterior capsule at the time of surgery. Since the vitreous in children is much more stable, the loss of vitreous is less common (since as a solid it stays put), though often an anterior vitrectomy is still performed.

== History ==
Continuous curvilinear capsulorhexis is a technique that was pioneered by Thomas Neuhann and Howard Gimbel, and is in common use as it has a low risk of initiating further outward tears in the capsule, and does not require complex or expensive instruments.
