= Vitrectomy =

Surgery to remove vitreous humor from the eye

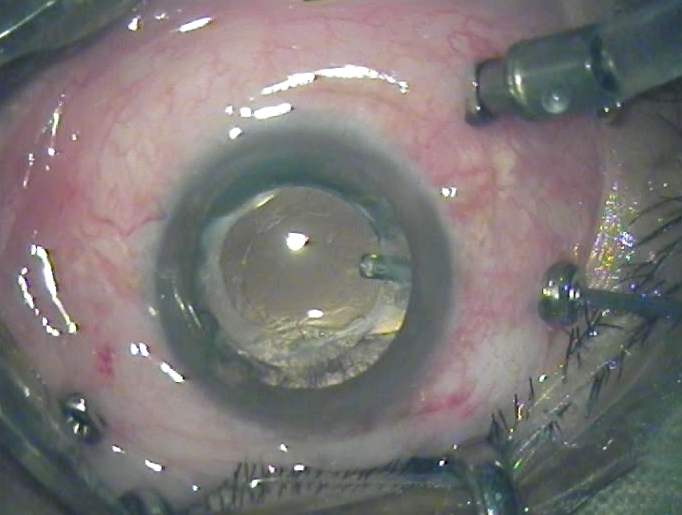
- Three port 23-gauge vitrectomy
- ICD-9-CM: 14.73-14.74
- MeSH: D014821

Vitrectomy is a surgery to remove some or all of the vitreous humor from the eye.

Anterior vitrectomy entails removing small portions of the vitreous humor from the front structures of the eye—often because these are tangled in an intraocular lens or other structures.

Pars plana vitrectomy is a general term for a group of operations accomplished in the deeper part of the eye, all of which involve removing some or all of the vitreous humor—the eye's clear internal jelly.

Even before the modern era, some surgeons performed crude vitrectomies. Dutch surgeon Anton Nuck (1650–1692) claimed to have removed vitreous by suction in a young man with an inflamed eye. In Boston, John Collins Warren (1778–1856) performed a crude limited vitrectomy for angle closure glaucoma.

== Anesthesia for vitrectomy ==
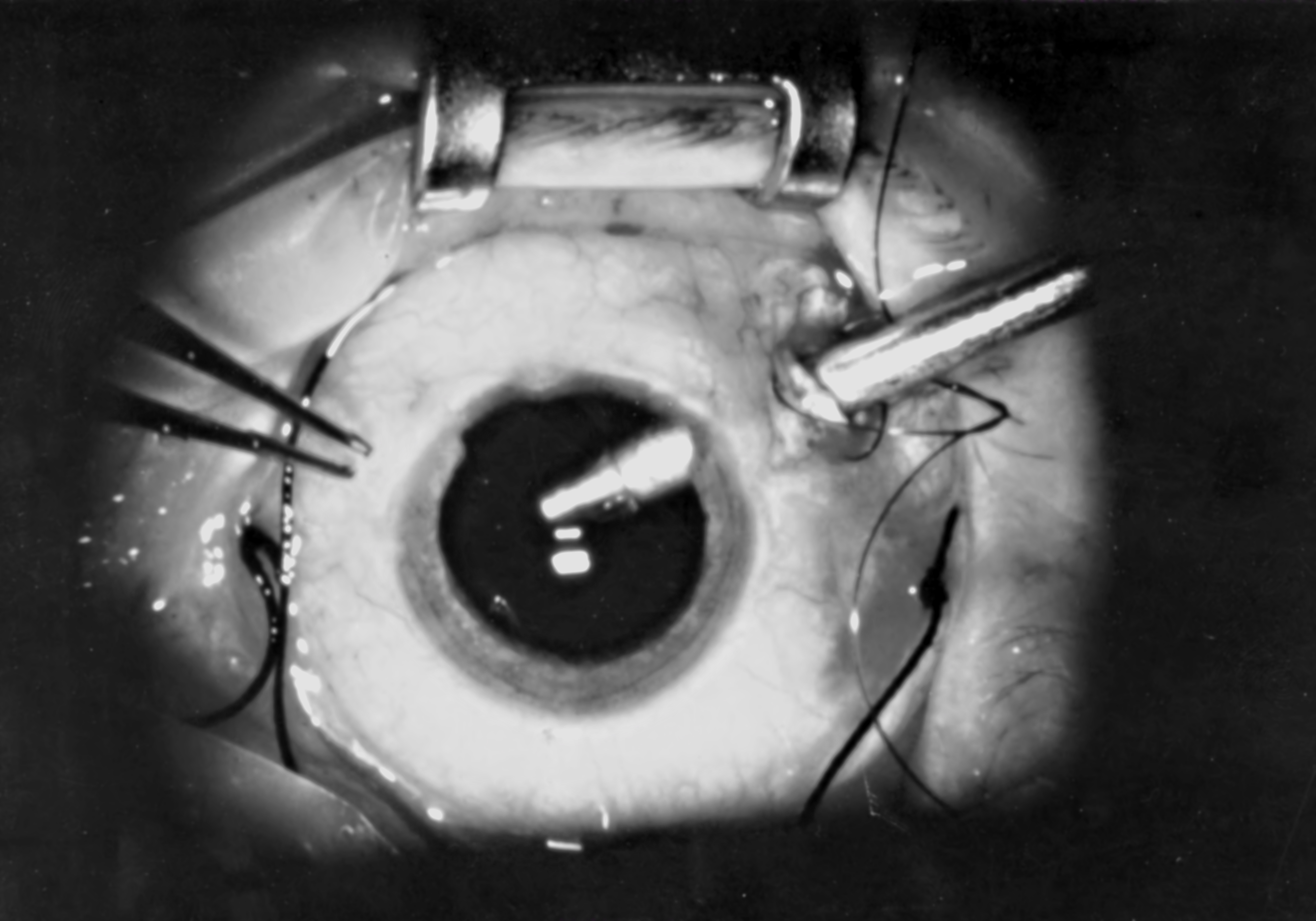
Single port 19-gauge vitrectomy

Options for anesthesia for vitrectomy are general anaesthesia, local anesthesia, topical anesthesia and intracameral lidocaine irrigation.

Each anesthesia technique has its advantages and disadvantages, and the selection of anesthesia will depend on various factors including the surgeon's and patient's choice, disease and additional surgical steps required.

== Pars plana vitrectomy ==
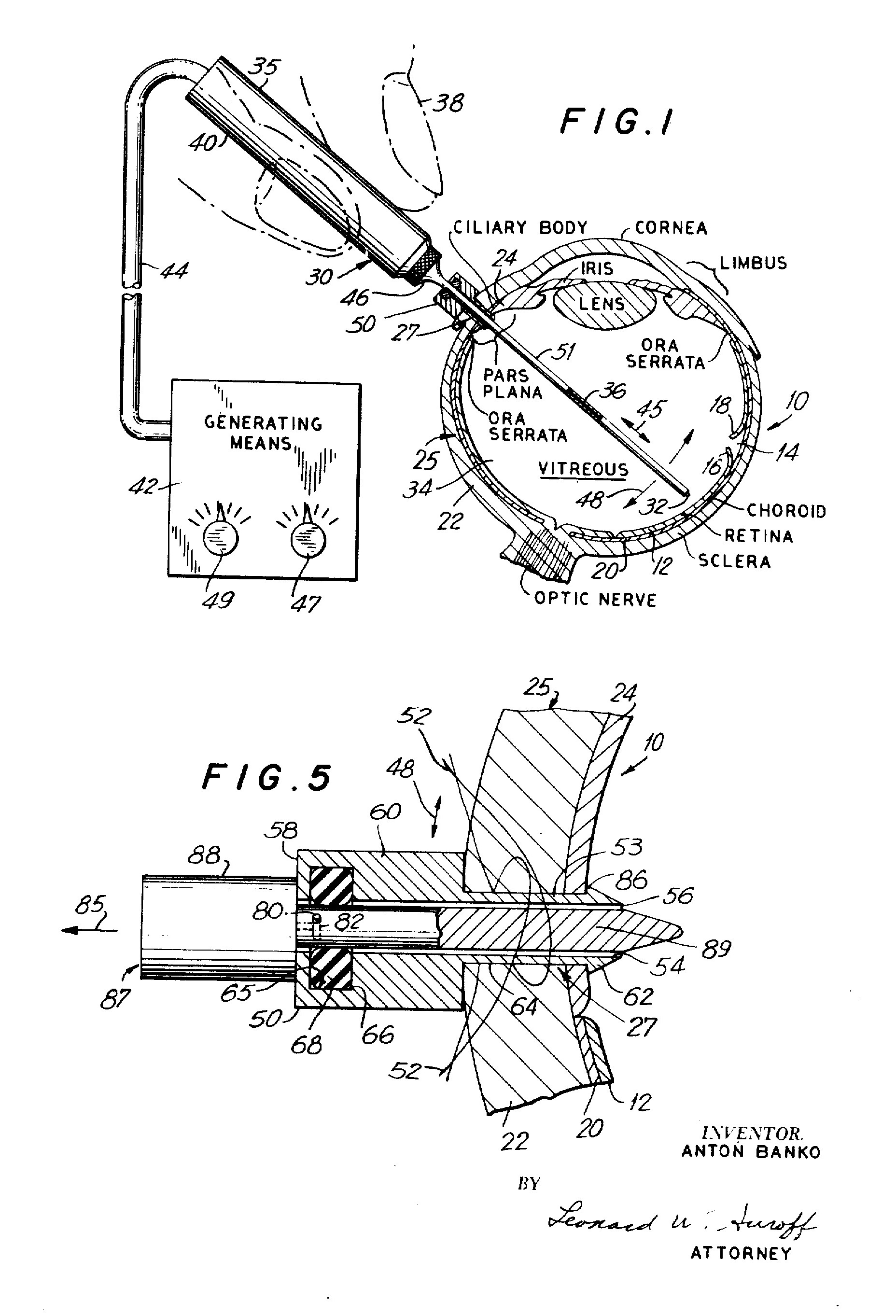
Anton Banko's 1968 U.S. patent drawings for the original pars plana vitrectomy instrumentation

Although Robert Machemer has historically been credited with developing pars plana vitrectomy, Anton Banko patented the procedure for closed vitrectomy in 1968, predating Machemer's first reported operation by three years. Machemer performed the first reported human closed pars plana vitrectomy in 1970, and subsequently helped establish the technique as a standard approach to vitreous surgery.

The original purpose of vitrectomy was to remove clouded vitreous humor—usually containing blood. The success of these first procedures led to the development of techniques and instruments to peel scar tissue (membranectomy) off the light sensing nerves of the posterior eye (the retina) and to provide space for materials injected in the eye. It also made space for surgeons to inject gases or liquid silicone necessary to reattach the retina. It also increase the efficacy of other surgical procedures such as scleral buckle.

The development of new instruments and surgical strategies through the 1970s and 1980s was spearheaded by surgeon and engineer Steve Charles. More recent advances have included smaller and more refined instruments for use in the eye, the injection of various medications at the time of surgery to manipulate a detached retina into its proper position and mark the location of tissue layers to allow their removal, and for long term protection against scar tissue formation. Several technologies and systems exist to perform vitrectomy.

== Additional surgical steps ==
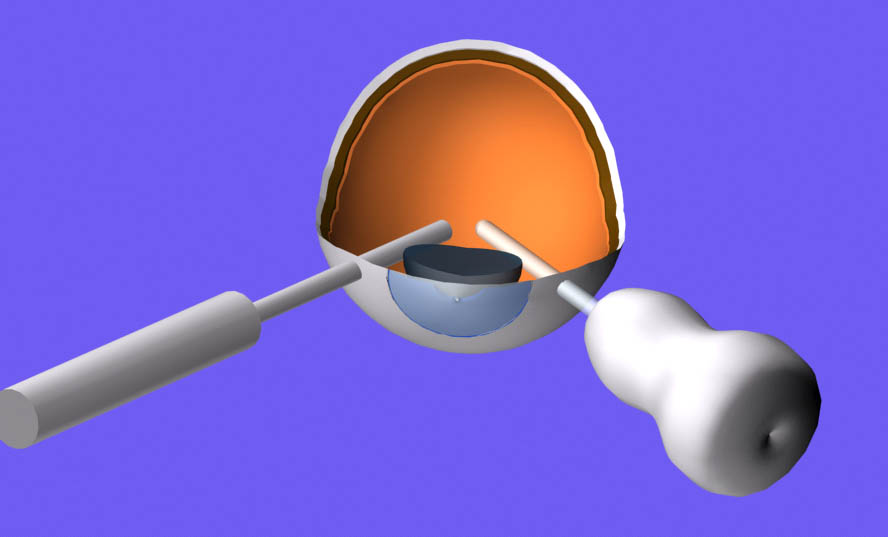
Vitrectomy instruments

Additional surgical steps involved as part of modern vitrectomy surgeries may include:

Membranectomy – removal of layers of unhealthy tissue from the retina with minute instruments such as forceps (tiny grasping tools), picks (miniature hooks), and visco-dissection (separating layers of tissue with jets of fluid.) This layer of unhealthy tissue is called an epiretinal membrane and it can occur in anyone, but is more likely to occur in the elderly or in people who have had prior eye disease or eye surgery. If the patient has an epiretinal membrane and is also complaining of symptoms such as decreased visual acuity, then a membranectomy is performed in addition to the vitrectomy. Complications of this additional step are similar to complications of the standard vitrectomy procedure.

Fluid/air exchange – injection of air into the eye to remove the intraocular fluid from the posterior segment of the globe while maintaining intraocular pressure to temporarily hold the retina in place or seal off holes in the retina. The air pressure is temporary as the posterior segment will soon re-fill with fluid.

Air/gas exchange – In some cases, gas can be used to help hold the retina in place. Gas, or more typically mixed gas and air, is injected through the sclera and into the posterior segment of the globe. This procedure is often referred to as pneumatic retinopexy. Typical gases used are perfluoropropane or sulfur hexafluoride. The gases are mixed with air to neutralize their expansive properties to provide for a longer acting (than air alone) retinal tamponade. The retinal tamponade acts to hold the retina in place or temporarily seal off holes in the retina. The mixed gases disappear spontaneously once they have accomplished their purpose and the posterior segment re-fills with fluid.

Silicone oil injection – Similar to an air/gas exchange, or pneumatic retinopexy, the eye can also be filled with liquid silicone to hold the retina in place. In contrast to the pneumatic retinopexy, however, the silicone oil remains in the eye until it is later removed surgically. Oils have less surface tension and buoyancy than gases so the tension exerted by the oil is about 30 times less than that of the gas.

Photocoagulation – In cases when there is a tear in the retina, or when there are unhealthy damaging blood vessels (which can be seen in patients with diabetic retinopathy), laser treatment can be used. In such cases, the laser is used to seal the hole or prevent growth of the unhealthy, damaging blood vessels.

Scleral buckling – placement of a support positioned like a belt around the eyeball to maintain the retina in a proper, attached position. This is referred to as an "exoplant". Placement of the scleral buckle for patients who have had a retinal detachment has been shown to lead to reattachment approximately 80 to 90 percent of the time after one surgery. In cases of failure, most patients are treated with vitrectomy.

Lensectomy – In some cases, a lensectomy, or "cataract surgery", is done in conjunction with the vitrectomy. This extra procedure is performed when the lens of eye is cloudy (cataract), damaged during the vitrectomy, if there is attached to scar tissue, or if the pressure in the eye needs to be lowered (as in the case with some glaucomatous patients).

== Indications ==
Conditions which can benefit from vitrectomy include:

Retinal detachment – a blinding condition where the lining of the eye peels loose and floats freely within the interior of the eye. Steps to reattach the retina may include vitrectomy to clear the inner jelly, scleral buckling to create a support for the reattached retina, membranectomy to remove scar tissue, injection of dense liquids to smooth the retina into place, photocoagulation to bond the retina back against the wall of the eye, and injection of a gas or silicone oil to secure the retina in place as it heals.

Macular pucker – formation of a patch of unhealthy tissue in the central retina (the macula) distorting vision. Also called epiretinal membrane. After vitrectomy to remove the vitreous gel, membranectomy is undertaken to peel away the tissue.

Diabetic retinopathy – may damage sight by either a non-proliferative or proliferative retinopathy. The proliferative type is characterized by formation of new unhealthy, freely bleeding blood vessels within the eye (called vitreal hemorrhage) and/or causing thick fibrous scar tissue to grow on the retina, detaching it. Often diabetic retinopathy is treated in early stages with a laser in the physician's office to prevent these problems. When bleeding or retinal detachment occur, vitrectomy is employed to clear the blood, membranectomy removes scar tissue, and injection of gas or silicone with scleral buckle may be needed to return sight. Diabetics should have an eye exam yearly.

Macular holes – the normal shrinking of the vitreous humor with aging can occasionally tear the central retina causing a macular hole with a blind spot blocking sight.

Vitreous hemorrhage – bleeding in the eye from injuries, retinal tears, subarachnoid hemorrhages (as Terson syndrome), or blocked blood vessels. Once blood is removed, photocoagulation with a laser can shrink unhealthy blood vessels or seal retinal holes.

Vitreous floaters – deposits of various size, shape, consistency, refractive index, and motility within the eye's normally transparent vitreous humor which can obstruct vision. Here pars plana vitrectomy has been shown to relieve symptoms. Because of possible side effects, it is used only in severe cases.

== Complications ==
There are a few complications that can result from vitrectomy surgery. Cataract is the most frequent complication. Many patients will develop a cataract within the first few years after surgery. Because there have been no published controlled trials evaluating the benefits and risks stemming from post vitrectomy cataract surgery, ophthalmologists have no clear evidence to rely upon when counseling patients about cataract surgery.

Other common complications include high intraocular pressure, bleeding in the eye, and retinal edema, swelling in the back of the eye. In most cases, the retinal edema can be managed with over-the-counter medication. In severe cases, this swelling can be treated with intra-ocular injections.

More severe complications after a vitrectomy are endophthalmitis (inflammation of the fluids in the eye) or suprachoroidal hemorrhage (bleeding above the choroidal layer of the eye). Rates of these complications have been reported to be less than 0.5%.

Lastly, although vitrectomy surgery is often done to correct retinal detachments, a subsequent retinal detachment is a possible complication as well. Rates of retinal detachment have been reported to be less than 5%.

== Recovery ==
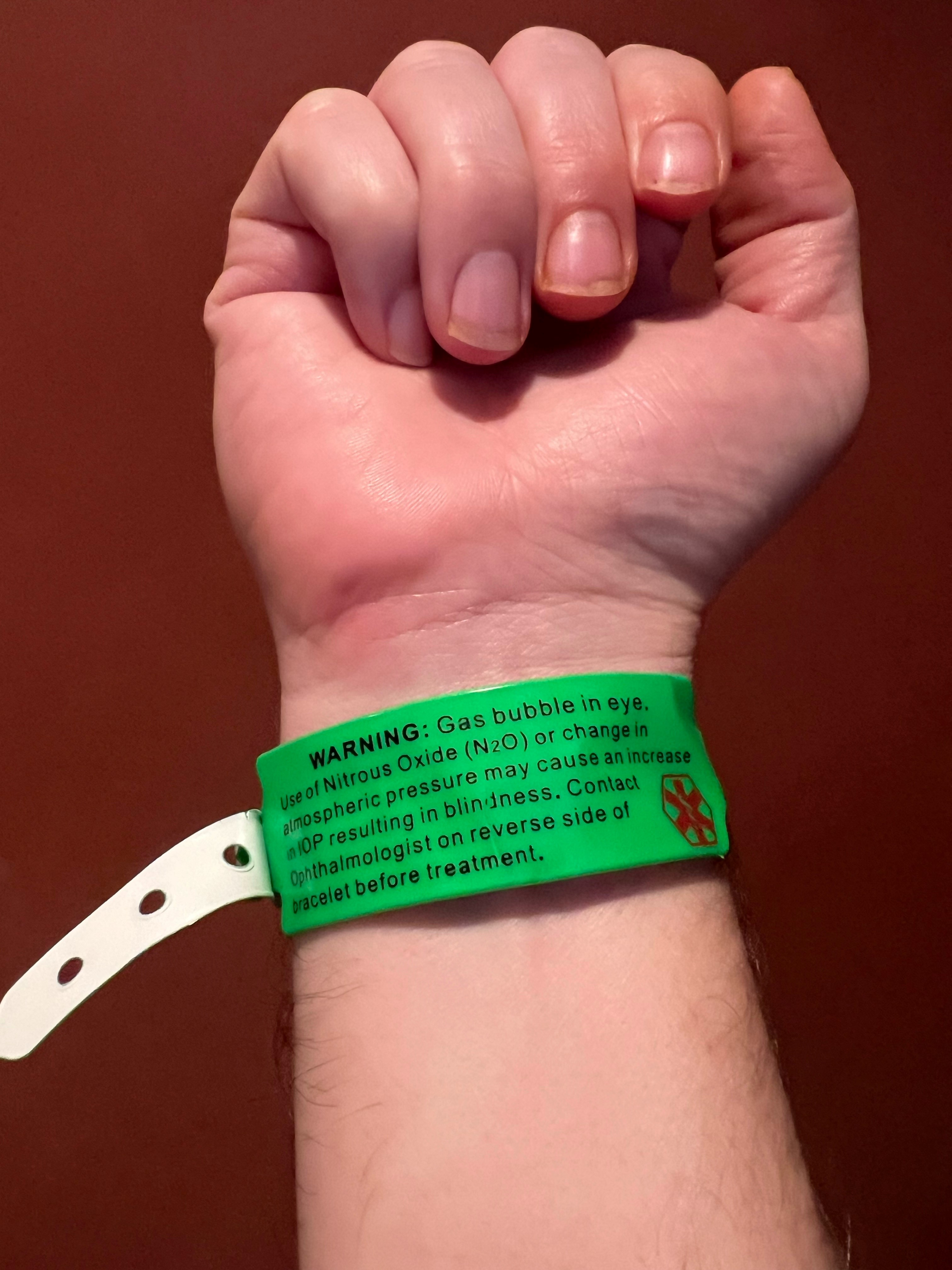
A wristband that provides a warning regarding risks after vitrectomy

Patients use eye drops for several weeks, or longer, to allow the surface of the eye to heal. In some cases, heavy lifting is avoided for a few weeks.

A gas bubble may be placed inside the eye, to keep the retina in place. If a gas bubble is used, sometimes a certain head positioning (posturing) has to be maintained, such as face down or sleeping on the right or left side. The gas bubble will dissolve over time, but this takes several weeks. Flying should be avoided while the gas bubble is still present.

Problems such as return of the original condition, bleeding, or infection from the surgery may require additional treatment or can result in blindness. If the patient needs to remain face down after surgery, a vitrectomy support system can be rented, to help aid during the recovery time. This particular equipment may be used for as little as five days to as long as three weeks. A Cochrane review found that in one study, cataract surgery was needed within two years for about half of the eyes operated on for idiopathic macular hole, and retinal detachment was found in about one in 20 eyes.

== Outcome ==
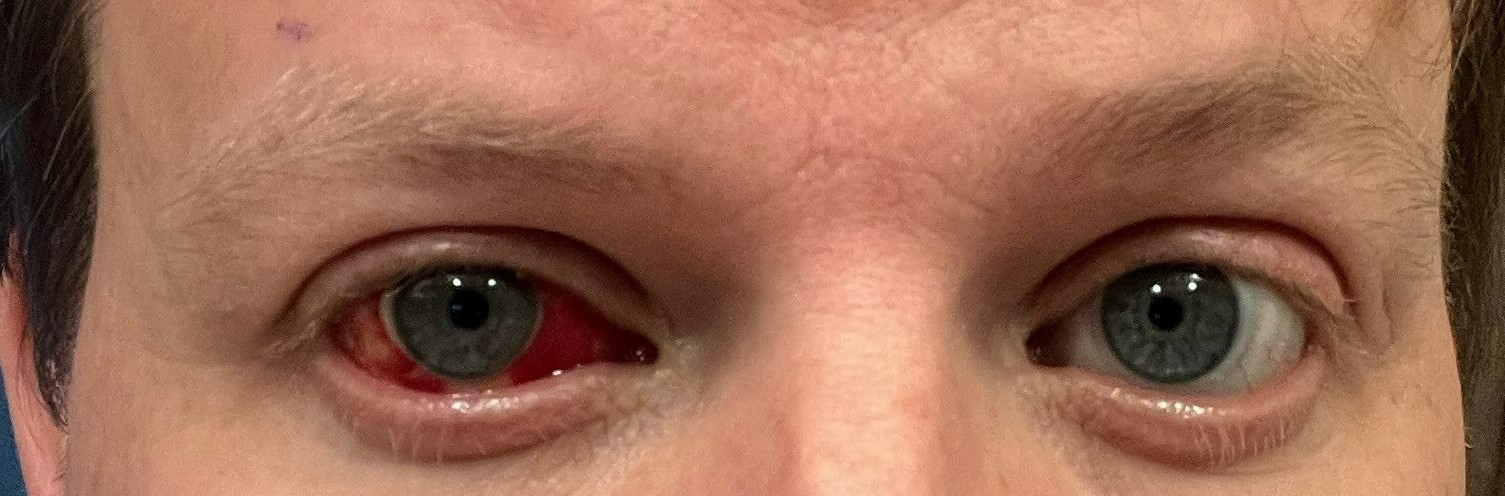
Showing eyes shortly after vitrectomy and removal of bandages

The return of eyesight after vitrectomy depends on the underlying condition which prompted the need for surgery. It also depends on patient age and their visual acuity before surgery. For example, if the eye is healthy, but filled with blood, then vitrectomy can result in return of 20/20 eyesight. With more serious problems, such as a retina which has detached several times, final sight may be only sufficient to safely walk (ambulatory vision) or less.

With a retinal detachment, some very important considerations are how long the retina has been detached, and what part of the retina was detached. For example, if the macula of the retina comes off too, outcomes might not be as good as they would if the macula was still attached. Also, the longer the time between the detachment and the reattachment, the worse the outcomes. Some ophthalmologists believe that if a patient has a retinal detachment that involves the macula and it has been longer than 6 months, then a vitrectomy for that patient is unlikely to help. However, recent studies have shown that visual improvement might still be found in these patients. Given the high variability between outcomes for different patients with retinal detachments, it is very important to be examined by an ophthalmologist as soon as possible.

A Cochrane review found vitrectomy for patients with idiopathic macular hole improved visual acuity by about 1.5 lines on an acuity chart. Macular hole closure was 76% in those treated with vitrectomy compared to 11% in those observed.

== Cultural references ==
In 1996, Spalding Gray, an American actor, screenwriter and playwright, released Gray's Anatomy, a film monologue describing his experiences dealing with a macular pucker and his decision to undergo surgery.

== See also ==
- Eye surgery
- List of surgeries by type
