= Helmut Machemer =

German soldier and researcher

- Machemer writing a letter from a dug-out in Russia (1941/42)
- Born: 7 May 1903; Sprendlingen
- Died: 18 May 1942 (aged 39)
- Spouse: Erna
- Children: Robert Machemer; Hans Machemer; Peter Machemer
- Military career
- Allegiance: Nazi Germany
- Branch: German Army
- Service years: 1939–1942
- Rank: Unterarzt
- Unit: 16th Panzer Division
- Conflicts: World War II: Battle of France; Operation Barbarossa
- Awards: Iron Cross, Second Class; Iron Cross, First Class; Wound Badge

Helmut Machemer (7 May 1903 – 18 May 1942) was a German ophthalmologist who served as "Truppenarzt" with the rank of "Unterarzt", corresponding to the rank of sergeant. He worked with Professor Aurel von Szily in Münster during the 1930s and, with him, pioneered an electrical treatment for retinal detachment.

After Nazi Germany passed the Nuremberg Laws in 1935, Machemer and his wife began experiencing more serious discrimination as, under these laws and due to her mother's Jewish ancestry, his wife was classified as a Mischling (or "mixed-race") and her rights were restricted. He joined the German army at the outbreak of the Second World War in the hope of winning a first class Iron Cross bravery medal. Machemer hoped this would allow his family to be reclassified as being of "German-blood". He fought in France and Russia, was wounded in action and won both the Iron Cross 1st Class and Iron Cross 2nd Class. Machemer was killed in action at the Second Battle of Kharkov on 18 May 1942, just four days after being notified of the first class award. His wife and children were granted German-blood status in March 1943. Machemer kept extensive written, photographic and film records of his wartime service and these have been published in a book and documentary film.

== Early life and career ==
Helmut Machemer was born on 7 May 1903 in Sprendlingen and spent much of his early life in Münster. He studied medicine at the Universities of Heidelberg, München and Freiburg. In 1929 in Freiburg, he worked on a doctorate (on amphibian development) under the supervision of Prof. Hans Spemann (later Nobel prize winner) and was promoted Nov. 1929 to Dr. phil. nat. In December 1930, he, in addition, was promoted to Dr. med. at the University of Freiburg. He afterwards worked at an eye clinic in Münster under Professor Aurel von Szily. Machemer dated Erna Schwalbe, who studied medicine at the University of Kiel, from 1929. In June 1932, Erna became aware that she might have Jewish ancestry, which she knew could be an issue due to the rise of the anti-Semitic Nazi Party. Erna's father wrote her a letter which confirmed her mother's ancestry, which he had tried to keep hidden. Erna immediately offered to separate from Machemer, but he refused to do so on the grounds that he loved her and they married in October 1932. Erna's mother divorced her father and moved to the Netherlands the following year, after the Nazis came to power. Machemer joined the Sturmabteilung Nazi paramilitary in 1933 out of a sense of patriotism, he was expelled in 1937 due to his wife's ancestry.

Machemer was described by medical historian George Gorin as "a capable retinal surgeon". In 1934, he pioneered, with Szily, a method of treating retinal detachment by use of an electric current to form a chorioretinal scar. Anti-Semitic discrimination escalated under the Nazis and Szily, as a Jew, was forced from his position at the clinic, with Machemer also losing his job there. Erna was also forced to abandon her medical studies. Machemer was unable to set up his own practice as the Association of Statutory Health Insurance Physicians refused to grant a permit because of his marriage. The Machemers considered divorce or emigration, but Szily found Helmut a position as assistant to ophthalmologist in Stadtlohn.

The Machemers, along with their three sons, moved to Dufkampstrasse, Stadtlohn, in 1935. In October of that year, the Nazis passed the Nuremberg Laws; these defined Nazi racial classifications and the rights of each and forbade marriage between those of "German blood" and those of Jewish ancestry. Under these laws, Machemer's wife was classified as "mixed-race" and "half-Jewish" and the family became subject to much more stringent restrictions and discrimination. Machemer was not a supporter of the Nazi Party, but was also not an opponent of the regime. Machemer obtained from the Reich Medical Association in 1939, an exemption to the racial restictions that allowed him to establish a medical practice in Stadtlohn.

== Second World War ==
Machemer was 36 years old when the Second World War began with the German invasion of Poland on 1 September 1939. He was unlikely to be drafted due to his age but volunteered for service on the first day of the war. Machemer volunteered in an attempt to make use of a little-known exception in the Nazi racial laws: that the "non-Aryan" family of an Aryan could be classified as being of "German blood", if the man made a significant contribution to the Nazi state. Machemer became convinced that if he was awarded the Iron Cross first class and the Infantry Assault Badge for bravery on the battlefield then he could secure the reclassification of his family.

Machemer served during the 1940 invasion of France and the 1941 invasion of Russia, in which he served as an Unterarzt (medical officer aspirant) of the reconnaissance unit of the 16th Panzer Division. For his part in the latter operation he was awarded the second class Iron Cross. At one point he worked in a captured Soviet hospital, operating on captured Russian soldiers. Whilst in action Machemer was shot in the neck, but after checking it was not serious, returned to duty treating soldiers who had been shot through the lungs. He noted this in a letter home to his wife and Erna's reply was that he "shouldn't consciously put yourself in danger again, it seems to me like a challenge to fate". Helmut also wrote to Erna of his concern that he might be withdrawn from the front line and placed in a field hospital where he would be unlikely to be recommended for a bravery award.

Machemer was of the opinion that he would not be recommended for the Iron Cross, first class unless he held the position of medical officer. This promotion had been previously denied to him due to his marriage to Erna. Machemer appealed the decision in March 1942 and requested promotion to the rank of Oberarzt. After sending a family tree and confirmation that Erna had no contact with her Jewish relation he was approved for the Iron Cross, first class on 14 May 1942. Machemer records that he celebrated this decision with champagne and, the next day had a hangover.

Machemer was killed at mid-day 18 May, while on a trip to screen the battlefield for wounded soldiers. He was hit in head by shrapnel from an artillery shell while travelling in a vehicle during the Second Battle of Kharkov. Machemer was travelling in a car at the time, his companion was heavily wounded, but survived. Machemer, who was 39 when he died, recorded in his final diary entry of 18 May that he had slept well and was awaiting orders. On 3 March 1943 Erna and her children were granted "German-blood" status by a decree personally signed by Adolf Hitler. This is believed to be the only known case of such an exemption.

== Legacy ==
As a scientist, he wished to document his and his company's way through wartime. His partly critical writings would have been unacceptable for promotion by the Nazi party and may have placed him at risk of arrest and he would not have been able to accomplish his mission. His collection included more than 160 letters, 2,000 photographs and five hours of film footage. Some of the records included depictions of dead German soldiers, dead civilians, burnt houses and dead horses. The majority of Machemer's reports and private letters were sent via "Feldpost" through the postal service. A few of the documents are known to be lost, since they were numerated. In particular, exposed photos and films, were carried home by comrades.

Machemer's documents were kept by Erna and passed onto the couple's son, Hans. Hans worked with historian Christian Hardinghaus to catalogue and assess the material and also produced a documentary film and a book, Wofür es lohnte, das Leben zu wagen ("What it was worth risking life for") published 2018 in German by Europa Verlag. Hardinghaus also produced a novel based on the story (Ein Held dunkler Zeit) telling the story of Wilhelm Möckel, a doctor with the 16th Panzer Division, and his wife Annemarie.

Erna continued to live in Stadtlohn after the war, until she moved back to Münster in 1962. Erna died in 1970. Besides Hans the other sons were Peter and Robert Machemer (1933–2009), also an ophthalmologist and sometimes called the "father of modern retinal surgery".

Hans Machemer appeared in the BBC documentary "Lost home movies of Nazi Germany" explaining his father's self-sacrifice, through film footage taken by Helmut himself.
