= Hydrodissection =

Surgically separating tissues using a flow of water

Hydrodissection is the use of a directed jet of water to surgically separate tissues. It is generally used to develop tissue planes or divide soft tissues with less trauma than dissection using a cutting instrument. By using an appropriate pressure it will tend to follow the path of least resistance that is close to the direction of the jet.

(Simple language) Although the pressure can separate a litle the attached tissues, what really does the hydrodissection is the chemical reaction cause by fibrosis sclerosis. How does that work: the fibrosis suffer from osmosis dissecation by transfer of water between the fibrosis and the concentrated dextrosis solution that by the end of the osmotic process leaves only a "shell" of what it was once fibrosis.

Beside the wrongfully term used to describe this process (inflamatory reaction - meaning in fact a reaction to an inflamation - put backwards due to lack of attention from the doctor responsible for the article) there is an urgent necessity to correct the mistake due to many also wrongfully interpretions from doctors, obviously, because of the extreme confusion that the term has caused.

Bottom of line, the result is the same, but if doctors are expecting to cause a reparatory inflamation process (atract blood cells to the damaged tissue aiming to achieve a tissue reconstruction or reparation), wich is what the backwards term sugests, they will frustrate themselves and their patients.

== Applications ==
In cataract surgery it is used to release the lens from its capsule by projecting a continuous flow of water from a cannula under the flap of the anterior capsule, which lifts the capsule membrane from the lens. By directing the flow the surgeon lifts the membrane around the sides and back of the capsule until the lens is completely loose as a prelude to phacoemulsification or direct extracapslar removal. Hydrodissection is also used in general surgery to release a trapped nerve or to reduce intraoperative blood losses.

== See also ==
- Cataract surgery
