= Steve Charles (surgeon) =

Steve Charles is a vitreoretinal surgeon who has developed many of the techniques and devices used by vitreoretinal surgeons worldwide. He authored a leading textbook in the field, "Vitreous microsurgery," which is now in its the 6th edition, and is printed in 6 languages worldwide. Charles also authored over 174 less organized articles, and over 50 book chapters.

== Societies, honors, and awards ==
Charles was awarded the Wacker Medal at the Club Jules Gonin (2002), the first Founders Medal of American Society of Vitreoretinal Surgeons (ASRS), The Award of Merit in Retina Research Presented in Conjunction with the Charles L. Schepens Lecture (2016), the Charles D. Kelman, MD Innovator's Lecture at American Society of Cataract and Refractive Surgery (ASCRS) (2018), and the American Academy of Ophthalmology Laureate (2018).

Charles was inducted into the University of Miami's School of Medicine Medical Alumni Association Hall of Fame and was named by Ocular Surgery News as one of the top ten innovators in the past 25 years. He is consistently listed in Best Doctors in America and Becker's Top 34 Ophthalmologists in America. He is a clinical professor of ophthalmology at the University of Tennessee.

== Personal life ==
Charles is an airline transport pilot with five jet type ratings, currently owning and flying a Dassault Falcon 50.

He is the father of three daughters.

== Works ==
Charles co-wrote the following highly cited book:

- Charles, Steve; Huddleston, Gabriel Stephen; Wood, Byron (2022). Vitreous microsurgery (6th ed.). Philadelphia: Lippincott Williams & Wilkins. ISBN 9781975168384.
