= Robert Machemer =

Robert Machemer (16 March 1933 in Münster – 23 December 2009 in Durham, North Carolina) was a German-American ophthalmologist, ophthalmic surgeon, and inventor. He is sometimes called the "father of modern retinal surgery."

Helmut Machemer, Robert's father, was an ophthalmologist who died in the Soviet Union on 18 May 1942, leaving a widow and three small sons. In 1953, when Robert Machemer completed his Abitur, he worked for six months in a steel mill to partially finance his medical school education. He studied medicine at the University of Münster, where he received his MD, and the University of Freiburg, where he received his Promotion in 1959. From 1962 to 1966 he was an assistant in the University Eye Clinic of Göttingen. In 1966 he received a two-year NATO fellowship and moved, with his wife and three-year-old daughter, to Miami to work at the Bascom Palmer Eye Institute. He remained at the Bascom Palmer Eye Institute until 1978, when he became the chair of Duke University Medical School's Department of Ophthalmology, serving in that capacity until 1991 and had his retirement as professor emeritus in 1998.

Machemer and Helmut Buettner created the vitreous infusion suction cutter (VISC), an instrument that made possible endoillumination and safe removal of the vitreous through extremely small cuts in the pars plana. On 20 April 1970 Machemer and his surgical team performed the first pars plana vitrectomy. (Who performed the first pars plana vitrectomy might be in dispute due to claims of priority by Japanese ophthalmologists.)

Although Machemer has historically been credited with developing pars plana vitrectomy, Anton Banko filed a patent for pars plana vitrectomy in September 1968, three years before Machemer first reported the technique.

He established an animal model of retinal detachment and used this model to study proliferative vitreoretinopathy (PVR), which Machemer originally called massive periretinal proliferation.

== Career highlights ==
- 1966 – Selected as a NATO Research Fellow at the Bascom Palmer Eye Institute
- 1970 – Performed the first pars plana vitrectomy in a human eye
- 1981 – Albrecht von Graefe Prize of the Deutsche Ophthalmologische Gesellschaft (German Ophthalmological Society)
- 1993 – Received the Ernst Jung Prize
- 1996 – Honored with the Howe Medal of the American Ophthalmological Society
- 1997 – Awarded the Helen Keller Prize for Vision Research by the Helen Keller Foundation
- 1998 – Received the prestigious Gonin Medal
- 2000 – Inducted into the ASCRS Ophthalmology Hall of Fame by the American Society of Cataract and Refractive Surgery
- 2003 – Honored with the Laureate Recognition Award from the American Academy of Ophthalmology
- 2010 – Establishment of the Robert Machemer Foundation
- 2016 – Retina Hall of Fame--posthumously

== Selected publications ==
- Machemer, R. (1975). Vitrectomy: a pars plana approach. NY: Grune & Stratton; xii+138 pages (appendix by William E. Benson)
  - Machemer, R.; Aaberg, T. M. (1979). 2nd edition; xv+262 pages
