= Charles Kelman =

American ophthalmologist and entertainer

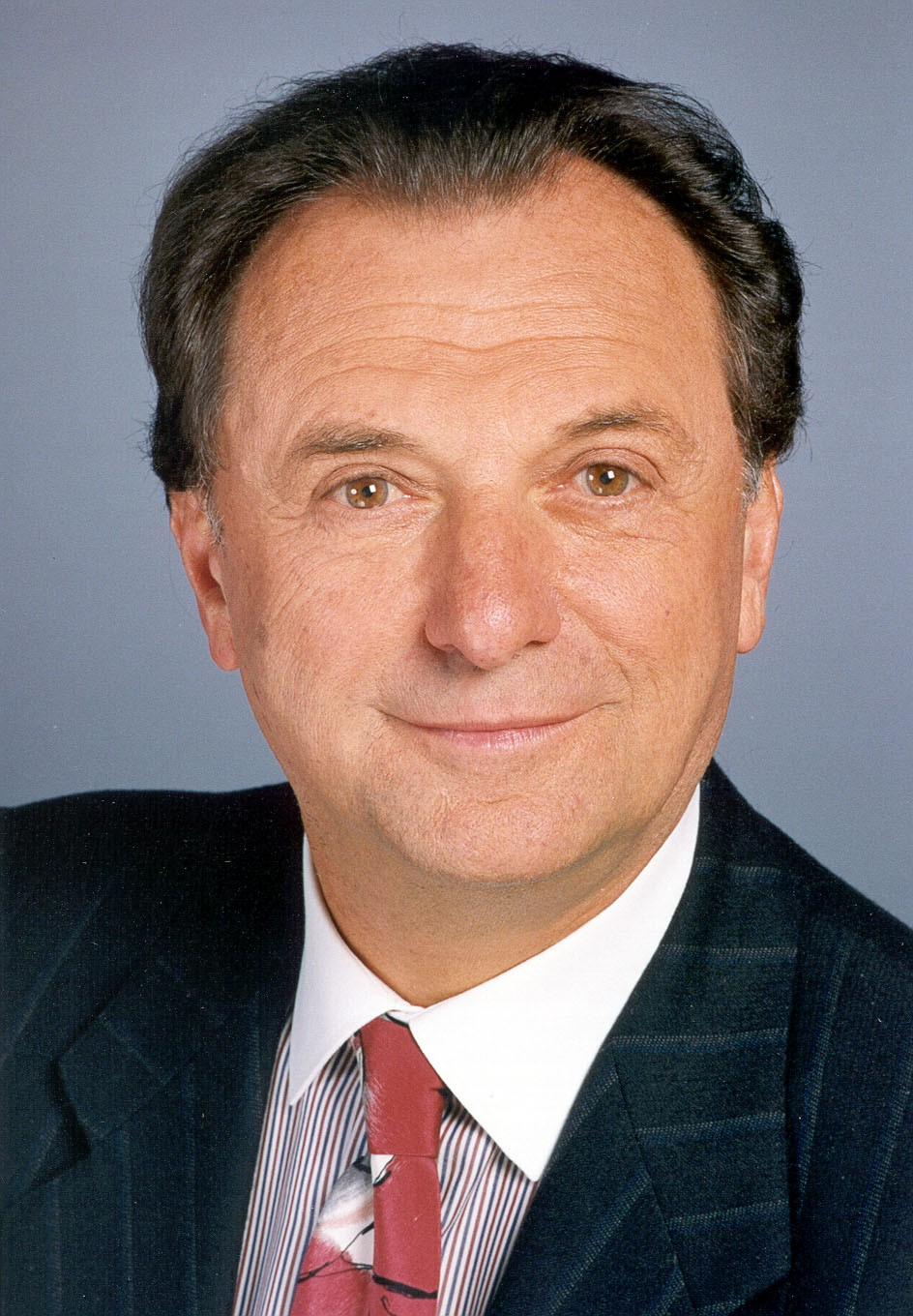
- Born: Charles David Kelman; May 23, 1930; Brooklyn, New York, U.S.
- Died: June 1, 2004 (aged 74); Boca Raton, Florida, U.S.
- Education: Tufts University, B.S., 1950; University of Geneva, M.D., 1956
- Occupations: Ophthalmologist, surgeon, inventor, jazz musician, entertainer and Broadway producer
- Known for: Inventing phacoemulsification as well as other surgical techniques and instruments
- Honors: Lasker Award; National Inventors Hall of Fame; National Medal of Technology

Charles David Kelman (May 23, 1930 – June 1, 2004) was an American ophthalmologist, surgeon, inventor, jazz musician, entertainer, and Broadway producer. Known as the father of phacoemulsification, he developed many of the medical devices, instruments, implant lenses and techniques used in cataract surgery. In the early 1960s, he began the use of cryosurgery to remove cataracts and repair retinal detachments. Cryosurgery for cataracts remained in heavy use until 1978, when phacoemulsification, a procedure Kelman also developed in 1967, became the modern standard treatment. Kelman was given the National Medal of Technology by President George H. W. Bush and recognized as the Ophthalmologist of the Century by the International Congress of Cataract and Refractive Surgery in Montreal, Canada. He was also inducted into the National Inventors Hall of Fame in Akron, Ohio, and received the 2004 Lasker Award.

Born in New York, Kelman graduated from Tufts University and earned his medical degree from University of Geneva before returning to New York to intern at Kings County Hospital and complete his residency at Wills Eye Hospital in Philadelphia. He was later an attending surgeon at the Manhattan Eye, Ear & Throat Hospital and the New York Eye and Ear Infirmary, and maintained a private practice. Kelman served as clinical professor of ophthalmology at New York Medical College and individually taught his techniques to many surgeons.

Kelman pursued a career as an entertainer alongside his medical career. He began playing the harmonica at a young age and performed on a radio show, The Horn and Hardart Children's Hour. He later learned to play the clarinet and saxophone. As a teenager, he formed a big band, began composing music, and played in his high school band and as first clarinet on the New York All-City Orchestra. While in medical school in Geneva, he appeared on two jazz radio shows and one on television. After returning to New York, he recorded a song, "Telephone Numbers", released by Chancellor Records to some success in national billboard charts. In 1975, he began appearing regularly on television, first on The Tonight Show Starring Johnny Carson, partially to promote phacoemulsification. He developed a musical comedy routine which he performed on television as well as in Atlantic City, Las Vegas, and Carnegie Hall in New York, alongside several notable jazz musicians and entertainers. He co-produced several Broadway musicals and wrote at least two off-Broadway musicals.

== Early life and education ==
Charles David Kelman was born on May 23, 1930, in Brooklyn, New York, to Eva and David Kelman. He grew up in East New York before the family moved to Forest Hills, Queens. His father was a Jewish immigrant from Greece who never received the proper compensation and recognition for his inventions, including the first tar-free cigarettes and cellophane Christmas wreaths. He inspired his son's desire to proudly seek recognition of his own inventions.

Charles began playing music at four years old, when he learned to play his first instrument, the harmonica. He began playing regularly for The Horn and Hardart Children's Hour radio show. Kelman also learned to play the saxophone and clarinet, receiving professional training from musicians in the big band era. While attending Forest Hills High School, he played in the high school band and as the first clarinet of the New York All-City Orchestra.

He dreamed of stardom in music, but said that when he was 17 years old, his father told him to bring his saxophone to the basement of their house and play for him. Charles played a song by Jimmy Dorsey after which his father asked if he had played as well as Dorsey. When Charles admitted he had not, his father announced: "You'll be a doctor."

Kelman attended Boston's Tufts University and graduated in just two years to earn a B.S. degree in 1950. He earned a Bachelor of Medical Science degree from the University of Geneva in 1952. He then studied medicine at the University of Geneva and, after learning that his father was diagnosed with cancer, accelerated his studies with the hope of having his father see him becoming a doctor. He obtained his M.D. degree in 1956, but not before his father's death the year before. After interning at Kings County Hospital from 1956 to 1957, he performed postgraduate work in ophthalmology at Bellevue Medical Center from 1957 to 1958, and then did his residency at Wills Eye Hospital in Philadelphia from 1958 to 1960.

== Career ==
=== As an ophthalmologist and surgeon ===
In 1960, Kelman started an ophthalmology private practice. In the fall of 1962, he began to experiment with the use of cryosurgery.

His first invention in 1962 was the ophthalmic cryoprobe which he used to freeze a cataractous lens before removal in intracapsular cataract extraction (ICCE), which removed the lens with the capsule intact. Kelman's cryoprobe using liquid nitrogen offered advantages over the carbon dioxide cryoprobe used for cataract extraction previously and published by Tadeusz Krwawicz in the British Journal of Ophthalmology on April 1, 1961. The technique has not often been used since 1978, as the advent of other techniques such as extracapsular cataract extraction (ECCE) (which Kelman helped develop) have taken its place. In January 1963, Kelman also published the use of cryopexy to experimentally freeze the retina in animal experiments. Cryopexy to treat retinal detachments had been demonstrated by Richard Deutschmann and Giambattista Bietti in the 1930s, but had not been popular because the older cryoprobes were not as effective.

In the fall of 1963, Kelman applied for a research grant from the John A. Hartford Foundation to further investigate freezing techniques in eye surgery and this grant was approved on December 3, 1963, and became active January 15, 1964. The grant proposed five uses of cryosurgery, the fourth of which was "a new technique for surgical removal of a cataractous lens that will require a hospital stay of twenty-four hours instead of two weeks and a return to normal activity within one week instead of thirty days." The original grant application and other records from the John A. Hartford Foundation were first reviewed in 2023. The idea for his next invention came to Kelman after seeing an ultrasonic device at his dentist's office. Kelman envisioned using a similar device that uses vibrations to break up a cataractous lens and remove it without a large incision. On July 13, 1965, Kelman first met with Cavitron Corp. engineer Anton Banko, to discuss adding ultrasonic energy to a rotary cutting tool with fluid irrigation / aspiration which Kelman's team had been testing.

Kelman named the procedure phacoemulsification, a technique that has become standard treatment for cataracts in wealthy countries. With medical instrument manufacturer Cavitron (which was later acquired by Coopervision), he devised an ultrasonic surgical instrument with a fluid aspiration and irrigation system. Contemporaneous records document that the first successful crystalline lens removals with phacoemulsification in any species took place in cats, and "were performed on March 23, and March 25 of this year 1966", although earlier attempts had been made. In 1967, Kelman secretly conducted his first surgery on a blind patient, awaiting enucleation, who volunteered knowing that the procedure would not bring back his vision. His first patient's eye became infected and was removed. However, he was successful on subsequent attempts. The progress report from April 5, 1966, indicated that the original device operated at 25,000 cycles per second, and Kelman reported in a letter on October 31, 1966: "It has very recently become apparent that twenty-five thousand cycles at a stroke of 7/1000 of an inch has some tardive (delayed) effects on the corneal endothelium and it will be necessary to construct other equipment which will function at a lower cycle." By March 1968, Kelman had created a smaller hand instrument. On July 25, 1967, Kelman and his co-inventor Anton Banko filed a patent application to register a phacoemulsification device for cataract surgery. Kelman began a novel business relationship with the manufacturer to produce the device.

After publishing "Phaco-emulsification and Aspiration—A New Technique for Cataract Removal: A Preliminary Report" in the American Journal of Ophthalmology, he began teaching courses to surgeons interested in learning this new technique. One of his students was Eric Arnott, a British ophthalmologist who introduced the procedure to the UK. Kelman's developments allowed the incision necessary for ECCE to be reduced from 11–12 mm (0.43–0.47 in) to 3 mm (0.12 in) and minimized recovery time. This new surgery method removed the need for an extended hospital stay and made the surgery less painful. The technique and similar tools have also been adopted and used in neurosurgery to remove tumors from the brain and spinal cord, and subsequently ushered a trend of minimally-invasive outpatient surgical procedures.

Phacoemulsification initially faced significant criticism and skepticism in the 1970s. The National Eye Institute labeled the procedure as experimental, allowing insurance companies to not cover the procedure. Kelman's critics said the procedure was "ridiculous" or "malpractice". At 1973 Welsh Cataract Symposium, surgeons presented results of negative outcomes from the procedure with actual patients paraded as evidence. In 1974, the American Academy of Ophthalmology (AAO) sponsored a comparative study of phacoemulsification, which found that the procedure was as effective as ICCE. Kelman decided to promote the procedure to the general public and, on February 21, 1975, appeared on The Tonight Show with Johnny Carson. The first International Congress on Phacoemulsification and Cataract Methodology sponsored by Foundation for Ophthalmic Education was held the same year and the procedure began to gain wider acceptance.

While many ophthalmologists accepted phacoemulsification and the small incision required as the best method for removing cataracts, they still needed to widen the incision to 6 mm (0.24 in) to insert a replacement artificial intraocular lens (IOL). While Kelman in 1975 began developing an IOL that could fit in smaller incisions, this issue was only overcome when Thomas R. Mazzocco invented the silicone IOL in the early 1980s. What became known as the "Mazzocco taco" could be folded and inserted in the same small incision used for phacoemulsification. When the foldable IOL was approved for use by the Food and Drug Administration in 1984, the clear advantage of Kelman's phacoemulsification was fully realized. That same year, the Kelman Satellite Teleconference was presented at the annual AAO conference, allowing the more than 400 in attendance to observe a live broadcast of Kelman performing five procedures.

Kelman treated many celebrities including Joe Frazier, Lionel Hampton, Rex Harrison, Ann Miller, Jan Peerce, and William B. Williams. Hedy Lamarr, who Kelman treated in October 1980, said "I was blind for more than seven years. But I'm fine now. Dr. Kelman gave me my sight back. He gave me my eyes." In 1992, The New York Times estimated that Kelman's innovation "shaved $7 billion a year from the nation's hospital bill." At various times in his career, Kelman served as clinical professor of ophthalmology at New York Medical College and as an attending surgeon at the Manhattan Eye, Ear & Throat Hospital and the New York Eye and Ear Infirmary. He published numerous articles, papers, and scientific book chapters, as well as a lay book, Cataracts: What You Must Know About Them, published by Crown Publishers in 1982. Later in his career, he invented a way to create collagen from a patient's skin to avoid allergic reactions. He continued to practice medicine, perform surgery, and teach alongside his career as an entertainer. Kelman held more than 100 patents for his instruments and innovations, and became known as the father of phacoemulsification. Cataract surgery with phacoemulsification is one of the most common surgeries in the world with more than 9.5 million such procedures performed each year around the world as of 2011.

=== As an entertainer ===
Kelman began composing music in high school and started a big band as a teenager. He continued his musical pursuits throughout his college education. While attending medical school in Geneva, he regularly performed on two jazz radio shows and another on television. He co-wrote "Le Petit Déjeuner (Paroles et Musique de François Charpin et Charles Kelman)" which was later recorded by the French singer Jean Sablon.

Using the stage name Kerry Adams, he recorded "Telephone Numbers", which was released by Chancellor Records to some success in national billboard charts in 1960. The song's success was cut short by the craze created by "The Twist" that would change the pop music genre. After this, Kelman believed his singing career had come to an end and began to focus on his medical career.

Just as his medical practice flourished, Kelman's celebrity grew after appearing on The Tonight Show Starring Johnny Carson in 1975, where he sang a song about a blind girl and promoted his surgical innovations. He continued to appear regularly on television shows hosted by Merv Griffin, Barbara Walters, Oprah Winfrey and David Letterman. As well as singing and playing the saxophone, he developed a musical comedy routine which he also performed in Atlantic City and Las Vegas, opening for or performing alongside the Spinners, Glen Campbell, James Darren, Dizzy Gillespie, Lionel Hampton and Regis Philbin. He also rented out Carnegie Hall for several benefit concerts in the mid-1970s.

Kelman co-produced several musicals on Broadway, including Can-Can (1981), Triumph of Love (1997), and The Sound of Music (1998–1999), and was a member of the Friars Club in New York. He recorded an album, Moonlight Serenade, released in 1992 by Columbia Records. The Marrano, a musical he wrote based on a premise that the Italian explorer Christopher Columbus was Jewish, also previewed in Cape Cod in 1992. His latest musical, The Right Pair of Shoes, was due to premiere in 2004 at the Caldwell Theatre in Boca Raton, Florida.

== Awards and honors ==
Kelman receiving the National Medal of Technology from President George H. W. Bush with Barbara Franklin, Secretary of Commerce

In 1970, Kelman was awarded by the American Academy of Achievement. In 1982, he was a recipient of the Congressional Salute in the U.S. Senate, 97th Congress, in Washington, D.C. In 1985, Kelman presented the first American Society of Cataract and Refractive Surgery (ASCRS) Innovator's Lecture. The lecture series was named in his honor in 2003. He also delivered the ASCRS's Binkhorst Lecture in 1989, the Ridley Medal from the International Congress of Ophthalmology in 1990, and the Arthur J. Bedell Memorial Lecture at Wills Eye Hospital in 1991.

In June 1992, Kelman was awarded the National Medal of Technology from President George H. W. Bush. The same year, he had received the Distinguished Service Award from Tufts University and the Inventor of the Year Award from the New York Patent, Trademark and Copyright Law Association. At the July 1994 International Congress of Cataract and Refractive Surgery in Montreal, Canada, he was recognized as the Ophthalmologist of the Century.

In 1999, Kelman was selected as one of the ten most influential ophthalmologists of the 20th century by the ASCRS and became president of the society. The following year, he received a Doctor of Letters from Thomas Jefferson University's Wills Eye Hospital Retina Service and the hospital also named its research facility the Charles D. Kelman Laboratory and Library. In 2003, Kelman received the Laureate Recognition Award from the AAO and the annual AAO Charles D. Kelman Lecture was established in 2005. In February 2004, he was inducted into the National Inventors Hall of Fame in Akron, Ohio. He was also awarded the 2004 Lasker Award, with the jury making an exception to the rules to allow the award to be given posthumously.

In January 2010, the New York public television station WLIW aired a documentary titled Through My Eyes: The Charlie Kelman Story; his autobiography published in 1985 was also titled Through My Eyes.

== Personal life and death ==
Kelman and his first wife Joan Kelman (later Bernstein) had three children: David Joseph (who died in 2003), Lesley, and Jennifer. With his second wife Ann, he had three sons: Evan, Jason, and Seth. Kelman was an avid golfer and learned to fly a helicopter later in life. In 1996, he moved to Boca Raton, where he died of lung cancer on June 1, 2004, at the age of 74.
