= Cultural loss =

Erosion of cultural practices or beliefs

Lost technology
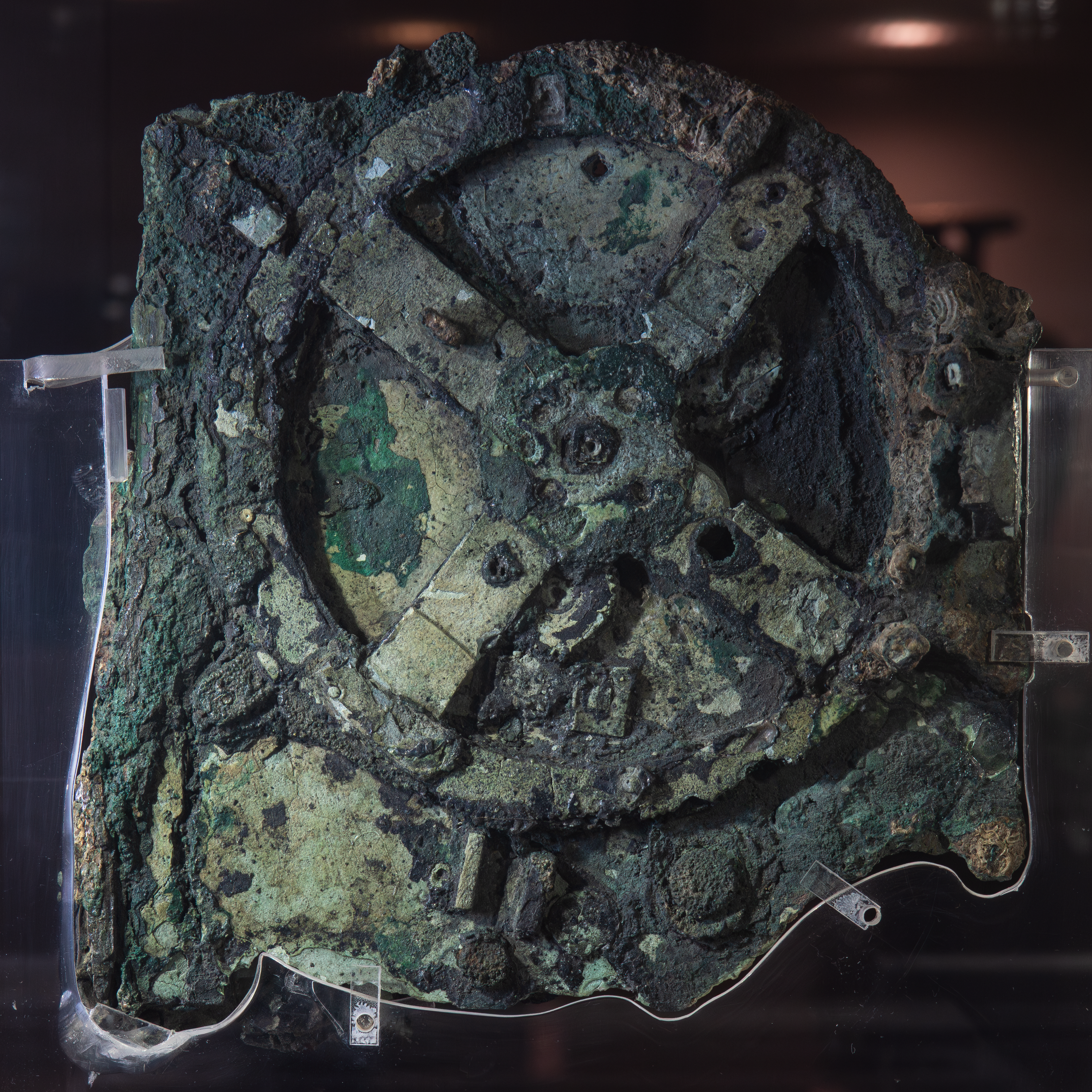
- Skilled labour on how to create complex computational mechanisms was lost for thousands of years in that part of the world (Fragment A of the Antikythera mechanism – front 13 cm (5 in) in diameter).
- Type: Analogue computer
- Writing: Ancient Greek
- Created: 2nd century BC
- Period/culture: Hellenistic
- Discovered: 1901; Antikythera, Greece
- Present location: National Archaeological Museum, Athens

Cultural loss refers to the erosion, disappearance, or transformation of the practices, languages, identities, knowledge systems, beliefs, arts, and social structures that define a community or society. Cultural loss happens in both human and non-human animal societies. It may affect individual practices, entire communities, or broader cultural diversity within a population. Cultural loss through past and present periods is argued as highly detrimental when the loss of adaptive knowledge cascades into reduction of well-being. Research has also associated perceived cultural or identity loss with changes in social attitudes and economic prospects.

In human contexts, cultural loss is experienced at several levels. At the level of practices, cultural loss may involve the discontinuation of specific skills, technologies, or traditions. At the community level, cultural loss might involve a shift of the self-identification of the people in a group, the death or assimilation of the people, and the disappearance of many of the cultural practices associated with the identity, such as language, religion, rituals, symbols, oral traditions, foods, sustenance practices, sports and games. At the population level, cultural loss can be the loss of cultural diversity over an area, due to the disappearance of identity groups, languages or practices.

Cultural loss at each of these levels may occur gradually or abruptly through processes such as prohibition, globalisation, technological change, economic integration, war, forced displacement, environmental degradation, natural disasters, pandemics, migration, or colonial domination. In some cases, such processes have been described as Ethnocide.

Cultural loss is frequently discussed in relation to post-colonial reconciliation processes and the recognition of historical policies that suppressed indigenous cultures. These processes recognise and offer transparency to the actions and effects that such policies had on cultural loss, language loss, displacement, land eviction, boarding schools, reservations, natality control, socio-economical degradation, segregation and prohibition of cultural practices. Initiatives such as the Truth and Reconciliation Commission of Canada have examined the impacts of residential schools, land dispossession, and the prohibition of cultural practices on indigenous communities. In 2023, to compensate for the loss of language and culture caused by its residential school system, the Canadian government agreed to a C$2.8 billion settlement in a class-action lawsuit to compensate Canadian First Nations.

== History and diversity of terminology ==
Awareness of the disappearance of cultural practices can be traced back to antiquity, when historians and philosophers recorded the decline of languages, customs, and technologies in conquered or changing societies. However, systematic academic study of such processes developed much later.

One of the earliest scholarly treatments is found in the 1912 work The Disappearance of Useful Arts by the British anthropologist W. H. R. Rivers. Drawing on ethnographic observations in Oceania prior to sustained Western contact, Rivers documented the loss of several technologies and practices, including canoe construction, pottery production, and the bow and arrow in warfare.

Rivers proposed several mechanisms to explain the disappearance of such practices:

- The death of specialised craftspeople without successors.
- Restricted or secret knowledge that may be lost if it is not transmitted.
- Gradual decline in use or prestige.
- Lack of access to necessary materials or environmental resources.

Although W. H. R. Rivers did not use the term "cultural loss," his analysis examined similar processes from a practice-centred perspective. His terminology, such as "disappearance of useful arts," reflects the same conceptual frame as related phenomena, including deculturalisation, "cultural loss," "culture loss," "loss of culture", and "cultural extinction.". This diversity of terms reflects the absence of a standardised field or vocabulary for describing such processes, differences in disciplinary perspectives, theoretical frameworks, and historical contexts.

Cultural loss is also interpreted as both the process of loss and the final product of having lost an element of a culture or a whole cultural identity. This dichotomy makes it difficult to group all the conversations that talk about the disappearance of cultural elements in the same category.

For the state of culture being lost, is mostly what W. H. R. Rivers refers to above. This loss outcome is more difficult to pin down, as cultural elements, or even identities, can be recovered if enough effort and capacity is invested in bringing them back. Also, convergent evolution might independently invent and adopt elements that look the same as previously lost ones, but without any cultural continuity. In these scenarios loss is only temporal from the perspective of an observer looking at deep time, notwithstanding reinnovation and readoption dynamics being clearly distinct from gradual change.

In the below definition the dynamical aspect of the process of loss is emphasised.

== Definition and scope ==
While human and non-human animal cultures have always changed over time, the term "cultural loss" is often used to describe non-linear change, in which elements of a culture disappear faster than they can be transmitted or adapted.

=== Loss in non-human animal cultures ===
Animal culture is widely studied and found across many domains of life, most commonly as socially learned behaviour transmitted among individuals of the same or different species that co-inhabit a space. These practices and learned behaviours are susceptible to loss, in some cases reducing the adaptability of individuals to their environments.

Loss of culture in non-human animals has received increased attention since the late 2010s, particularly in conservation research. Some studies argue that conservation should focus on preserving not only species and genetic diversity but also the socioecological knowledge, behaviour, and experience maintained within populations. Case studies often cited in this context include elephants, whales, dolphins, migratory birds, and songbirds.

=== Loss in human culture, cultures, and cultural practices ===
For humans, beyond social learning of behaviour, cultural loss involves a wide range of phenomena across at least three domains:

- Cultural practices: a sudden change in which part of the cultural repertoire is no longer expressed. This may involve the loss of specific practices and their dependent elements, such as expertise, materials, tools, vocabulary, or forms of representation.
- Loss of culture: a region-wide reduction in knowledge and expertise, in which the diversity of practice, language, identity, subsistence strategies, technologies, landscape management systems, rituals, arts, symbols, and other cultural expressions declines.
- Loss of cultures: the disappearance of a community identity. This may occur through extinction of a group, death of most of its members, assimilation into other communities, prohibition of identity practices, displacement, or Ethnocide.

In human contexts, cultural loss at these levels is often assessed through indicators such as:

- Disappearance of traditional ecological knowledge.
- Destruction or neglect of heritage sites.
- Decline of rituals, crafts, and customary practices.
- Loss of collective memory through displacement or assimilation.
- Loss of languages and reduction of linguistic diversity.
- Decline of non-dominant religious traditions in particular regions.

Policymakers often distinguish cultural loss from ordinary cultural change by its association with rapid disruption, structural inequality, or the breakdown of intergenerational transmission.

== Dynamics of loss ==
The dynamics and mechanisms that modulate cultural loss are diverse. They operate at different temporal and geographical scales, as well as across different domains of practice, identity, and cultural diversity. What is considered lost may also be interpreted differently depending on the perspective or temporal scale of analysis, as some practices are later revitalised, recovered, or reinvented. Examples include the reintroduction of the crawl swimming stroke in Europe, concrete, the revival of the ancient Olympic Games, the reintroduction of earlier forms of cataract surgery, and the rediscovery of traditional techniques in the glassmaking industry.

Therefore, the dynamics that are of interest are those that lead to the discontinuation of a practice, such that no population remains with the expertise to perform it successfully on a first attempt. This loss of expertise may occur within a single generation, as skills can be lost within relatively short periods of time. One example is the need to retrain cardiopulmonary resuscitation after two to three years without practice.

=== Colonialism and imperial expansion ===
One of the most widely studied causes of cultural loss in human societies is colonial expansion, particularly from the fifteenth century onwards. European empires frequently imposed their religions, languages, legal systems, governance structures, administrative practices, and economic institutions on colonised populations.

Colonial administrations, missionary activity, and corporate interests have at times prohibited, discouraged, or persecuted cultural practices that were seen as conflicting with ideological, religious, administrative, or economic objectives. In other cases, persecution has targeted specific socioethnographic groups in order to erase their identity, in processes often described as Ethnocide or cultural genocide.

Such suppression may be enforced both in the present and in how the past is remembered. In settler colonies such as Australia, Greenland, Canada, the United States, South Africa, parts of Latin America, and the Philippines, assimilationist policies were often implemented through the prohibition of specific cultural practices (see Genocide of indigenous peoples). One example is the ban on potlatching, introduced by the Canadian government in 1885 and lifted in 1951.

In many regions, these processes have involved:

- Religious conversion.
- Suppression of indigenous languages.
- Reorganisation of land, resources, wealth, and labour systems.
- Destruction or appropriation of sacred sites, species, and artefacts.

Such enforcement has often involved a combination of violence, intimidation, warfare, displacement, incarceration, proselytism, biological warfare, and environmental degradation.

=== Loss and destruction of institutions ===
Much knowledge and expertise in human societies is created, stored, and transmitted through a wide range of institutional administrative, and corporate structures. When such social organisations disappear, the information associated with them may become highly susceptible to erosion or loss.

Institutions range from formal to informal structures. Formal institutions often have specialised workforces trained over long periods to develop particular expertise and accumulate knowledge in order to perform specific social functions.

Institutions, like other cultural expressions, may be discontinued, with experts and workforces ceasing to use their skills or becoming dispersed, leading to the loss of institutional knowledge. Institutions can disappear through a variety of pathways, including financial collapse, prohibition, destruction of infrastructure and archives, persecution of personnel, absorption, abandonment, or revolution.

Archaeological evidence suggests that many episodes interpreted as societal collapse correspond to the destruction or abandonment of buildings associated with administrative, aristocratic, or religious centres. Examples include the destruction of large buildings in parts of the ancestral Puebloan region after prolonged droughts, and the destruction of Mycenaean palace complexes following the Santorini eruption. Similarly, conquering or colonial powers have often dismantled or absorbed local institutions in order to establish control. Examples include the destruction of Philippine polities and maritime traditions, including the construction of karakoas, and the prohibition of the potlatch in the United States and Canada.

The outcome of such actions has often been the loss of specialised expertise and knowledge stored in institutions, particularly where they relied on archives and trained specialists. Examples include the decline of the Andean Quipu system, the loss of Mesoamerican writing systems, the disappearance of literacy in Cuneiform and Egyptian hieroglyphs and the discontinuation of Linear B. Moreover, the weakening of institutions might make more likely the accidental and intentional destruction of archives erases large amounts of stored knowledge difficult or impossible to recover.

Social institutions also often maintain practices, rituals, and symbols central to identity formation and continuity. When such institutions disappear, associated traditions may fall out of use and vanish from collective memory, sometimes affecting the socioeconomic conditions of surrounding communities. Examples include the decline and relocation of local football clubs in parts of the United Kingdom and the impact on the identity of neighbourhoods and the Dissolution of the monasteries in sixteenth-century England.

=== Globalisation and economic integration ===
Modern globalisation has increased cultural exchange but has also been associated with cultural homogenisation, which may facilitate the loss of practices, identities, and cultural diversity. The spread of global media, multinational corporations, and dominant languages has reshaped cultural landscapes worldwide, affecting economic structures, subsistence strategies, identity practices, marriage patterns, gastronomy, education, land management, conflict resolution, and language proficiency. Some scholars argue that global consumer culture promotes standardised lifestyles and values, reducing the diversity of local traditions.

Globalisation, however, does not necessarily produce cultural loss in all contexts. Some aspects of globalisation may also facilitate cultural revival, hybridisation, and the redefinition of identities.

=== Urbanisation and migration ===
Urbanisation and migration may weaken traditional cultural practices, particularly when communities are displaced from ancestral lands or incorporated into dominant societies, often through processes of Enculturation and Acculturation.

Diaspora communities may preserve identity through the reinterpretation of cultural traditions in new contexts, especially through gastronomy, rituals, festivals, and artistic expression, despite the loss of land-based knowledge systems, changes in social structures, and reduced use of minority languages.

=== Technological and environmental change ===
Technological development, industrialisation, and environmental degradation have also contributed to cultural loss.

Examples include:

- Mechanised production displacing traditional crafts.
- Infrastructure projects destroying archaeological or sacred sites.
- Climate change threatening communities whose cultures are tied to specific ecosystems.

The disappearance of particular species or landscapes may also lead to the loss of associated stories, rituals, and ecological knowledge.

=== Tourism ===
The impact of tourism on receiving societies has also been studied as a mechanism contributing to cultural loss.

Tourism can be a part of cultural loss if there is a continuous demand from tourists that impacts the local culture, traditions and cultural expressions in any manner. Some experts argue that a growth in tourism can support cultural celebration and cultural exchange in addition to the economic benefits of conservation; however, some researchers and experts have pointed out that tourism, when it develops too quickly or without proper management, can foster the commercialisation of a cultural phenomenon, diminishing its traditional social, religious or historical foundations. Changes to cultural performances, ceremonies and crafts are not uncommon where visitors have expectations that are conflicting with the culture, which can result in their cultural tradition becoming standardised or simplified through conventions that are agreed upon by the community.

The development of tourism could also impact on the use of language, architecture, clothing, food and ways of communicating with one another. With greater contact with foreign cultures and the economic advantages offered by tourism, it is possible that communities may begin to take on practices that do not necessarily benefit them as members of the community, but rather aim to make them more appealing to visitors, or become more lucrative for the community. This can, in the long term, lead to a gradual overshadowing of the indigenous languages and traditional professions.

The degree of cultural erosion has been agreed to depend on community involvement and values in its preservation and indications of the tourism management. These are seen as being an aim that can be achieved by the development of sustainable tourism, one that is through more participatory management and the protection of culturally significant sites, and also ensuring that the economic advantages of tourism are not felt at the cost of the cultural integrity of the host. As a result, tourism is considered to be both positively and negatively impactful on cultural heritage, depending on the economic development, conservation efforts and the sustainability of inter-generational transfer of cultural heritage.

== Vocabulary loss vs language loss ==
Language loss is one of the most visible forms of cultural loss. However, beyond the loss of a particular language, what may also be lost is specialised vocabulary associated with practices, expertise, and knowledge no longer in use by the society, even when the language itself may be preserved in other domains. For example, the preservation of the Languages of the Philippines despite the colonial suppression of other cultural practices, religion and local administrations.

When a language is lost, it may also erase oral histories, literature, and unique worldviews and conceptual frameworks if these cannot be properly translated or preserved in the language of enculturation.

== Cultural loss vs cultural change ==
The distinction between cultural change and cultural loss is not clearly defined. Cultural change is a normal and expected process of cultural evolution, as cultures are dynamic systems. Cultural change is a broader category that includes loss, but also continuous change from previous states, or additive innovation that does not necessarily remove previous cultural elements. Cultural loss, as per the above definition, occurs when "elements of a culture disappear faster than they can be transmitted or adapted". That non-linear, step-change makes the cultural loss dynamics a distinct process within cultural change.

Moreover, cultural loss outside cultural evolution is often associated with deterioration in well-being or the social capacity and diversity of a region.

Some cultural practices, identities, and forms of cultural diversity may disappear without a meaningful or appreciable impact on the well-being of the populations involved. This process is often understood as cultural change. Cultural practices and identities are not static entities that must be preserved unchanged. Attempts to "freeze" traditions may create artificial or romanticised versions of the past.

Communities experiencing rapid cultural loss may face social breakdown, increased violence and substance abuse, declining socioeconomic indicators, environmental degradation, displacement, lack of access to resources and meaningful places, health problems, disconnection from ancestral knowledge, deterioration in diet, and intergenerational trauma, among other effects.

Moreover, cultural loss or change may affect different members of a society in different ways, with some improving their socioeconomic conditions, others experiencing little change, and others deteriorating severely. Cultural loss, in both human and non-human societies, and its connection to well-being, is therefore often studied on a case-by-case basis.

== Cultural preservation ==
=== Intangible heritage ===
Member states of Convention on Intangible Cultural Heritage

In the early twenty-first century, international organisations began to emphasise the protection of intangible cultural practices. The 2003 Convention for the Safeguarding of the Intangible Cultural Heritage established an international framework for recognising and protecting oral traditions, performing arts, social practices, rituals, and traditional craftsmanship. The convention created lists of intangible cultural heritage elements and encouraged member states to implement policies aimed at preserving living traditions.

By 2025, less than 900 practices worldwide had been inscribed on UNESCO's intangible cultural heritage lists. Participation in the convention varies by country, and some states with large indigenous populations, including Canada and the United States, are not parties to the convention. Moreover, despite being active since 2008, the UNESCO Intangible Cultural Heritage Lists (as 2025) has only recognised 100 practices in need of urgent protection.

=== Indigenous safeguarding ===
Alongside intergovernmental initiatives, a number of non-governmental organisations have sought to address cultural loss, particularly among indigenous peoples. Organisations such as Survival International campaign for the protection of indigenous land rights, languages, and cultural practices. Such organisations often argue that cultural survival is closely linked to environmental protection and political autonomy.

These groups frequently work in partnership with local communities to document endangered traditions, support language revitalisation, and advocate for legal protections for indigenous lands and cultural practices.

== See also ==
- Cultural bereavement
- Cultural assimilation
- Cultural heritage
- Language death
- Globalization
- Postcolonialism
- Enculturation
- Deculturalization
- Acculturation
