= Deculturalization =

Destruction of the culture of a society

Deculturalization is the process by which an ethnic group is forced to abandon its language, culture, and customs. It is the destruction of the culture of a dominated group and its replacement with the culture of the dominating group. Deculturalization is a slow process due to its extensive goal of fully replacing the subordinate ethnic group's culture, language, and customs. This term is often confused with assimilation and acculturation.

== Methods of deculturalization ==
- Geographical segregation
- Forbidding education to the dominated group
- Forceful replacing of language
- Superior culture's curriculum in schools
- Instructors are from the dominant group
- Avoiding the dominated group's culture in curriculum

== Deculturalization in the United States ==
=== African Americans ===
The enslavement of African Americans during the 18th and 19th centuries in the United States is a form of deculturalization. Slavery in the United States made the African Americans dependent on their owners allowing for the owners to exploit them. The owners removed their African names, did not allow them to read, and did not allow them to practice their culture and language. Deculturalization of African Americans stems back to when the African American slaves were forbidden access to education due to fear of a slave revolt against the slaveholders. A series of court cases helped along the deculturalization of African Americans, but there were also cases which went against this trend. Among the latter one can count the addition of the 14th Amendment to the United States Constitution, the Dred Scott v. Sandford decision, Brown v. Board of Education, Plessy v. Ferguson, and countless others. After the Civil War, segregated education continued and there was a struggle to integrate fully and completely. While integration was indeed achieved, the textbooks that the African American students learn from are biased and contain material from the dominant, Anglo-American culture.

=== Latin Americans ===
The deculturalization of Latinos can refer back to the Mexican–American War of 1846–1848 and the Treaty of Guadalupe Hidalgo. Once the United States won California, Texas, New Mexico, Arizona, Nevada, Utah, and parts of Wyoming and Colorado, Mexicans who were living in these areas were removed from their lands. Their identity in the United States changed constantly from Mexican to White and vice versa until the word Hispanic was created to refer to these Mexican Americans. By simply using the word Hispanic to refer to the Mexican Americans and later the Latin-American immigrants one refers to the culture of the initial European conqueror-the Spanish culture. Latinos in the United States also had segregated schooling. While they were allowed to have bilingual education, the primary, enforced language is the English one. In some schools Latinos were corporally punished for speaking Spanish in the classroom. In some universities, Latinos were also forced to take many speech classes in order to remove the accents of the Latinos when they spoke English. While that is not seen evidently in schools anymore, the education system continues to enforce English, Anglo-American customs, culture and language as the dominant one.

=== Asian Americans ===
Asian Americans began to be deculturalized by not being allowed to be naturalized, based on the Chinese Exclusion Act, Japanese internment, forbidding land ownership, and enforcing Anglo culture upon them. The Naturalization Act of 1790 did not allow for the Chinese along with other Asians to become naturalized, because the naturalization process was limited only to the Anglo community in the United States. In terms of schooling, in some cases Asian Americans were denied an education entirely. It was not until the 1900s that Asian Americans were allowed to receive an education through the implementation of certain provisions. In 1855, the Chan Yong case fortified that the Chinese are not "white" therefore ineligible for citizenship due to the Naturalization Act of 1790. Also, in 1922, the court case Ozawa v. United States, the Japanese man understood he was not allowed to be naturalized due to the former act, but asked for the Japanese to be considered white, but was denied the request. The Ozawa v. United States shows how some Asians would rather refer to themselves as white than as Japanese or their individual ethnic group, because of the advantages of being "white". The enforced Anglo-American culture upon the Asians and using them during the Cold War as a model minority that the United States is not racist, it is the individual's fault allows for deculturalization to be successful. Jade Snow Wong is a Chinese-American writer who was used by the American government to travel to the Asian world and show how an Asian can succeed in America.

=== Indigenous Americans ===
Once the first settlement in Jamestown 1607 occurred, the Pre-American deculturalization process began. When the English came to America they looked to the Native Americans as "pagans" and "savages". Native Americans believed that the land was not property, a thing to be claimed and owned. Once the English settlers arrived this was one of the major culture difference that needed to be extinguished. The idea of private property and ownership was enforced upon the Native Americans. Some accepted this new concept because they understood the consequences, but their lands were nevertheless also taken away. The Europeans wanted to impose the traditional "Christian" nuclear family among the Native Americans. To achieve their goals, the colonists created the Native American Educational Programs. Christian missionaries such as John Eliot learned the Native American language in order to convert them to Christianity. Conversion led to the segregation among the "pagans" and the converted. The Native Americans were exploited. There was a cultural genocide and simply genocide against the Native Americans - from the Trail of Tears to the appropriation of their designs in order to gain capital and corporate gains.

== See also ==
- Cultural bereavement
- Cultural genocide
- Forced assimilation
- Institutional racism
- Americanization (immigration)
- Acculturation
- Linguistic discrimination
- Language death
