= History of cataract surgery =

Development of the procedure for removing an opacified lens from the eye

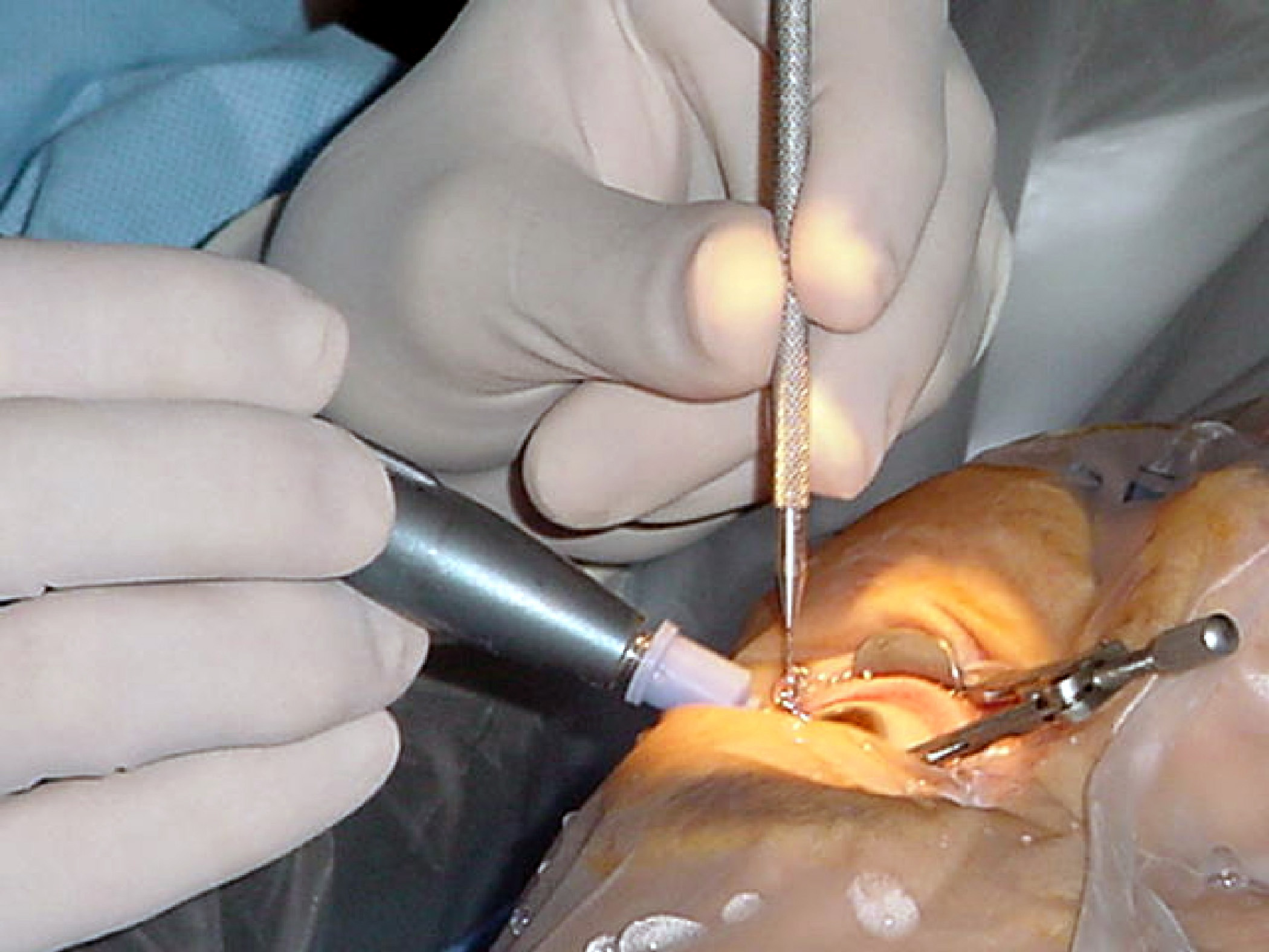
Cataract surgery, using a temporal approach phacoemulsification probe (in right hand) and "chopper" (in left hand)

Cataract surgery has a long history in Europe, Asia, and Africa. It is one of the most common and successful surgical procedures in worldwide use, thanks to improvements in techniques for cataract removal and developments in intraocular lens (IOL) replacement technology, in implantation techniques, and in IOL design, construction, and selection. Surgical techniques that have contributed to this success include microsurgery, viscoelastics, and phacoemulsification.

Cataract surgery is the removal of the natural lens of the eye that has developed a cataract, an opaque or cloudy area. Over time, metabolic changes of the crystalline lens fibres lead to the development of a cataract, causing impairment or loss of vision. Some infants are born with congenital cataracts, and environmental factors may lead to cataract formation. Early symptoms may include strong glare from lights and small light sources at night and reduced visual acuity at low light levels.

Couching (lens depression) was the original form of cataract surgery and was used from antiquity. Chrysippus of Soli, a stoic Greek philosopher, provided the earliest account of it. Couching is still occasionally found in traditional medicine in parts of Africa and Asia. In 1753, Samuel Sharp performed the first-recorded surgical removal of the entire lens and lens capsule, equivalent to what became known as intracapsular cataract extraction. The lens was removed from the eye through a limbal incision. At the beginning of the 20th century, the standard surgical procedure was intracapsular cataract extraction (ICCE). In 1949, Harold Ridley introduced the concept of implantation of the intraocular lens (IOL), which made visual rehabilitation after cataract surgery a more efficient, effective, and comfortable process.

In 1967, Charles Kelman introduced phacoemulsification, which uses ultrasonic energy to emulsify the nucleus of the crystalline lens and remove cataracts by aspiration without a large incision. This method of surgery reduced the need for an extended hospital stay and made out-patient surgery the standard. In 1985, Thomas Mazzocco developed and implanted the first foldable IOL. Graham Barrett and associates pioneered the use of silicone, acrylic, and hydrogel foldable lenses, making it possible to reduce the incision width. In 1987, Blumenthal and Moisseiev described the use of a reduced incision size for ECCE. In 1989, M. McFarland introduced a self-sealing incision architecture, and in 2009, Praputsorn Kosakarn described a method for manual fragmentation of the lens, which consists in splitting the lens into three pieces for extraction, allowing a smaller, sutureless incision, and requires implantation of a foldable IOL. This technique uses less expensive instruments and is suitable for use in developing countries.

== Couching ==
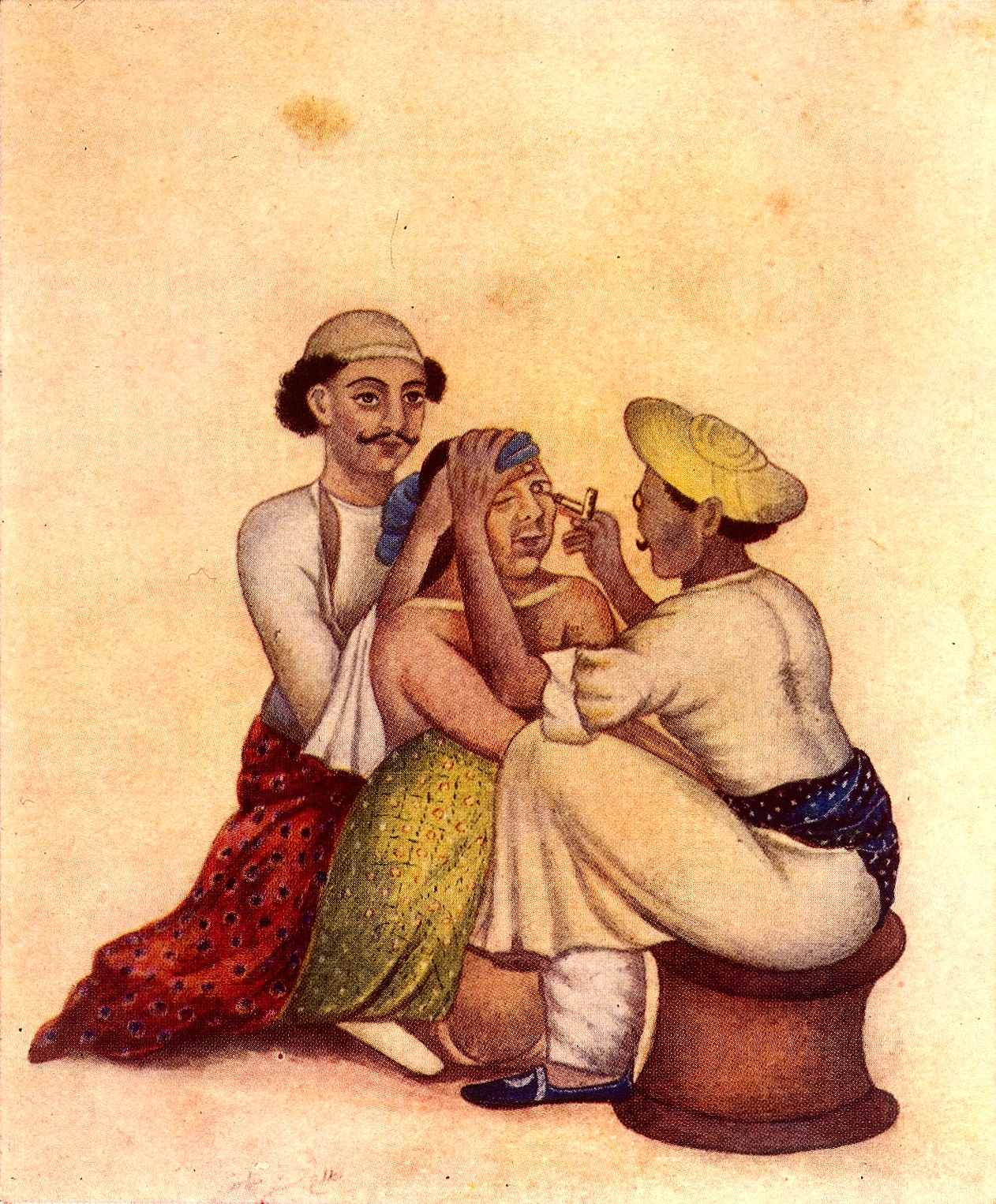
"Couching for cataract"; Wellcome Collection illustration of Indian doctors performing couching.

Couching is the earliest-documented form of cataract surgery, and one of the oldest surgical procedures ever performed. In this technique, the lens is dislodged and pushed aside into the vitreous cavity, but not removed from the eye, thus removing the opacity from the visual axis, but also the ability to focus. After being used regularly for centuries, couching has been mostly abandoned in favour of more effective techniques, due to its generally poor outcomes, and is currently only routinely practised in remote areas of developing countries.

Cataract surgery was first mentioned in the Babylonian code of Hammurabi 1750 BCE. The earliest known depiction of cataract surgery is on a statue from the Fifth Dynasty of Egypt (2467–2457 BCE). According to Francisco J Ascaso et al, a "relief painting from tomb number TT 217 in a worker settlement in Deir el-Medina" shows "the man buried in the tomb, Ipuy ... one of the builders of royal tombs in the renowned Valley of the Kings, circa 1279–1213 BC" as he underwent cataract surgery. Although direct evidence for cataract surgery in ancient Egypt is lacking, the indirect evidence, including surgical instruments that could have been used for the procedure, show that it was possible. It is assumed that the couching technique was used.

Couching was practiced in ancient India and subsequently introduced to other countries by Indian physician Sushruta (c. 6th century BCE), who described it in his medical text, Sushruta Samhita ("Compendium of Sushruta"); the work's Uttaratantra section (Note: chapter 17, verses 55–69) describes an operation in which a curved needle was used to push the opaque "phlegmatic matter" (Note: kapha in Sanskrit) in the eye out of the way of vision. The phlegm was then said to be blown out of the nose. The eye would later be soaked with warm, clarified butter before being bandaged. The removal of cataracts by surgery was introduced into China from India, and flourished in the Sui (581–618 CE) and Tang (618–907 CE) dynasties. According to a paper published in the peer-reviewed journal Annals of Translational Medicine, much of the material in ophthalmology literature attributing cataract surgery to Sushruta is copied from earlier papers without verification from the original sources. According to ophthalmic historian Julius Hirschberg, whether the cataract operation was actually invented by the Indians can so far neither be confirmed nor denied.

The first references to cataract and its treatment in Europe are found in 29 CE in De Medicina, a medical treatise by Latin encyclopedist Aulus Cornelius Celsus, which describes a couching operation. In 2nd century CE, Galen of Pergamon, a prominent Greek physician, surgeon, and philosopher, reportedly performed an operation to remove a cataract-affected lens using a needle-shaped instrument. Although many 20th-century historians have claimed that Galen believed the lens to be in the exact centre of the eye, there is evidence that he understood the crystalline lens is located in the anterior aspect of the eye.

The removal of cataracts by couching was a common surgical procedure in Djenné and many other parts of Africa. Couching continued to be used throughout the Middle Ages, and is still used to this day in some parts of Africa and in Yemen. However, it has been proven to be an ineffective and dangerous method of cataract therapy, which often leads to blindness or only partially restored vision. The technique has mostly been replaced by extracapsular cataract surgery, including phacoemulsification.

The lens can also be removed by suction through a hollow instrument: bronze oral-suction instruments that seem to have been used for this method of cataract extraction during the 2nd century CE have been unearthed. Such a procedure was described by the 10th-century Persian physician Muhammad ibn Zakariya al-Razi, who attributed it to Antyllus, a 2nd-century Greek physician. According to al-Razi, the procedure "required a large incision in the eye, a hollow needle, and an assistant with an extraordinary lung capacity". This suction procedure was also described by Iraqi ophthalmologist Ammar Al-Mawsili in his 10th-century medical text, Choice of Eye Diseases. He presented case histories of its usage, while claiming to have successfully performed it on a number of patients. Extracting the lens has the benefit of removing the possibility of the lens migrating back into the field of vision. According to oculist Al-Shādhili, a later variant of the cataract needle in 14th-century Egypt used a screw to grip the lens. It is not clear how often, if ever, this method was used; other writers, including Abu al-Qasim al-Zahrawi and Al-Shadhili, appear to have been unfamiliar with this procedure, or claimed it was ineffective.

== Eighteenth and nineteenth centuries ==
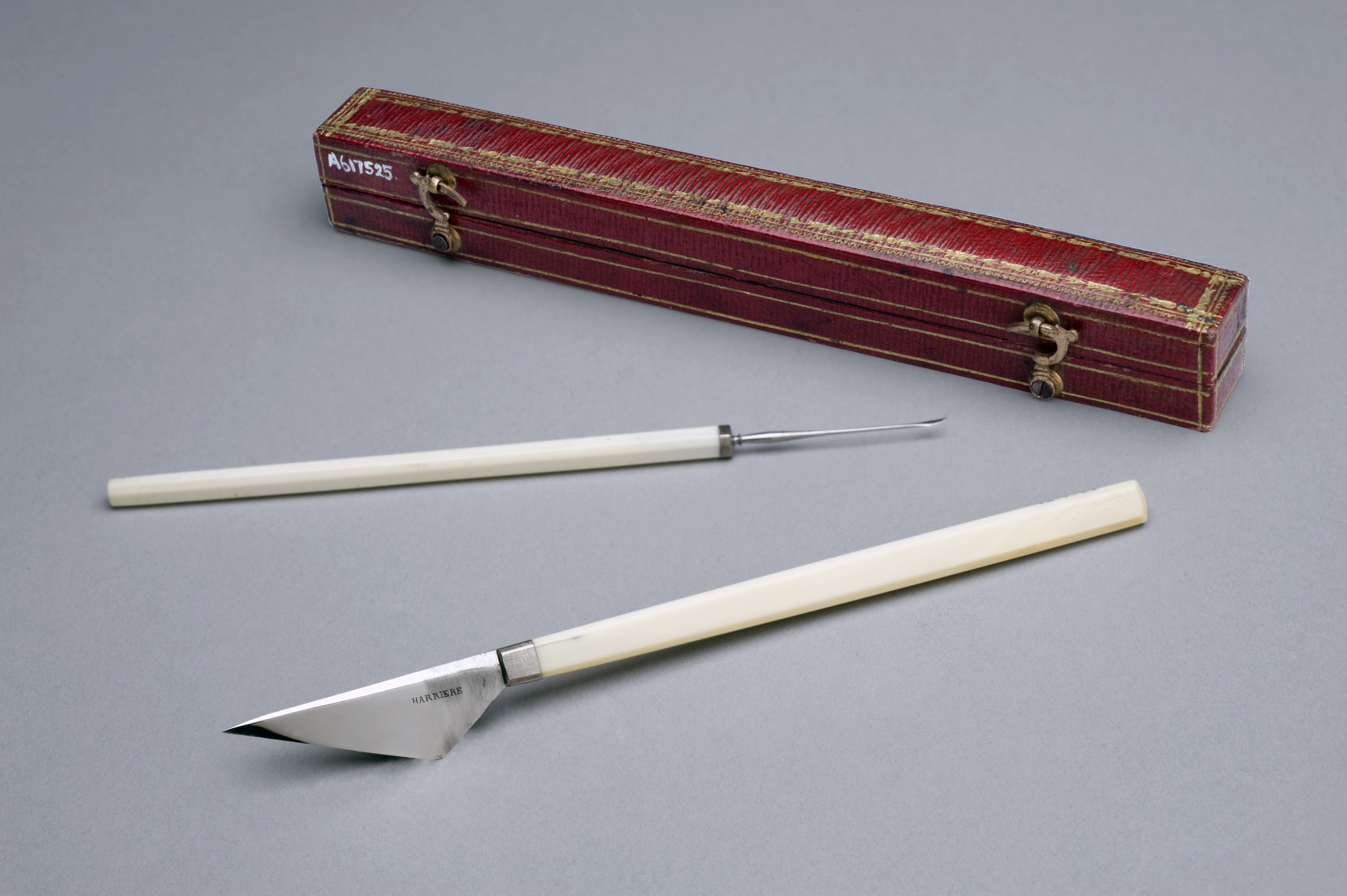
Beer-type cataract knife and needle, cased, Paris, 1820-1866

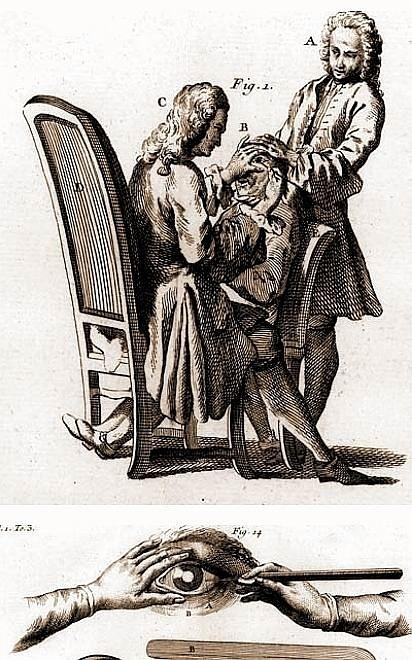
A cataract surgery. Dictionnaire Universel de Médecine (1746–1748)

On Sep. 18, 1750, Jacques Daviel performed the first documented planned primary cataract extraction on a cleric in Cologne, Daviel began animal experiments with cataract extraction in the first week of July 1750, following two other Paris-based surgeons (Jean Baseilhac and Natale Pallucci) who also began work on cataract extraction that same week. Daviel's advance was announced in the Gazette de Cologne of Sep. 22, 1750. In 1753, Samuel Sharp performed the first-recorded surgical removal of the entire lens and lens capsule: the lens was removed from the eye through a limbal incision. In America, cataract couching may have been performed in 1611, while cataract extraction was most likely performed by 1776. Cataract extraction by aspiration of lens material through a tube using suction was performed by Philadelphia-based surgeon Philip Syng Physick in 1815.

King Serfoji II, Bhonsle of Thanjavur, India, reportedly performed cataract surgeries in the early 1800s, according to manuscripts stored in the Saraswathi Mahal Library.

In 1884, Karl Koller became the first surgeon to apply a cocaine solution to the cornea as a local anaesthetic; the news of his discovery spread rapidly but was not without controversy.

== Early-to-mid 20th century ==
At the beginning of the 20th century, the standard surgical procedure was intracapsular cataract extraction (ICCE). The work of Henry Smith, who first developed a safe, fast way to remove the lens within its capsule by external manipulation, was considered particularly influential; the capsule forceps, the discovery of enzymatic zonulysis by Joaquin Barraquer in 1957, and the introduction of cryoextraction of the lens by Tadeusz Krwawicz and Charles Kelman in 1961 continued the development of ICCE. Intracapsular cryoextraction was the favoured form of cataract extraction from the late 1960s to the early 1980s: it consisted in using a liquid-nitrogen-cooled probe tip to freeze the encapsulated lens to the probe. This required a large incision and the cornea to be folded back and the anterior chamber to be drained.

In 1949, Harold Ridley introduced the concept of implantation of the intraocular lens (IOL) after treating a Spitfire pilot who had fragments of acrylic plastic in his eye and realising that, unlike most other foreign material, the eye did not reject acrylic. This made visual rehabilitation after cataract surgery a more efficient, effective, and comfortable process.

Artificial IOLs, which are used to replace the eye's natural lens removed during cataract surgery, increased in popularity after the 1960s and were first approved by the US Food and Drug Administration in 1981. The development of IOLs was considered a notable innovation, as patients previously had to wear very thick glasses, or a special type of contact lens, in order to cope with the removal of their natural lens. IOLs can be used to correct other vision problems, such as toric lenses for correcting astigmatism. IOLs can be classified as monofocal, toric, and multifocal lenses.

Ocular anaesthesia has improved since Alfred Einhorn synthesised procaine in 1905, which was used in retrobulbar anaesthesia.

Peribulbar anaesthesia was introduced in 1980 by Mandal and David. Since the turn of the millennium, sub-Tenon's anaesthesia has come into common use, and by using a blunt cannula to deliver local anaesthetic, the risk of accidentally puncturing the globe is reduced. The more recent tendency is to administer topical local anesthesia without use of a needle.

Also in the 1960s, the development of A-scan ultrasound biometry contributed to provide more accurate predictions of implant refractive strength.

In 1967, Charles Kelman introduced phacoemulsification, which uses ultrasonic energy to emulsify the nucleus of the crystalline lens and remove cataracts by aspiration without a large incision. This method of surgery reduced the need for an extended hospital stay and made out-patient surgery the standard. Patients who undergo cataract surgery rarely complain of pain or discomfort during the procedure, although those who have topical anaesthesia, rather than peribulbar block anaesthesia, may experience some discomfort.

== Late 20th century ==
Ophthalmic viscosurgical devices (OVDs), which were introduced in 1972, facilitate the procedure and improve overall safety. An OVD is a viscoelastic solution, a gel-like substance used to maintain the shape of the eye at reduced pressure as well as to protect the inside structure and tissues of the eye without interfering with the operation.

In 1980, D.M. Colvard made the cataract incision in the sclera, which limited induced astigmatism. In the early 1980s, Danièle Aron-Rosa and colleagues introduced the neodymium-doped yttrium aluminum garnet laser (Nd:YAG laser) for posterior capsulotomy. In 1985, Thomas Mazzocco developed and implanted the first foldable IOL. Graham Barrett and associates pioneered the use of silicone, acrylic, and hydrogel lenses.

According to Cionni et al (2006), Kimiya Shimizu began removing cataracts using topical anaesthesia in the late 1980s, though Davis (2016) attributes the introduction of topical anaesthetics to R.A. Fischman in 1993. In 1987, Blumenthal and Moissiev described the use of a reduced incision size for ECCE. They used a 6.5 to 7 mm (0.26 to 0.28 in) straight scleral tunnel incision 2 mm (0.079 in) behind the limbus with two side ports.

In 1989, M. McFarland introduced a self-sealing incision architecture; in 1990, S.L.Pallin described a chevron-shaped incision that minimized the risk of induced astigmatism; in 1991, J.A. Singer described the frown incision, in which the ends curve away from the limbus, similarly reducing astigmatism. Toric IOLs were introduced in 1992 and are used worldwide to correct corneal astigmatism during cataract surgery; they have been approved by the FDA since 1998. Also in the late 1990s, optical biometry based on partial coherence infrared interferometry was introduced: this technique improves visual resolution, offers much greater precision, and is much quicker and more comfortable than ultrasound.

== 21st century ==
According to surveys of members of the American Society of Cataract and Refractive Surgery, approximately 2.85 million cataract procedures were performed in the United States throughout 2004, while 2.79 million operations were executed in 2005. In 2009, Praputsorn Kosakarn described a method for manual fragmentation of the lens, called "double-nylon loop", which consists in splitting the lens into three pieces for extraction, allowing a smaller, sutureless incision of 4.0 to 5.0 mm (0.16 to 0.20 in), and requires implantation of a foldable IOL. This technique uses less expensive instruments and is suitable for use in developing countries.

As of 2013, medical staffs had access to instruments that use infrared swept-source optical coherence tomography (SS-OCT), a non-invasive, high-speed method that can penetrate dense cataracts and collects thousands of scans per second, with the ultimate goal of generating high-resolution data in 2D or 3D. As of 2021, approximately four million cataract procedures take place annually in the U.S. and nearly 28 million worldwide, a large proportion of which are performed in India; that is about 75,000 procedures per day globally.
