= Relocation of association football teams in the United Kingdom =

Relocation of association football teams in the United Kingdom is a practice which involves an association football team moving from one metropolitan area to another, although occasionally moves between municipalities in the same conurbation are also included. For relocations in other sports see Relocation of sports teams in the United Kingdom; for relocations in other parts of the world see Relocation of professional sports teams.

In British football the relocation of teams away from their traditional districts is unusual because of the nature of the relationship between clubs and their fans: the local football club is regarded by most British football supporters as part of the local identity and social fabric rather than as a business that can be transplanted by its owners at will. As a result, any relocation plan would be strongly opposed by fans in the club's original area, and unlikely to succeed in most new locations due to the existence of established teams in most towns and cities that would already have secured the loyalty of native supporters. John Bale, summarising a study published in 1974, writes that, in the view of most fans, "Chelsea would simply not be Chelsea" were that club to move a few miles within the same borough to Wormwood Scrubs.

However, there have been examples of club relocations, primarily motivated by difficult financial situations or problems with the home ground. So far this article lists 61 relocated teams, 12 clubs with failed relocation proposals, and 19 changes in identity in total in men's football and 13 relocated teams and 10 changes in identity in women's football.

== Association Football (men's) ==
The geographic redistribution of the 92 Football League teams was considered a possible eventuality by some around that time, including Sir Norman Chester, who headed an investigation into the condition of English football in 1968. Before the 1986–87 season, clubs could not be relegated out of the League's Fourth Division. The bottom four clubs had to apply for re-election by the other member clubs at the end of each season, alongside any non-League teams who wished to take their place, but the replacement of an established League side in this way was quite rare. From the inaugural post-war season (1946–47) through to 1985–86, clubs already in the League were supplanted on only six occasions. "New communities have developed ... which lack clubs in League membership", Chester reported, in 1968. "Amalgamations of old clubs would provide vacancies for new clubs to enter the League. Alternatively the movement of established clubs to new communities could provide a way both of saving old clubs and at the same time bringing League football to new and growing areas." Having been established in 1967 as the largest of the "new towns" springing up across southern England and the Midlands, In England, Milton Keynes, the largest of these, provided a clear staging ground for such an experiment: Clyde F.C. (to Cumbernauld) and Livingston F.C. (née Meadowbank Thistle F.C., to Livingston) had already done so in Scotland.

At the end of the 1978–79 season, 20 leading non-League clubs left the Southern League and the Northern Premier League to form the Alliance Premier League. This national non-League division started in the 1979–80 season and renamed itself the Football Conference in 1986. Since the 1986–87 season, the champions of the Conference have received promotion to the Football League, with the League's bottom club being relegated to the Conference in exchange. This was expanded to the Conference champions and the winners of a promotion play-off before the 2002–03 season, with the worst two League clubs being relegated. The situation of the Football League "closed shop", which for nearly a century effectively barred most non-League clubs from accession, therefore no longer exists.

According to the Football League's statement to the independent commission on Wimbledon F.C. in May 2002, the English League "had allowed temporary relocations for good reasons outside 'conurbations' in respect of certain clubs where it was intended the club would return, but there has been no previous occasion on which the Football League had granted permission to a club to relocate permanently to a ground outside its 'conurbation'." Clubs in the English professional ranks that have relocated to other locales within their traditional conurbations include Manchester United and Woolwich Arsenal, who moved 5 miles (8 km) and 10 miles (16 km) respectively in 1910 and 1913. (Note: Manchester United moved from Clayton, 3 miles (4.8 km) east of central Manchester, to Old Trafford, 2 miles (3.2 km) south-west, in 1910. Woolwich Arsenal migrated from Woolwich in south-east London to Highbury in the north of the city in 1913, and dropped "Woolwich" from their name the following year.) South Shields of the Third Division North relocated 8 miles (13 km) west to Gateshead in 1930 and renamed themselves Gateshead A.F.C. The commission reported that there was no Football League precedent for a move between conurbations, but stressed that there was direct precedent for such a move in Scotland.

=== Relocations of teams which assumed new identities ===
==== Chessington United → Mole Valley Predators ====
Chessington United merged with two youth teams, Predators F.C. and Fetcham Park United, and changed their name to Mole Valley Predators F.C. in 2005. They relocated from Chessington to Leatherhead, Surrey.

==== Clydebank F.C. → Airdrie United F.C. ====
Clydebank F.C. in 2002 was taken over by Airdrie United F.C. and played their games at Airdrie following the earlier liquidation of Airdrieonians, though the club was founded as a continuation of Airdrieonians and did not take over Clydebank until after their application for the old Airdrie club's league place was refused. As a result, Airdrie United were placed in the Second Division for the 2002–03 season, taking the place that would have been occupied by Clydebank. A year later, the Clydebank fans founded a new club, bearing the same name. In 2013, Airdrie United, with the approval of the Scottish Football Association, changed their name to Airdrieonians.

==== Distillery F.C. → Lisburn Distillery F.C. ====
Distillery F.C. started in Belfast, Northern Ireland, then were homeless for many seasons in the 1970s sharing grounds with other clubs until settling in Ballyskeagh, near Lisburn, later adding the latter town's name to theirs, now known as Lisburn Distillery F.C.

==== Emley F.C. → Wakefield & Emley F.C. → Wakefield F.C. ====
After a poor to average couple of seasons in the late 90s, it emerged that Emley A.F.C. (1903) were looking to leave the village. This was due to ground regulation gradings. The League brought in new regulations, concerning three-sided grounds, that meant Emley would be thrown out of the league unless they spent vast amounts upgrading. The club was unable to expand their ground and were forced to look for a new one. A ground share with Rugby league club Wakefield Trinity Wildcats was suggested, then the club played a couple of games at Wakefield's Belle Vue ground. Although primarily a rugby city, the club moved to Wakefield's Belle Vue for their home games in the 2000–01 season.

In the close of 2002 season the club decided to renamed itself Wakefield & Emley F.C. This alienated some of the village supporters as the club frequently began to be referred to as simply "Wakefield". 2003–04 saw Wakefield & Emley's worst ever season in senior football, they finished bottom of the Northern Premier League Premier Division.

The club changed its name once again in the 2004–05 season, this time to Wakefield–Emley F.C. In the close season Northern Counties East League disbanded its reserve division. The Wakefield-Emley reserve team had continued in that division when the first team were promoted to the NPL. They also continued to play at the old Welfare Ground in Emley. With the loss of the league, some former officials of the club decided to form a new club—A.F.C. Emley.

As there was now a new club in Emley, the board decided to drop the name "Emley" and continued on as Wakefield F.C.; the club changed colours and moved to College Grove in Wakefield, becoming fully a Wakefield club.

Wakefield F.C. was wound up in June 2014, and AFC Emley was renamed as Emley A.F.C. in the summer of 2019.

==== Horwich RMI F.C. → Leigh RMI ====
Horwich RMI F.C., was founded in 1896 in Horwich. During the 1994–95 season, the club realised their ground Grundy Hill would not be able to help the clubs' prospects of achieving success up the football pyramid, made the decision to move from Horwich seven miles south to Hilton Park in Leigh, home of the rugby league club Leigh Centurions. As part of this deal, a new company, Grundy Hill Estates, was formed to take over the ownership of the shared ground. Once the move had been finalised and agreements had been made to share the 10,000 capacity stadium, the club officially changed their name to Leigh RMI to reflect their new surroundings. RMI lost its first match at Hilton Park in March 1995 to Boston United 4–0, and ended up being relegated at the end of the 1995 season. Its name was changed again in June 2008 when the club became Leigh Genesis F.C.

==== Negretti and Zambra F.C. → Stocklake F.C. ====
Negretti and Zambra F.C. was established in the 1930s, a works team for the Negretti and Zambra company in the King's Cross area of London. When the company relocated to the Stocklake Industrial Estate in Aylesbury in 1949, facilities were set up for the sports teams and the club joined the Aylesbury & District League in 1954. The company later sold the sports facilities to the council, at which point the club was renamed Stocklake F.C. The club underwent mergers and several name changes and are now known as Aylesbury F.C.

==== Runcorn F.C. → Runcorn F.C. Halton ====
Founded in 1918 as Highfield and Camden Tanneries Recreation Club, the club renamed a year later to become Runcorn F.C., after its home town Runcorn.

In 1993–94, the club's stadium nearly fell apart; a perimeter wall collapsed during a cup game against Hull City, the roof blew off one stand, and the main stand was destroyed by a fire. This crippled the club, which was relegated in 1996 for the first time ever. In 2000, they sold the Canal Street ground where they had played since 1918, and moved to the 11,000-seat Halton Stadium in Widnes, which was also used by the town's rugby team and Everton reserves. The club renamed itself Runcorn FC Halton to reflect its new location.

In 2005 the club's precarious financial state caused them to move out of the Halton Stadium permanently, having finished the previous season at Southport's Haig Avenue, and to share Valerie Park, home of local rivals Prescot Cables, who also played in the Northern Premier League.

During its final season in 2006 the club went into severe financial crisis and was unable to pay its players' wages, forcing it to offload many of its key playing staff and replace them with amateur players used to playing at a much lower standard. This made for an embarrassing end to the season, with Runcorn finishing bottom and frequently suffering defeats by five or more goals and after a second successive relegation, the club's future was in doubt, and the decision was made to officially confirm its resignation from the league and cease activity.

==== South Liverpool F.C. (1890s) → New Brighton A.F.C. ====
South Liverpool F.C. founded in the late 19th century relocated in 1921 to the seaside resort of New Brighton, Merseyside and the club became New Brighton A.F.C. South Liverpool's supporters who were unhappy with the situation founded a new team of the same name in 1935.

==== South Shields F.C. (1889) → Gateshead F.C. ====
South Shields F.C. was the first and most successful of three clubs from South Shields which bore the same name. After two unsuccessful seasons in the lower division, the struggling club took the step of not just leaving the Horsley Hill ground but of moving the club to another town in search of more support. Newcastle upon Tyne, was mentioned as a possible destination, but Gateshead was eventually chosen, mainly due to the enthusiastic support of the Gateshead Council. The club folded in 1930 and was taken over in its entirety by Gateshead F.C. (who later liquidated in 1973). Back in South Shields, a phoenix club of the same name was founded.

==== South Shields F.C. (1936) → Gateshead United ====
South Shields F.C. was a phoenix club of a club of the same name which moved to Gateshead. However, repeating the same migration of its predecessor, in 1974 the club became Gateshead United F.C. after a move between the two towns that are 10 miles apart. The club folded in 1973, the present Gateshead F.C., founded in 1977 and South Shields F.C. founded in 1974, are new clubs.

=== Relocation of teams to New Towns ===
Several examples of relocation in the UK focus on the phenomenon of New Towns, built to cope with the shortage of housing following the Second World War. Many of these towns had large populations, but lacked professional football teams due to their age. Also, some clubs that did not move changed their names to reflect the creation of nearby new towns.

==== 1st Bangor Old Boys ====
1st Bangor Old Boys F.C. originally from Bangor, are now based at the Drome in Newtownards.

==== Clyde F.C. ====
Promotion and relegation in and out of the Scottish Professional Football League was not introduced until the league system's reorganisation in 2014; until then it was nearly impossible for sides outside the League to join. Scottish League membership therefore remained largely restricted to well-established localities as opposed to new towns.

Clyde F.C. were evicted from Shawfield Stadium (at Rutherglen in the south-east of Glasgow) in 1986. They were homeless and had to groundshare for almost a decade. By 1990, Clyde secured an agreement to build a home of their own in the new town of Cumbernauld, 16 miles (26 km) to the North-East of the city, which had grown in population and was by then one of the largest settlements in Scotland without senior football; Broadwood Stadium was built in 1994. The move allowed Clyde to continue as a semi-professional club (retaining their original identity, although now based 10 miles (16 km) from the River Clyde as opposed to a few yards away as throughout the rest of their history).

In April 2022, the club announced they would be leaving Broadwood at the end of the 2021–22 season, ending their 28-year stay in Cumbernauld. They will ground-share with Hamilton Academical at New Douglas Park from the start of the 2022–23 season, with a view of relocating to a new home back in Glasgow in the near future.

==== Meadowbank Thistle → Livingston F.C. ====
A year after Clyde's move, Meadowbank Thistle, a struggling Edinburgh club in the fourth tier controversially relocated in 1995 to the new town of Livingston in West Lothian, 19 miles (31 km) to the west, amid some fans' protests. The club changed its name to Livingston F.C., fortunes improved and they climbed through the divisions, playing in the UEFA Cup and winning the Scottish League Cup in 2004. After being demoted to the bottom tier for financial issues, Livi reached the Scottish Premiership again by the end of the 2010s and stayed there until the 2023-24 season.

==== Wellington Town → Telford United ====
Wellington Town F.C. never relocated, but changed its name in 1969 to Telford United, after the new town of Telford (formed in 1963) was expanded to include the club's home of Wellington. The club went into administration and was dissolved in 2004, but was re-founded the same year as A.F.C. Telford United.

==== Wimbledon F.C. → MK Dons ====
The Norwegian owners of Wimbledon F.C. proposed to move the club from South London to Milton Keynes in 2001. The proposal received FA approval in 2002. Those Wimbledon fans who were unhappy with the proposal withdrew their support and created a new team called AFC Wimbledon; Wimbledon F.C. went into administration in 2003. The club was bought out of administration by Inter MK Ltd., transferred to Milton Keynes and subsequently renamed Milton Keynes Dons F.C. in 2004. Twelve years before the move to Milton Keynes, Wimbledon had already left their London borough of Merton home for Selhurst Park in (the London borough of) Croydon. Plans to move Wimbledon F.C. had been discussed as early as 1979.

=== Relocations of teams within a conurbation which assumed new identities ===
Other examples of relocation out of the original district are slightly more common, especially in the clubs' early histories. In certain cases, the club has moved within a conurbation.

==== Milford Everton → Armagh City ====
Armagh City F.C. was founded in 1964 as Milford Everton F.C. in the village of Milford, just outside Armagh city, but changed their name in 1988 on relocation to Armagh. The club played at the Mill Field, Armagh from 1988 to 1993, when it moved to its current home, Holm Park.

==== Woolwich Arsenal → Arsenal F.C. ====
Arsenal was founded at Woolwich in 1886. But In 1889, Woolwich became part of London, with the formation of London County Council. Arsenal moved from Woolwich in south London to Highbury in north London in 1913. They moved again to Holloway, a neighbourhood adjacent to Highbury, in 2006, though this was a much shorter distance than they had moved when relocating 93 years earlier, and kept the club in the London Borough of Islington.

==== Mitchell Shackleton → Irlam F.C. ====
Formed as Mitchell Shackleton F.C. in October 1969 by a group of employees working for Mitchell, Shackleton and Company Limited, the club was initially headquartered at the Oddfellows Arms, Patricroft, before moving to St Michael's Community Centre, Peel Green in 1973. The start of 2001–02 season saw the club change its name to Irlam Mitchell Shackleton F.C. in anticipation of its relocation to Silver Street, Irlam. In 2006 the team dropped the Mitchell Shackleton suffix to become Irlam F.C. Both Patricroft and Peel Green are areas of Eccles, Greater Manchester. Both Irlam and Eccles are now part of the City of Salford, although both were historically a part of Lancashire.

==== Newton Heath → Manchester United ====
Manchester United were founded (as Newton Heath) in the Manchester neighbourhood of Newton Heath in 1878, and moved within the city to Clayton in 1893. After adopting the Manchester United name in 1902, they moved just outside the city to Stretford in 1910 to then a new stadium Old Trafford and have stayed there ever since.

==== Thames Ironworks → West Ham United ====
West Ham United have been located in what is now the London Borough of Newham since their creation as Thames Ironworks F.C. in 1895, but played in several different neighbourhoods within that area in their early history. Their first home was Hermit Road in Canning Town, followed by Browning Road in East Ham, before returning to Canning Town at the Memorial Grounds. After severing ties with the Thames Ironworks company and reforming as West Ham United in 1900, they initially played at the Memorial Grounds, but became a transient team in 1901, playing at several local clubs' grounds in another nearby neighbourhood, Upton Park. In 1904, they built the Boleyn Ground in Upton Park, where they remained until moving into the Olympic Stadium, located in the Newham neighbourhood of Stratford and now known as London Stadium, starting with the 2016–17 season.

==== North Withington Amateur → Wythenshawe Town ====
North Withington Amateur F.C. was established in 1946 by attendees of St Crispin's Church in nearby Fallowfield, on the border with Withington. The club played at Hough End Field on Princess Road until 1974, with their headquarters in the Princess Hotel. They then moved to a new ground on Timpson Road in the Baguley area of Wythenshawe, where three prefab houses were converted into a clubhouse. The club was renamed Wythenshawe Town and the ground was named the Ericstan Stadium after founder members Eric Renard and Stan Hahn. The two are also remembered in the club badge, which includes a fox (Renard in French) and cockerel (Hänchen in German).

=== Relocations of teams within a conurbation without change in name or identity ===
Relocation out of the original district are becoming frequent due to urbanisation and growth of many conurbations. One upcoming relocation will move an existing club to the area that its fanbase considers as its spiritual home.

==== Barnet F.C. ====
Barnet F.C.'s old home ground of Underhill Stadium, had a capacity of 6,023. It was also used by Arsenal F.C. Reserves. Barnet were also involved in an annual friendly fixture with Arsenal F.C. with the former benefiting from its gate receipts. It was thought that Barnet would move from Underhill at the end of the 2011–12 season to an unknown location due to a dispute about the contract lease on Underhill with Barnet Council, but stayed until the end of the 2012–13 season.

In July 2012 Harrow Council agreed the development of a new stadium called The Hive Stadium at the Prince Edward Playing Fields which the club can use for a period of up to 10 years. In February 2013, Barnet's move to the new ground was ratified by The Football League.

==== Bedford Town ====
Bedford Town F.C. played at London Road in 1886, before playing most of its matches at Bedford Park between 1887 and 1890. They then moved to a ground located off London Road.

After being reformed in 1908, the club started playing at a site off London Road, before moving to the Queens Park football ground in Queens Park during October. The pitch was originally between Havelock Street and Lawrence Street, before they moved to one at the end of Nelson Street. There were initially no spectator facilities, with duckboards only put down in November 1911. During World War I the ground was used by the Army, and it was still in use in 1919 when the club started playing again. As a result, they played on the playing fields of County School until being able to return to Queens Park in December 1919.

In 1982 the club's lease on Queens Park was terminated and after a proposed new ground in the Barkers Lane area failed to come to fruition, the club folded. When the club re-formed in 1989, they initially played on public pitches in Queens Park, before finding a site in Cardington to build a new ground. The New Eyrie opened on 6 August 1993 with a friendly match against Peterborough United attracting what remains the ground's record attendance of 3,000. It has a capacity of 3,000, of which 300 is seated and 1,000 covered. The ground is located next to McMullen Park, the home ground of local rivals Bedford.

==== Bolton Wanderers ====
Bolton Wanderers play at the University of Bolton Stadium, which is situated in Horwich, part of the Metropolitan Borough of Bolton, since their relocation from 101-year-old Burnden Park in 1997.

==== Grimsby Town ====
Grimsby Town play in the town of Cleethorpes, a town to the east of Grimsby that has been absorbed by the former's outward growth during the 20th century.

==== Kingstonian ====
Kingstonian F.C. remained at Richmond Road for most of the 20th century, it thus being referred to as the club's 'traditional home'. The maintenance of the site increasingly became more than the club's income could support and parts of the site were sold off for redevelopment; the 'Kingstonian petrol station' occupying much of the Richmond Road frontage since 1956, and the former running track and reserve pitch redeveloped for housing in the 1970s. The club eventually sold the site and moved out of Richmond Road in 1988. The stadium was demolished after 1989 and the remainder of the site redeveloped for housing.

After a season and a half ground-sharing at Hampton F.C.'s Beveree ground, Kingstonian opened their new Kingsmeadow Stadium (on the site of the old Norbiton Sports Ground owned by Kingston Council) in August 1989.

After financial mismanagement and over-spending in a chase for success, Kingstonian entered administration to avoid bankruptcy and lost the Kingsmeadow lease in October 2001. It was assigned in April 2002 by the administrators to a property developer, Rajesh Khosla, who was also by then owner of the club. AFC Wimbledon were already sub-tenants at Kingsmeadow, before raising £2.4 million to buy the lease from Khosla in June 2003, with a view to making Kingsmeadow their home in the short term until their intended move to a site in Wimbledon became feasible for them. Kingstonian secured a 25-year sub-tenancy agreement with AFC Wimbledon, with customary break clauses. The clubs operated a ground-sharing arrangement, with Kingstonian receiving preferentially cheap rental terms. In 2015, AFC Wimbledon agreed plans to sell Kingsmeadow to Chelsea in order to help finance their plans to move back to a new stadium in Wimbledon. Chelsea have stated that they wish to use Kingsmeadow for their own youth and women's teams and are not willing to accommodate Kingstonian. On 22 February 2017, Kingstonian announced that they will be sharing Leatherhead F.C.'s ground at Fetcham Grove for the 2017–18 season. On 16 January 2018, Kingstonian announced they would be on the move once more, this time to King George's Field in Tolworth to share with Corinthian-Casuals F.C. starting in the 2018–19 season.

The sale was detrimental to Kingstonian, as the ground is too big and expensive for a non-league side.

==== Nottingham Forest ====
Nottingham Forest have long played outside of the Forest district of Nottingham and now reside in West Bridgford, currently just outside Nottingham's city limits, although they retain a Nottingham postal address.

==== Partick Thistle ====
Partick Thistle is a Scottish football club that moved in 1909 from Partick (then a separate burgh but soon swallowed up by Glasgow) to the city district of Maryhill, but retains its name.

==== Sheffield FC ====
Sheffield F.C., considered the oldest football club in the world, currently plays in the Horses and Coach ground in Dronfield, across the county boundary in Derbyshire. During their peak in the mid-19th century they played at venues in Sheffield such as Sheaf House and Bramall Lane.

==== Wealdstone ====
Wealdstone left their original Lower Mead ground in Harrow in 1991 due to financial difficulties and have not played in their home borough since. The club initially entered into a groundsharing agreement at Watford's Vicarage Road which lasted up until 1993, before going on to groundshare with Yeading F.C., Edgware Town F.C. and Northwood F.C.

In 2003, the club attempted to return to Harrow by redeveloping the disused Prince Edward Playing Fields site in Canons Park with view to building a new ground there, however the project was halted after a year due to the company who Wealdstone were working with on the project becoming insolvent. The site was eventually sold to Barnet F.C. and became The Hive Stadium. In 2008, Wealdstone moved into the Grosvenor Vale Stadium in Ruislip after 17 years without a permanent home. The ground is based in the London Borough of Hillingdon and is over 5 miles away from Wealdstone's original Lower Mead ground.

=== Temporary relocations without change in name or identity ===
There have also been examples of temporary relocations, with the club either moving back or still planning to, however the clubs have kept their original historic names. Some relocations, although considered temporary, are for an indefinite amount of time.

==== Ards F.C. ====
Ards F.C. is based in Newtownards, but plays its home matches at Clandeboye Park in Bangor, which it rents from rivals Bangor to play home games.

They were forced to sell their Castlereagh Park home in 1998 to try to reduce their crippling debts. The stadium remained well tended for another three years while ambitious plans for a new ground further down the road were developed. In 2002 Castlereagh Park was demolished, as planned. Ards hoped to play at a new community-owned site, a stone's throw from Castlereagh Park that was due to be developed in 2010 by the local council. This plan has since been shelved, and they are still the nomads of Northern Irish football. During the time since Ards left Castleragh Park, they have shared football grounds at Cliftonville's Solitude and Carrick Rangers' Taylors Avenue, their rivals Bangor's ground, Clandeboye Park and Ballyclare Comrades' ground, Dixon Park.

Plans were under-way to develop Londonderry Park as the new grounds for the team. Planning officials gave Ards Borough Council the go-ahead on the £3.8 million plan in October 2010.

In 2009, supporters launched a campaign, 'Bring Ards FC Home', in which they publicised the need in the media and had discussions with politicians. Back as far as November 2008, the council had discussed the need for a new Ards stadium. It was decided in April 2009 that Londonderry Park, on the Portaferry Road in Newtownards, was the best option and the Ards Council accepted the tender for redevelopment of the site in September 2010. Plans included upgrades to the existing grass surfaces and the addition of new synthetic surfaces, and to allow for the possibility of future upgrading to meet regulations should the need arise. The ground would have also continued to provide facilities for hockey and cricket.

However, in August 2012 it was announced that Ards Borough Council would not be proceeding with the new stadium, and the plans were shelved.

In 2016, there were proposed new plans for a stadium to be built on the grounds of Movilla High School.

==== Aylesbury United ====
Aylesbury United played at Turnfurlong Lane until moving to Buckingham Road in the mid-1980s. In July 2006 the lease on the ground expired and they were forced to play matches outside the town. They played at the Meadow in Chesham (groundsharing with Chesham United, before moving to Bell Close in Leighton Buzzard in 2009, where they shared with Leighton Town. In 2015 they began a groundshare at Thame United's Meadow View Park.

==== Biggleswade Town ====
In 2006 Biggleswade Town F.C. left Fairfield Road and groundshared with Bedford United & Valerio, Bedford, whilst a new ground was built on Langford Road, Biggleswade. The new ground, named the Carlsberg Stadium for sponsorship purposes, was opened for the start of the 2008–09 season. The ground has a capacity of 3,000, of which 300 is seated.

==== Billingham Synthonia ====
In April 2017 Billingham Synthonia F.C. left the Central Avenue Stadium in Billingham due to the cost of upgrading works, initially agreeing to use the Norton Sports Complex in Norton for two seasons.

==== Bracknell Town ====
At the end of the 2020–21 season Bracknell Town F.C. moved from their hometown of Bracknell to Sandhurst Town's Bottom Meadow ground.

==== Brantwood F.C. ====
Brantwood F.C. was formed in 1901 and named after Brantwood Street, the club first played at the Glen, Alexandra Park Avenue. From 1920 until 1930 they played at Dunmore Park. After 1930, Brantwood were unable to secure an extension to the lease at Dunmore Park and became homeless. For the next 22 years they played at various venues, including Ligoniel, Whiteabbey, Donaldson Crescent, Oldpark Avenue, Greencastle, York Park and another four-year spell at Dunmore. The club eventually bought its own ground and opened Skegoneill Avenue in 1952.

==== Cambridge City ====
Cambridge City F.C. traditional home ground is the City Ground (also known as "Milton Road"), where they played from 29 April 1922 until 27 April 2013. It is located in the Chesterton area of the city, approximately 0.62 miles (1 km) north of the Cambridge city centre. The original ground was one of the largest outside the football league and was estimated to have a capacity in excess of 16,000, although the highest recorded attendance was 12,058 (in 1950). In the mid 80's, part of the land the original ground stood on was sold for redevelopment, with a new ground built on the remaining land. The capacity of the second ground was approximately 3,000 with 700 seats.

The club was in a legal dispute with their landlords over the ground, which was sold by a previous board of directors for less than its market value. The High Court ruled that the club had been fraudulently misrepresented, and the club will receive 50% of the development profits on the site.

In February 2010, Cambridge City announced a three-year ground-share with Newmarket Town at their Cricket Field Road ground in Newmarket, approximately 13 miles away, for the 2010–11 season. The ground was deemed to need work to bring it up to the required standard, and Cambridge City were to use this time to seek a permanent home closer to Cambridge. The groundshare was later deferred several times, and in April 2013, it was announced that the club had agreed a 2-year groundshare with local neighbours Histon, with City sharing Bridge Road in Impington from the beginning of the 2013–14 season.

In 2012, it was announced that the club's president, Len Satchell, had purchased 35 acres of land in Sawston, with a view to building the club a new 3,000-seat stadium, alongside community facilities for Sawston and the surrounding villages. Following public consultation and an appeal over the decision to grant Planning Permission, Len Satchell has stated their intention to go ahead with the development (May 2016).

On 30 March 2015, it was announced that the club had reached a groundshare agreement with St Ives Town for the use of St Ives' Westwood Road stadium.

==== Canterbury City ====
Canterbury City F.C. originally played at the Kingsmead Stadium, but were evicted by the council in 2001. The stadium closed in 1999 and was demolished, making way for a residential development. In the first seasons after reforming, they initially played in Bridge, before moving to the Recreation Ground in Hersden for the 2009–10 season. After the start of the 2010–11 season the club arranged an ongoing groundshare agreement to play their home matches at Herne Bay's Winch's Field ground. At the beginning of the 2014–15 season City moved to Ashford United's Homelands ground. They played at Deal Town's Charles Sports Ground in 2017–18, before moving to Salters Lane, the home ground of Faversham Town, for the 2018–19 season.

==== Carlisle United ====
In November and December 2015, after severe flooding in Northern England, Carlisle United had to play their home matches at Preston's Deepdale Stadium and Blackburn's Ewood Park, after Brunton Park was completely flooded.

==== Charlton Athletic ====
Charlton Athletic play at The Valley in Charlton, where they have played since 1919, apart from one year in Catford, during 1923–24, and seven years at Crystal Palace and West Ham United between 1985 and 1992.

==== Coventry City ====
Coventry City relocated to Northampton and spent the 2013–14 season ground sharing with Northampton Town due to Arena Coventry Limited, who manage the Ricoh Arena, not being willing to negotiate with the club to agree a new lease. The club's move sparked widespread protests, boycotts and anger at the club's relocation. With an uncertain return to Coventry, the club played at the Sixfields Stadium, although Walsall's Bescot Stadium was also considered. On 21 August 2014 it was announced an agreement had been reached allowing the club to return to the Ricoh Arena for the next two years with the option of another two years. Coventry City's first home game at the Ricoh Arena was played against Gillingham on 5 September 2014. On 7 June 2019 it was reported that talks between SISU and Wasps had again broken down meaning that Coventry would have to play their 2019–20 "home" matches at Birmingham City's St Andrew's ground, effectively relocating to Birmingham as a result.

==== Dartford F.C. ====
Dartford F.C., in the wake of the Bradford City stadium fire and the Hillsborough disaster, Dartford, like so many clubs, needed to either relocate or upgrade their current facilities with the Board going for the latter option. Large sums of money were spent on planning and design fees, which burdened a manageable financial deficit with crippling interest charges.

At the same time Maidstone United, who had sold their own ground, needed a suitable home to launch the ill-fated foray into the Football League and the Dartford board agreed to let Maidstone ground-share at Watling Street, the rent income providing a welcome boost for finances. The ground share began at the start of the 1988–89 season, at the end of which Maidstone reached the Football League as Football Conference champions.

However, Maidstone United went bankrupt and had to resign from the league in August 1992, most of their cash being taken up to gain the eagerly sought Football League place. Ground improvements, which Maidstone United had paid for, were sold to Dartford at a cost (around £500,000), which pushed Darts' debts beyond manageable proportions. Watling Street was sold to pay off creditors and Dartford withdrew from the Southern League four games into the 1992–93 season.

In 1993 the club was offered a ground-share arrangement by Cray Wanderers, meaning Dartford were able to make a successful application for membership of the Kent League. With a view to the future, Dartford negotiated a ground-share with Welling United and played home games at the Park View ground from the 1994–95 season. In September 1997 a disastrous fire at Erith & Belvedere's Park View ground put the club's future and standing with the Southern League into serious doubt. A new ground sharing arrangement was made with Purfleet in time for the 1998–99 season.

The club moved closer to the borough with a new arrangement to play home matches at Gravesend & Northfleet's (now Ebbsfleet United) Stonebridge Road ground from the 2000–01 season. The ground-sharing agreement at Gravesend & Northfleet, coupled with an upturn in performances on the field, saw a significant increase in attendances to help the financial position of the club.

On 10 April 2004 Dartford Borough Council announced it would provide funding and a site for the building of a stadium in Dartford in time for the 2006–07 season. Construction work began on 14 November 2005. Dartford played their first game at new stadium Princes Park on 11 November 2006, less than 12 months after building work began. They beat Horsham YMCA 4–2 in front of an all ticket capacity crowd of 4097.

==== Durham City ====
Durham City A.F.C. played at Ferens Park, Durham, until the end of the 1993–94 season. During the 1994–95 season they played at Chester-le-Street Town's Moor Park in Chester-le-Street, before moving to New Ferens Park in 1995. However, a dispute with the landlord led to the club moving to Consett's Belle View Stadium in Consett in 2015, where they played until the end of the 2016–17 season. They then moved to Willington's Hall Lane ground in Willington.

==== East Stirlingshire F.C. ====
East Stirlingshire F.C. relocated to Stenhousemuir to Ochilview Park which is the home ground of local rivals Stenhousemuir. After leaving Firs Park in 2008, the club entered a ground-share agreement with Stenhousemuir, intended to be for a period of five years during which the club planned to develop a new stadium in Falkirk. In May 2014 East Stirlingshire FC entered into a partnership with LK Galaxy Sports and others to develop a new playing facility at the former BP Club site at Little Kerse, Grange Road, Grangemouth. The site will also host other sports in due course. Planning has recently been approved by Falkirk Council.

Historically, the club's first ground was outside Falkirk itself, Merchiston Park was located in the industrial village of Bainsford, approximately 1 mile (1.6 km) north of Falkirk. It was situated on the northern bank of the Forth and Clyde Canal near to present day Main Street in Bainsford, which is now a suburb of Falkirk. In 1921 the club moved to Firs Park was located to the south of the canal in the centre of Falkirk, named after the street in which it was situated, Firs Street.

==== Enfield F.C. ====
Enfield F.C. in 1999, sold its Southbury Road stadium, and began ground sharing with several nearby clubs. Eventually, the board decided on a long term ground share with Boreham Wood F.C., 10 miles away at Meadow Park. The relocation sparked protest and in protest some supporters formed splinter phoenix club Enfield Town F.C.

In 2007 the club folded and reformed as Enfield 1893 F.C., as the club still struggled to find a lasting home in Enfield, when the fans choose not to merge with the splinter club Enfield Town F.C., which emerged in 2001. The new club was based in Ware for the 2007–08 and 2008–09 seasons, then moved to Broxbourne, Hertfordshire for the 2009–10 season, before returning to the borough of Enfield after an 11-year absence when they moved to Goldsdown Road in 2010, the former home of Brimsdown Rovers who folded in 2010, In 2014, the club has had to leave the borough again due to the ground falling below the grading required due to a dispute between Goldsdown Sports Ltd the ground's owner and the local council, and now play their matches in Harlow, Essex, sharing with Harlow Town F.C.

==== Enfield Town ====
Enfield Town F.C., founded in 2001 as a fan-owned splinter club of Enfield F.C. after it sold its Southbury Road Stadium in 1999, with the aim to "keep football in Enfield", although Enfield F.C. continued to exist until 2007. The club began play ing at Brimsdown Rovers' Goldsdown Road ground, later joined by Enfield 1893, Enfield F.C.'s phoenix club founded in 2007. In October 2008, Enfield Council announced a deal with the club allowing the club to relocate to the Queen Elizabeth Stadium, close to Enfield's old Southbury Road ground. At the end of the 2009–10 season the club was awarded a grant of £81,504 by the Football Stadium Improvement Fund towards the first phase of works on the new ground.

They left Goldsdown Road at the end of the 2010–11 season, taking with them much of the ground's infrastructure, which resulted in Enfield 1893, who had won the Essex Senior League, not being able to take promotion to the Isthmian League as the ground no longer met the league's standards. After spending the first few months of the 2011–12 stadium groundsharing at the Cheshunt Stadium in Cheshunt, they moved into the Queen Elizabeth Stadium in November 2011.

==== F.C. United of Manchester ====
Despite their spiritual home being Manchester, F.C. United of Manchester did not have their own home ground during the first decade after their formation. Instead, they ground-shared Gigg Lane with Bury F.C., in Bury between 2005 and 2014. Also as a result of some fixture clashes, F.C. United used a further six stadia for home fixtures; Altrincham's Moss Lane in 2005–06, Radcliffe Borough's Stainton Park in 2007–08, Hyde United's Ewen Fields in 2009–10, Stalybridge Celtic's Bower Fold in 2010–11, 2011–12 and 2012–13 and Curzon Ashton's Tameside Stadium in 2011–12 and 2014–15. A Manchester Premier Cup tie at home to Flixton was switched to Flixton's Valley Road ground in 2008 making it technically F.C. United's seventh home ground.

In March 2010, the club announced plans to build their own 5,000-capacity football ground in Newton Heath, the original home of Manchester United. The development was planned to be located on the site of the current Ten Acres Lane sports centre and would have cost £3.5 million, to be financed by public donations, a Community Shares issue and grant funding. However a year later, in March 2011, Manchester City Council backed out from funding the stadium, but that they had pledged to help F.C. United build a stadium in a new location with reduced costs. In April 2011 it was revealed that F.C. United were considering a new site in the Broadhurst Park area of Moston, Manchester. Detailed information about the new facility, including the tentative name Moston Community Stadium, was released in June 2011. Manchester City Council approved the planning permission for the Moston site on 27 October 2011. F.C. United had to overcome some obstacles including funding agreements, contractor and lease negotiations and a legal challenge from local residents which caused a further two-year delay before building commenced in November 2013.

Since their Broadhurst Park ground was not ready in time for the 2014–15 season, F.C. United ended their groundsharing agreement with Bury and began using Bower Fold as a temporary home. Due to fixture clashes with Stalybridge Celtic, the Northern Premier League agreed in December for another switch to Curzon Ashton's Tameside Stadium until Broadhurst Park was granted a safety certificate. F.C. United finally moved into their own home ground at Broadhurst Park for the start of the 2015–16 season.

==== Gateshead F.C. ====
Gateshead F.C. moved to Filtrona Park, South Shields, ground-sharing with South Shields F.C. in April 2003 when the International Stadium was out of bounds due to the installation of a new athletics track. The club promptly returned to Gateshead after the work was finished.

==== Gloucester City ====
Gloucester City A.F.C. has a long history of relocations, although the majority of them within the conurbation of the City of Gloucester. However, after their Meadow Park Stadium was destroyed in the 2007 flood, the club has since played in other towns. Their first season in exile was spent at The New Lawn in Nailsworth, ground-sharing with Forest Green Rovers. between 2008 and 2010 the club played at The Corinium Stadium, Cirencester, home of Cirencester Town F.C. The club currently plays at Whaddon Road, Cheltenham, sharing with league club Cheltenham Town F.C. The club is still hoping to return to Gloucester, and on 7 October 2014, after seven years in exile, the club plans for a new stadium at Meadow Park have been approved by Gloucester City Council. On 25 March 2015, the club announced a further one season stay at Whaddon Road but with increased rent to Cheltenham Town. This would mean the club would have been in exile for 9 seasons, 6 of them at Cheltenham. Confirmation that outline planning permission had been granted by the council came on the 22 September. The club now needs to be submit a full planning application before anything can be built.

==== Grays Athletic ====
Grays Athletic F.C. initially played at the Hoppit Ground in Little Thurrock. In 1906 they moved to the New Recreation Ground, playing there until 2010. After the ground was sold to developers, the club groundshared with East Thurrock United at their Rookery Hill ground in Corringham.

During the 2012–13 season the club played at Rush Green Stadium in Rush Green, sharing the ground with West Ham United's reserves who played in the Professional Development League. The following season, West Ham pulled out of the deal in June and Grays moved to Aveley's Mill Field ground. When Aveley moved to Parkside in 2017, Grays became tenants at the new ground.

==== Hamilton Academical ====
Hamilton Academical F.C. settled at Douglas Park in Hamilton, South Lanarkshire in 1888 and remained at the ground until 1994 when they sold it to a supermarket chain. The club played outside the town for several years, groundsharing at Cliftonhill (Coatbridge) and Firhill Stadium (northern Glasgow) for a number of years. A fans' campaign for the club to return to their home town was undertaken, including a single issue candidate at the 1999 Hamilton South by-election before a new ground, New Douglas Park, was built on a site adjacent to the previous ground. It opened in 2001.

==== Inverness Caledonian Thistle ====
Inverness Caledonian Thistle F.C. played at the Caledonian Stadium since 1996, following their move from Telford Street Park on the opposite side of Inverness at which they had played since their founding in 1994. In 2004, the club were temporarily relocated over 100 miles away to Pittodrie Stadium, Aberdeen, so that the Caledonian Stadium could be renovated to the 10,000 (later reduced to 6,000) seated capacity required to join the Scottish Premier League. The renovation was completed in a mere 47 days, and the club marked their return to Inverness with a 2–0 win over Dunfermline Athletic.

==== Newington F.C. ====
Newington F.C. originates in the Newington area of Belfast, although owing to the lack of facilities for junior and intermediate clubs in north Belfast they have played home matches at Muckamore Park in Antrim, at Brantwood FC on Skegoneill Avenue, Richardson Park in Dunmurry, and The Cliff in Larne. In 2008, the club became involved in a partnership with IFA Premiership club Crusaders, with a view to securing funding for a new, shared ground in north Belfast. As part of the arrangement, Newington used Crusaders’ ground Seaview for home matches in 2008–09, marking a return to home matches in the club's native north Belfast. From the 2013–14 season, the club's first season in NIFL Championship 2, until 2017–18, the club played at Seaview again. In 2018, the club moved to share Solitude with Cliftonville.

==== Northwich Victoria ====
Northwich Victoria F.C. from their foundation in 1874 played at the Drill Field, located in the centre of Northwich. Due to the ground not meeting new safety regulations and standards, and to provide revenue for the club, the ground was demolished in 2002. In the three-year gap between the demolition of the Drill Field and the construction of Victoria Stadium, Northwich played at Wincham Park, the home of their Northwich rivals Witton Albion, which is located across the canal from the Victoria Stadium. A new ground was built in Wincham, a few miles outside of the town in the middle of a business park. It was named the Victoria Stadium, and was opened in 2005, with its official opening in 2006 by Sir Alex Ferguson. In January 2012, chairman Jim Rushe's planned purchase of the Victoria Stadium fell through and the site was sold to chemical manufacturer Thor Specialities Ltd., who were based adjacent to the stadium and planned on expanding their operation. As a result, the club was evicted from the ground with immediate effect, with its remaining home fixtures of the 2011–12 season either played at nearby venues or switched to the ground of the away team. The club then tentatively agreed to share Marston Road, the home of Stafford Rangers located over 40 miles south of Northwich, to enable them to gain readmission to the Northern Premier League for the following season. The club hoped to secure a groundshare closer to their home town before the season started, and eventually agreed a lease on Flixton's Valley Road. However, the ground at Flixton did not meet ground grading requirements for the Northern Premier League. The club then unsuccessfully appealed the leagues refusal to allow the sub-standard ground at Flixton and followed this up with a second unsuccessful appeal as to their placement in the Southern division of the Northern Premier League. The club were forced to remain at Stafford, and were subsequently denied the appeal to switch to the Northern division due to the extra travelling for the away clubs. The club's relocation and sale of Drill Field were one of the factors in the creation of 1874 Northwich F.C., a breakaway club founded in 2012 by the supporters. However, they too do not play in Northwich, they currently share the Barton Stadium with nearby team Winsford United.

==== Slough Town ====
Slough Town F.C. currently play their home games at Holloways Park, Windsor Road, Beaconsfield.

For many years since the 1930s, Slough Town played at the Dolphin Stadium, just to the east of the town centre. From 1973 Slough Town played at the Wexham Park Stadium. At the end of the 2002–03 season, financial disagreements with the stadium's owners led to the club's eviction. The Stadium is still in existence, but has since fallen into a state of serious disrepair.

During the next four seasons (2003–04 to 2006–07) the club was based in Windsor, ground-sharing with Windsor & Eton at their Stag Meadow ground.

In the summer of 2007, the club agreed a three-year ground-share with Beaconsfield SYCOB. This was extended to cover the 2010–11 season, and, as of the 2012–13 season, is still continuing.

Since June 2009, Slough Town have been progressing a proposal submitted to Slough Borough Council for permission to build a new stadium within the Borough of Slough. The proposed location for the development is the Arbour Vale school site on Stoke Road, to the north of the town. In addition to a state-of-the-art stadium, the plans include affordable housing and sports fields. An artist's impression of the new ground was released in March 2012.

The stadium name will be Arbour Park, with up to 320 seats, meeting FA Regulations.

Preparations are still under way to submit a planning request. It was hoped that the Stadium would be ready by Autumn 2013, so that Slough Town could move back home for the 13/14 season. As of October 2012, a planning application had not been submitted, although Slough Borough Council announced its plan to place the Arbour Park development into the Slough Regeneration Partnership to assist the planning process.

==== South Shields F.C. (1974) ====
South Shields F.C. founded in 1974 as a phoenix club of two previous club of the same name (South Shields F.C. (1889) and South Shields F.C. (1936), see above) which both relocated to Gateshead, consider Filtrona Park, South Shields as their spiritual home. The ground has links with the nearby Filtrona factory which manufactures cigarette filters. As of the 2013–14 season, South Shields play at Eden Lane, Peterlee after being evicted from Filtrona Park. South Tyneside Council announced they hoped to have a new purpose built ground in the town in time for the 2014–15 season.

==== Tottenham Hotspur ====
Tottenham Hotspur late in 2014, was reported to be in negotiations with MK Dons over a temporary groundshare at Stadium:mk for a season, during renovations at Spurs' White Hart Lane ground. According to press reports, Tottenham proposed to play most home matches in Milton Keynes and a small number at Wembley Stadium. The idea of playing home matches in Milton Keynes, even temporarily, is largely unpopular with Spurs fans. The Tottenham Hotspur Supporters Trust stated in September 2014 that it would have "serious issues" with such an arrangement. In a London Evening Standard poll of 206 Tottenham fans two months later, 71 (34%) said they would attend home matches at Stadium mk if the club played there temporarily, while 135 (66%) said they would not.

Spurs' home ground from the 2018–19 season onward is Tottenham Hotspur Stadium, but the first few home games of the season were played at Wembley Stadium, in the London Borough of Brent, as were all games during 2017–2018. Their former home of White Hart Lane had been demolished at the end of the 2016–2017 season to make way for the new stadium on the same site.

Spurs eventually ended up playing a game at Stadium:mk against Watford in front of 23,650 people a fixture supported by former MK Dons player and Milton Keynes local Dele Alli.

==== Truro City ====
In 2011 Cornwall Council started developing a business plan for the proposed Stadium for Cornwall, which would host both Truro City and the Cornish Pirates rugby union team.

In 2014, the club sold Treyew Road for redevelopment, with the intention of using the money as their share of the development costs for the planned new stadium. The club received three extensions allowing them to stay at the ground following its sale, but in the summer of 2018, the development company announced its plans to begin work on the project immediately, forcing Truro City to find a temporary location. Eventually, the club came to an agreement with divisional rivals Torquay United to undertake a groundshare of their Plainmoor stadium, a ground that was 2 hours away from Truro. This agreement created the quirk of having more than 2,700 away fans than home ones in attendance when Truro hosted Torquay that season.

In January 2021 it was announced that the club will finally leave their Treyew Road ground and groundshare with Plymouth Parkway F.C. at Bolitho Park, Plymouth, until 2022 when the Stadium for Cornwall is scheduled to be finished.

==== Wooton Bassett Town ====
Wootton Bassett Town moved temporarily and currently play their home games at the Corinium Stadium, Cirencester, home of Cirencester Town. Their Reserve, Development and Ladies teams all play home fixtures at Royal Wootton Bassett Rugby Football Club's Ballards Ash ground, their traditional Royal Wootton Bassett home. The club will be moving all their teams to a new site opposite Ballards Ash in the summer of 2015.

==== Worcester City ====
Worcester City left their traditional home St George's Lane, Worcester in June 2013, as it has been sold to a housing developer. The sale of the ground was aimed at helping to fund the building of a new 6,000-capacity ground to be built at Nunnery Way on the edge of Worcester but the sale of the ground failed to provide sufficient finances to pay for such a stadium. Since 30 January 2013, they have ground-shared with Kidderminster Harriers at their Aggborough ground in Kidderminster from the 2013–14 season. In 2013 previous plans for the club's new stadium to be built out of the city at Nunnery Way were shelved, however thanks to the Worcester City Supporters' Trust a new full planning application has been submitted to the City of Worcester Council and is currently pending.

==== Worksop Town ====
In 1901 Worksop Town F.C. moved across the River Ryton to Central Avenue, staying there until 1988, when they were forced to move to play in Gainsborough. They returned to their home town in 1992 when a new ground was built on Sandy Lane. They lost ownership of Sandy Lane in 2005 and again had to groundshare elsewhere before returning to Sandy Lane in 2011, this time as tenants of Worksop Parramore.

=== Failed relocation proposals ===
==== Barnet F.C. ====
Pete Winkelman attempted to negotiate a move with two League clubs from London over to Milton Keynes; he approached Crystal Palace and Barnet, but neither were interested. Winkelman then offered the ground to Wimbledon. Barnet did eventually move from their ground in Barnet, to The Hive Stadium in the neighbouring borough of Harrow.

==== Charlton Athletic ====
The south-east London club Charlton Athletic were linked with a move to "a progressive Midlands borough" in 1973, a year after Charlton's relegation to the third tier. The Gliksten family, which owned Charlton from 1932 to 1982 and had a history of proposing elaborate schemes for the club, (Note: On buying the team in 1932, they briefly planned to expand The Valley to house 200,000 fans, which would have been a world record capacity. Jimmy Seed, Charlton's manager from 1933 to 1956, claimed in his autobiography that the Glikstens later considered moving the club to South Africa to avoid taxes.) revealed plans to build a community sports complex at The Valley, and to hold a public market at the ground on weekdays. Greenwich Council refused to license the market and insisted that the complex be built on public space at a local park. The club reacted by announcing the proposed move to the Midlands. Fans inundated the local media and club offices with strong opinion against a move, prompting Charlton to print a statement in the 14 April 1973 match programme telling fans that the proposed move was because of the council's attitude regarding the market and complex plans, which the team said threatened its future. "You, the supporters, can make sure the club continues in Charlton by protesting as loud as you can to Greenwich Council over their refusal to grant us permission for our plans", the message explained. No relocation occurred.

==== Crystal Palace F.C. ====
Pete Winkelman attempted to negotiate a move to Milton Keynes with two League clubs from London; he approached Crystal Palace and Barnet, but neither were interested. Winkelman then offered the ground to Wimbledon.

==== Farnborough Town F.C. & Kingstonian F.C. → Kingston & Farnborough United ====
In 1999, Graham Westley bought a controlling interest in Farnborough Town, making himself shortly afterwards the manager of the first team. He changed the club's colours from its traditional yellow and blue to red and white and the name of the club's home ground, Cherrywood Road, to The Aimita Stadium; these moves were met with opposition from the fans. At the start of 2002 he proposed a merger between Farnborough and the club that he had previously played for and managed, Kingstonian F.C., where during his tenure he suggested changing the club's name to “Kingston Town” and its traditional strip of red and white hoops to all red. Wesley's justification for the merger was that the model of Rushden & Diamonds could be replicated (they went bust in 2011), and said "imagine if Manchester hadn’t United all those years ago", despite the fact that Manchester United had not changed their name as the result of a merger, and suggested Kingston upon Thames and Farnborough were "in closely located, growing towns" and in "the same conurbation", despite the fact that almost thirty miles separated them and the clubs nor the towns had no previous links. The merger was met with significant opposition from both sets of businesses involved with the two clubs and both sets of fans the idea was quickly dismissed.

==== North Ferriby United → East Hull ====
In October 2018, the owner of North Ferriby United, Carl Chadwick, submitted a name change application with the Football Association in October 2018 which could see the team become "East Hull" the following season, as well as considering a relocation to Dunswell Park on the northern edge of Hull.

==== Leyton Orient ====
On 18 October 2011, Leyton Orient F.C. submitted a request to the Football League to become tenants of the London 2012 Olympic Stadium after the initial decision (to award the stadium to West Ham United) had collapsed on 11 October 2011, following legal challenges from Tottenham Hotspur and Leyton. Leyton also expressed an interest in ground sharing the stadium with West Ham, but West Ham were not keen on the idea, and in December 2012 West Ham was chosen as the permanent tenant of the Olympic Stadium. Orient chairman Barry Hearn voiced his complaints over West Ham being given an anchor tenancy at the stadium. Orient claimed that the stadium was too close to their own, which they claimed would breach FA rules, and by extension, move the club into bankruptcy. On 6 March, Barry Hearn stated that he would mount another legal challenge as he believed that the rules set out by the LLDC had not been followed. Hearn also said that he felt that Leyton Orient's proposed ground share had been ignored and not properly explored. Leyton's legal challenge was ended when a confidential agreement between Orient and the Premier League was reached.

==== Luton Town → MK Hatters ====
Luton Town, based 20 miles (32 km) from Milton Keynes in Luton and nicknamed "the Hatters", were seeking a new site in the early 1980s. As early as 1960, then-First Division Luton's attendances had been deemed far too low for the top flight by Charles Buchan's Football Monthly, which also considered their ground at Kenilworth Road, in the middle of town, to be hard to get to. At this time the club was already planning a 50,000-capacity ground near Dunstable, to the north-west of Luton, but no new ground materialised. Luton were relegated in 1960 and, apart from the 1974–75 season, remained outside of the top division until 1982–83.

With the team still based at the "cramped and inadequate" Kenilworth Road in 1983, the construction of a new road next to the ground escalated the need for a replacement. The Milton Keynes Development Corporation approached Luton proposing a new all-seater stadium in central Milton Keynes, housing either 18,000 or 20,000 spectators, as part of a leisure and retail development. Luton's owners were receptive to the idea; according to The Luton News, the relocated "MK Hatters" would play home matches in a "super-stadium". This ground would reportedly have an artificial pitch and a roof; Milton Keynes Council would invest heavily in its construction. The Luton chairman Denis Mortimer surmised if the team moved it would not only garner new fans from the Milton Keynes area but also retain the existing Luton fanbase. He said that the club was financially unsustainable at Kenilworth Road and would go bankrupt if it did not move.

The Milton Keynes idea was very poorly received by Luton fans and viewed, in Bale's words, as "tearing the club from its most loyal supporters". Luton fans held protest marches and rallies throughout the 1983–84 season, and chartered a plane to fly over Kenilworth Road during one match pulling a banner reading "Keep Luton Town F.C. in Luton". Some 18,000 Luton residents signed a petition against the club leaving. A consortium of local businessmen attempted to persuade Vauxhall Motors, General Motors' Luton-based British marque, to invest in the club and help with a new stadium in Luton. In Milton Keynes, some residents expressed fears that Luton's arrival in central Milton Keynes might bring with it football hooliganism and threaten local amenities. Some Luton supporters boycotted the club's first home match of the 1984–85 season in protest against the Milton Keynes plans. The wide unpopularity of the proposed move and the consistently vehement opposition from Luton's local support combined to prevent it from occurring. "The directors want our support and our money", said Tom Hunt, a member of a Luton fans' action group against the move, "but they ignore the views of a community that wants to keep its football club. Why should fans pay at the turnstiles to help the club in business so that it can be taken away from us?"

==== Oxford United & Reading F.C. → Thames Valley Royals ====
Shortly before the end of the 1982–83 Football League season, Robert Maxwell, the then-owner and chairman of Oxford United Football Club, announced that he had made a deal with the owners of nearby Reading to amalgamate the two teams to create a new club he proposed to name "Thames Valley Royals". This appellation combined a loose term for the geographical region, "Thames Valley", with the Reading team's nickname, "the Royals". With each team having financial problems, Maxwell claimed that both were on the verge of going out of business and that uniting them was necessary for the region to retain a Football League club.

Maxwell envisioned Thames Valley Royals' future home as an unspecified location somewhere between Oxford and Reading where a new stadium would be built, perhaps Didcot; home matches would alternate between Oxford and Reading in the meantime. Both sets of supporters promptly embarked on mass demonstrations against the merger, including protest marches and a 2,000-man sit-in on the pitch at Oxford before a match on 23 April. Maxwell pressed on with his plan regardless, insisting that "nothing short of the end of the Earth" would prevent its fruition.

The proposed amalgamation was stopped by the actions of one of Reading's board directors, Roy Tranter, and Roger Smee, a businessman and former Reading player. Smee disputed the legitimacy of the controlling interest in Reading held by the faction of three Reading board members that backed the merger plan, including the chairman Frank Waller, and Tranter launched a legal challenge to the sale of certain shares on 22 April 1983. Waller and his boardroom allies resigned under pressure from the rest of the Reading board on 12 May 1983, and at an extraordinary shareholders' meeting in July, Smee took over the club, ending the amalgamation plans.

==== Queens Park Rangers ====
Towards the end of the 2000–01 season Wimbledon and Queens Park Rangers, who were in financial administration, entered discussions over a merger; the new team would play at Loftus Road. The Football League announced on 2 May 2001 that it would give "favourable consideration" to a takeover of QPR by Wimbledon, but that the process would have to be very quick for the merged team to take part in the 2001–02 season. Noades said that Wimbledon would have to give him 12 months' notice to leave Selhurst Park. The majority of Wimbledon and QPR fans quickly made their opposition to a merger known. Following Wimbledon's draw with Norwich City at Selhurst Park on 6 May, Koppel came onto the pitch and told the mostly jeering home fans that "there never was a merger proposal with QPR"; the Loftus Road club had instigated the talks, he said. QPR abandoned the amalgamation plan two days later, citing potential fan alienation.

A month later, Winkelman offered his Milton Keynes stadium site to QPR, promising that the club's name and blue-and-white hooped strip would be kept in Buckinghamshire and that the fans would be represented on the board of directors. "We have real resources to put behind the club", said Winkelman. "They are fast running out of solutions and we are the answer to their problems." QPR dismissed the offer, leading the developers to once again contact Wimbledon later that month.

==== Wimbledon F.C. ====
The south-west London club Wimbledon, traditionally a semi-professional non-League side, through successive promotions caused the team to reach a level of prominence far above that suggested by its modest home stadium at Plough Lane, which remained largely unchanged from the club's non-League days. Wimbledon's record attendance at Plough Lane—18,000, set "in the 1930s against a team of sailors from HMS Victory"—was never broken during 14 League seasons at the ground, including five in the top flight.

Ron Noades, who purchased the club for £2,782 in 1976, came to see Plough Lane as a potential limitation by 1979. He surmised that it could only attract a relatively small number of fans because of its location, close to large areas of sparsely populated parkland. Noades's interest was piqued by the site the Milton Keynes Development Corporation had earmarked for a stadium next to the town's still-under-construction Central railway station. "They were very keen to get a Football League club, effectively a franchise if you like, into Milton Keynes to take up that site", Noades said in a 2001 interview. Planning to move Wimbledon there by amalgamating with an established Milton Keynes club, Noades purchased debt-ridden Southern League club Milton Keynes City (MK City; formerly Bletchley Town) (Note: The name "Milton Keynes City" (MK City) refers to two different non-League clubs. The first was founded as Bletchley Town F.C., and was called MK City from 1974 until its liquidation in 1985. The second was founded as Mercedes-Benz F.C., and played as MK City from 1998 until its demise in 2003.) for £1. He and three other Wimbledon directors—Jimmy Rose, Bernie Coleman and Sam Hammam—were promptly voted onto MK City's board "in an advisory capacity". This was a separate personal investment by the four directors, Noades said at the time, and not relevant to a move, though he also spoke at length about the superior long-term promise of the Milton Keynes location.

Despite his early optimism, Noades soon came to the conclusion that a League club in Milton Keynes would not draw crowds much higher than those Wimbledon already attracted in south London. "I couldn't really see us getting any bigger gates than what Northampton Town were currently getting at that time, and, in fact, are still getting", he recalled in 2001. "I really couldn't see any future in it. I can't actually see that there is a means of drawing large attendances to Milton Keynes." Abandoning his interest in MK City, Noades sold Wimbledon to Hammam in 1981. Later that year Noades bought nearby Crystal Palace and briefly explored merging that club with Wimbledon.

In 1994, Wimbledon's Irish-born manager Joe Kinnear contacted Eamon Dunphy, a football pundit and former player from Ireland, to inform him of this and to put to him the idea of moving the club to Dublin. Dunphy was enthusiastic about the idea and became its main proponent in Ireland over the next three years. It was suggested that Wimbledon fans from London could be given free flights to Dublin for home matches, and that British Sky Broadcasting might pay to fly the opposing teams there during the first season.

Opinion polls in the Republic showed consistently high support for the idea of Wimbledon hosting Premier League matches in Dublin, but the League of Ireland argued that this would endanger its existence, and in September 1996 about 300 fans rallied in Dublin under the slogan "Resist the Dublin Dons". Twenty Irish clubs "reaffirmed their opposition" to Wimbledon playing in Dublin the following month; a week later Reuters called the proposal "dead and buried". When Hammam requested talks with the Football Association of Ireland (FAI) top brass in April 1997, they refused to even meet him. Vocal opposition from Wimbledon fans emerged—after a friendly match in August 1997 fans holding "Dublin = Death" and "Dons Belong In Merton" placards refused to leave the stadium for two hours. Soon afterwards, Hammam met six leading protesters, who told him that in the event of a move they would start a new non-League club locally.

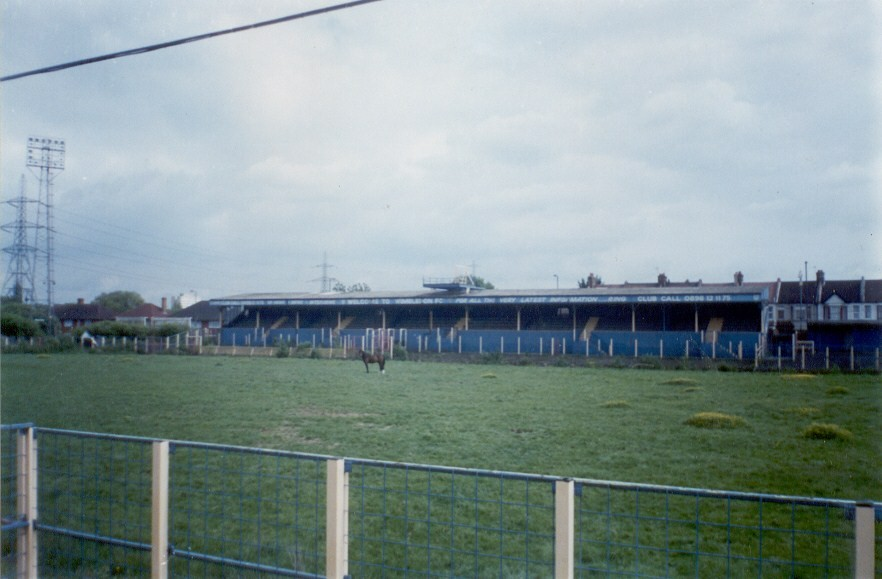
Plough Lane in 2000, standing derelict

Playing away from Merton at a supposedly temporary home, Wimbledon set a record for the lowest-ever English top-flight attendance during the 1992–93 season, drawing only 3,039 fans to a Tuesday-night match against Everton on 26 January 1993. However the general trend was one of a sharp rise—the club's average home attendance more than doubled at Selhurst Park from around 8,000 during the last years at Plough Lane to a peak of over 18,000 during the 1998–99 Premier League season. Hammam sold Wimbledon to two Norwegian businessmen, Kjell Inge Røkke and Bjørn Rune Gjelsten, for a reported £26 million in June 1997, while remaining at the club in an advisory role. In December that year, Wimbledon were reported to be considering the football and greyhounds option again. Ownership of Plough Lane was transferred from the club to Rudgwick Limited—a company founded in 1993 with Hammam serving as director. With political control of Merton Council having changed, Hammam secured the £8 million sale of Plough Lane to Safeway supermarkets in 1998. He unsuccessfully attempted to gain permission to redevelop a former gas works in Merton during the same year, and soon after entered abortive negotiations over a site in Beddington.

Frustrated by the lack of progress, Hammam shifted his focus to Dublin and other locations outside London—Basingstoke, Gatwick, Belfast, Cardiff and Scotland. He later claimed that during this time seven clubs from outside London approached Wimbledon with groundshare offers. (Note: The clubs Hammam named were Birmingham City, Brighton & Hove Albion, Hull City, Luton Town, Portsmouth, Watford and West Bromwich Albion.) By February 1998, Clydebank of the Scottish third tier were also pursuing a move to the Irish capital. Swayed by Hammam's offer of £500,000 to each League of Ireland club, the same amount to the FAI and "schools of excellence all over the country" in return for support, five Irish teams now backed Wimbledon's Dublin proposal. Later that year, after the Premier League had approved the idea, the lengthy, heated debate in Ireland ended with an FAI veto. With Dublin now not an option, Hammam attempted to buy Selhurst Park from Noades, who had sold Crystal Palace in 1998, but still owned the ground. This led nowhere. Hammam finally sold his shares in Wimbledon in February 2000, and seven months later became the owner of Cardiff City. Wimbledon were relegated from the Premier League at the end of the 1999–2000 season. The average attendance at Wimbledon home matches dropped by more than half over the next year, from 17,157 during the 1999–2000 season to 7,897 during 2000–01.

== Association Football (women's) ==
=== Relocations of teams which assumed new identities ===
==== Bristol City W.F.C. → Team Bath W.F.C. ====
Bristol City W.F.C. moved to Bath and became Team Bath W.F.C., part of the TeamBath group of sports teams, after in May 2007 Bristol City announced that they would no longer fund a women's team.

==== Bromley Borough → Croydon W.F.C. → Charlton Athletic W.F.C. ====
The team was formed in 1991 as Bromley Borough by disaffected members of Millwall Lionesses' WFA Cup winning squad. the club won promotion into the National Premier League in 1994. The club entered the top-flight however as Croydon W.F.C., having tied up with Croydon F.C. and relocating to Croydon. At Croydon W.F.C.'s AGM in June 2000, the club's players controversially voted to accept a hostile takeover from Charlton Athletic. Bampton resigned as manager, as both the club's committee and the FA declared affiliation with the men's Premier League club to be against the rules. The Croydon F.C. chairman, Ken Jarvie, also attempted to block the move which was eventually sanctioned. Charlton Athletic W.F.C. currently play at Bayliss Avenue, Thamesmead, groundsharing with Thamesmead Town.

==== Coventry City Ladies → Coventry United L.F.C. → Coventry United W.F.C. → Rugby Borough W.F.C. ====
Originally founded in 2013 as Coventry City Ladies, the club initially played at Coventry University Sports and Conference Centre, Westwood Heath and at Coventry Sphinx FC, before moving to the Oval, Bedworth. In August 2014 the club announced a move to the Ricoh Arena in Coventry for the 2014–15 season. Midway through the 2014–15 season, Coventry Ladies were forced out of the Ricoh Arena after the arrival of Wasps RFC to the Ricoh. They found themselves playing at the Bedworth Oval once again.

The club merged with non-League football club Coventry United F.C. to form Coventry United Ladies Football Club in 2015, and moved into the Butts Park Arena, home of Coventry R.F.C. where Coventry United play.

In 2021 Steve Quinlan, Paul Marsh and Darren Langdon bought a 49% stake in the club. The club announced plans to turn professional and are beginning their first season as a fully professional club in 2021/22. The club announced plans to liquidate on 23 December 2021 however the club never entered into liquidation. With a formal deadline set for 4 January 2022, investors Angels Group, headed up by CEO Lewis Taylor, made a bid to acquire the club and clear the debts to ensure the club could complete the season. The offer was accepted and the club was rescued although the FA handed down a 10 points deduction for triggering an insolvency event although the club did not officially enter liquidation. Coventry United Women appealed the decision on various grounds, however the appeal was unsuccessful. With few games to play in the Women's Championship, the points deduction was the equivalent of a 21 points deduction in the Men's Champions due to the available points difference.

Prior to the 2022–23 season, the club was renamed Coventry United Women Football Club. In June 2023, following the club's relegation from the Women's Championship, the second tier of women's domestic football in England, Coventry United F.C.'s association with the women's team was terminated and the club relocated from Coventry to Rugby and was given its present name, Rugby Borough W.F.C., affiliating with Rugby Borough F.C.

==== District Line Ladies → Wembley Ladies → Barnet Ladies ====
District Line Ladies F.C. founded in 1975 relocated to Vale Farm, Wembley, after being tied up with Wembley F.C. in 1993 to become Wembley Ladies F.C. In 1997 the club moved to play at Reynolds Field in Perivale, home of Hanwell Town, but kept the Wembley Ladies name. Then in 1998 the club became affiliated to Barnet F.C., amalgamating with the existing Barnet Ladies F.C. from the Greater London League to form Barnet F.C. Ladies. In 2013, they were successful in their bid to join the WSL under their new name of London Bees for the 2014 season

==== Lincoln City Ladies → Notts County Ladies ====
Notts County Ladies F.C. were created in 2014 when Lincoln Ladies were controversially relocated from Lincoln to Nottingham and re-branded. The club were originally formed in Lincoln in 1995 and also spent a period known as Lincoln City Ladies while affiliated to Lincoln City. Sincil Bank and other smaller venues staged the club's matches during their time in Lincoln. The club was named OOH Lincoln Ladies from 2008 until 2010, due to sponsorship from Ray Trew's OOH Media PLC.

The club withdrew from the FA WSL 1, the top tier in the English women's football league system, two days before the start of the FA WSL Spring Series on 21 April 2017.

==== Oldham Athletic Ladies → Oldham Curzon Ladies ====
The club was founded in 1988 as Oldham Athletic L.F.C., affiliated to Oldham Athletic, and began playing in 1990. Several promotions were won over the following seasons and the club set up youth squads. In 1998 they moved to Ashton-under-Lyne and changed their name to Oldham Curzon L.F.C. In 2005 the club name changed to Curzon Ashton L.F.C. and the club is now affiliated to Curzon Ashton F.C.

==== Preston North End W.F.C. → Fylde Ladies ====
Preston North End W.F.C. used to play in Preston when the club was affiliated with Preston North End. This was until 2016 where they moved to Fylde to Kellamergh Park in the village of Warton, becoming Fylde Ladies F.C. In August 2018 they moved in with their male counterpart team to Mill Farm in Wesham, training at the Fylde Sports and Education Centre.

=== Relocations of teams without change in name or identity ===
==== Birmingham City L.F.C. ====
Birmingham City L.F.C. in 2005 left Redditch United's The Valley Stadium in Redditch, for Stratford Town's DCS Stadium at Knights Lane, in Tiddington, Warwickshire. The club underwent another stadium change in 2014, leaving the DCS Stadium for Solihull Moors' Damson Park.

==== Celtic L.F.C. ====
Celtic L.F.C. moved from their base the club's traditional training ground Lennoxtown training centre in Lennoxtown, East Dunbartonshire to the K-Park Training Academy in East Kilbride, South Lanarkshire, which is shared with the men's senior team East Kilbride F.C. from the 2015 season onwards.

==== Chelsea L.F.C. ====
Chelsea L.F.C., who are based in Fulham, until 2017 played their home games at Wheatsheaf Park, the home of the Staines Town F.C. The stadium is located in Staines-upon-Thames, Middlesex and features capacity for 3,002 spectators.

The team played at Imperial Fields during the 2011–12 season, the home ground of Isthmian League club Tooting & Mitcham United.

As of the 2017–18 season, Chelsea L.F.C. plays at Kingsmeadow in Norbiton, Kingston upon Thames, London, which the Chelsea organisation has agreed to purchase from current occupant AFC Wimbledon in order for them to finance a new stadium for their own use (ultimately New Plough Lane). Kingsmeadow has a capacity of 4,850 (2,265 of which is seated).

==== Liverpool L.F.C. ====
Liverpool L.F.C. announced a move from the West Lancashire College Stadium in Skelmersdale, to the Halton Stadium in Widnes for 2013.

==== Portsmouth F.C. Ladies ====
Portsmouth F.C. Ladies have played in a number of different stadiums throughout their history. Currently, Portsmouth the majority of their home games at Privett Park, Gosport, the home of National League South side Gosport Borough F.C. Prior to this, Pompey played at the Moneyfields Sports Ground, Portsmouth, the home ground of Wessex League Premier Division side Moneyfields F.C. The team have also in recent seasons played at The City Ground, Winchester, home of Southern League Division One South & West side Winchester City.

In the Fourth Round of the 2012/13 FA Cup, Portsmouth played their home tie against QPR at West Leigh Park, Havant. Subsequently, this stadium was announced as the home venue for the rest of the season, although the last two home games were played at the College Ground, Hayling Island, home of Hayling United FC, as a result of the overrunning of the season due to bad weather and the pitch at Westleigh Park being relaid. Westleigh Park continued to be used as Pompey Ladies' main home ground for the first half of the following season, however poor weather over the New Year period saw Pompey Ladies relocate, with the Blues playing most of the second half of the season at Privett Park, where as of 2016, they still play.

==== Tottenham Hotspur L.F.C. ====
Tottenham Hotspur Ladies F.C. moved home grounds to Cheshunt Stadium, Cheshunt, home of Cheshunt F.C. in 2016, moving from Barrows Farm stadium.

== See also ==
- Stadium relocations in Scottish football

== Bibliography ==
- Bale, John (1993). Sport, Space and the City. London: Routledge. ISBN 0-415-08098-3.
- Bendixson, Terence; Platt, John (1992). Milton Keynes: Image and Reality. Cambridge: Granta Editions. ISBN 0-906782-72-4.
- Cox, Richard; Russell, Dave; Vamplew, Wray, eds. (September 2002). Encyclopedia of British Football. London: Routledge. ISBN 978-0-7146-5249-8.
- Crabtree, Stephen (April 1996). The Dons in the League 1977–1982. Buckingham: Sporting and Leisure Press. ISBN 0-86023-558-0.
- Hammam, Sam (2000-01-14). The Wimbledon We Have. London: Wimbledon F.C.
- Parker, Raj; Stride, Steve; Turvey, Alan (2002-05-28). Report of the Independent Commission on Wimbledon F.C.'s wish to relocate to Milton Keynes (PDF). The Football Association. Archived from the original (PDF) on 2012-02-05.
- Inglis, Simon (1996) [1985]. Football Grounds of Britain (3rd ed.). London: CollinsWillow. ISBN 0-00-218426-5.
- Ward, Andrew; Williams, John (2010) [2009]. Football Nation: Sixty Years of the Beautiful Game. London: Bloomsbury Publishing. ISBN 978-1-4088-0126-0.
