= American Society of Cataract and Refractive Surgery =

Health organization in the United States

The American Society of Cataract and Refractive Surgery (ASCRS), a professional society for surgeons specializing in eye surgery. It is based in Fairfax, VA and was founded in 1974. It is distinct from its sister organization, the American Society of Ophthalmic Administrators (ASOA), which concerns itself with the business management, including insurance reimbursement and marketing, of ophthalmic practices in the United States. Both associations hold annual meetings or conventions as well as publishing proceedings.

ASCRS publishes a monthly Journal of Cataract & Refractive Surgery (JCRS), as a joint production with the European Society of Cataract and Refractive Surgeons (ESCRS).

== Awards ==
Since 1975, the ASCRS annually awards the Binkhorst medal to doctors who have made significant contributions to the science and practice of ophthalmology, which includes a stipend to give the Binkhorst lecture.

=== Ophthalmology Hall of Fame ===
Since 1999, the ASCRS has hosted the Ophthalmology Hall of Fame to which it periodically elects pioneers of ophthalmology as well as those who have significantly inspired, supported and led the development of ophthalmology.

==== 1999 ====
- José I. Barraquer (1916–1998)
- Ramón Castroviejo (1904–1987)
- Stewart Duke-Elder (1899–1978)
- J. Donald M. Gass (1928–2005)
- Charles D. Kelman (1930–2004)
- A. Edward Maumenee (1913–1998)
- Marshall M. Parks (1918–2005)
- Harold Ridley (1907–2001)
- Charles L. Schepens (1912–2006)
- Lorenz E. Zimmerman (1920–2013)

==== 2000 ====
- Ernst Fuchs (1851–1930)
- Hans Goldmann (1899–1991)
- Albrecht von Graefe (1828–1870)
- Robert Machemer (1933–2009)
- Frank B. Walsh (1895–1978)

==== 2001 ====
- Cornelius D. Binkhorst (1912–1995)
- David G. Cogan (1908–1993)
- Svyatoslav N. Fyodorov (1927–2000)
- Hermann von Helmholtz (1821–1894)
- Gerd Meyer-Schwickerath (1920–1992)

==== 2002 ====
- Bernard Becker (1920–2013)
- Jules Gonin (1870–1935)
- Edward W. D. Norton (1922–1994)
- Arnall Patz (1920–2010)

==== 2003 ====
- Danièle S. Aron-Rosa (born 1934)
- Joaquin Barraquer (1927–2016)
- Paul A. Chandler (1897–1987)
- William F. Hoyt (born 1926)
- Norman S. Jaffe (born 1924)
- Jules C. Stein (1896–1981)

==== 2004 ====
- Claes H. Dohlman (born 1922)
- Jonas S. Friedenwald, (1897–1955)
- Govindappa Venkataswamy (1918–2006)

==== 2005 ====
- Jules François (1907–1984)
- Gholam A. Peyman
- Robert M. Sinskey

==== 2006 ====
- Algernon B. Reese (1896–1981)

==== 2007 ====
- Ida Caroline Mann (1893–1983)

==== 2009 ====
- Endre Alexander Balazs
- Jacques Daviel

==== 2010 ====
- Alan C. Bird
- Judah Folkman

==== 2017 ====
- Gullapalli Nageswara Rao

== See also ==
- American Academy of Optometry
