= Hermenegildo Arruga =

Hermenegildo Arruga Liró, 1st Count of Arruga (March 15, 1886 – May 17, 1972) was a Spanish ophthalmologist known for refining several eye surgeries. He devised one of the early procedures to address retinal detachment, and he received the Gonin Medal from the International Council of Ophthalmology in 1950.

== Biography ==
Arruga was the second of three generations of eye surgeons. He and his father, ophthalmologist Eduardo Arruga, were both born in Barcelona. He entered medical studies at 16 and graduated in 1908, leaving Spain for a while for further study in France and Germany. His mentors included Edmund Landolt, Julius Hirschberg and Félix de Lapersonne. He returned to Barcelona, spending the rest of his life seeing patients there, with the exception of a move to South America during the Spanish Civil War. Arruga lived above his clinic in Barcelona, where patients and physicians from all over the world came to see him.

One of the first surgeons to promote intracapsular cataract extraction, Arruga also suggested technical improvements to several other eye surgeries. Arruga introduced a procedure for treating retinal detachment that became known as Arruga's suture. In this surgery, a band was made around the sclera using Supramid, a synthetic suture material, but the technique caused some problems with scleral erosion. Even after the procedure could be performed with silicone bands, there were still problems with ischemia of the anterior segment of the eye, and the procedure was ultimately replaced by newer techniques.

Arruga was close friends with Jules Gonin, the Swiss ophthalmologist who devised the first retinal detachment repair surgery. Arruga wrote two influential books: Retinal Detachment (1936) and Ocular Surgery (1946); for the latter, his son, ophthalmologist Alfredo Arruga-Forgas, wrote a chapter of the third English edition (1962).

In 1950, Arruga won the Gonin Medal. He was recognized with the Order of Isabella the Catholic in 1956. He received honorary doctorates from the University of Barcelona and Heidelberg University. Arruga was named an honorary fellow of the Royal College of Surgeons of Edinburgh. He was created Count of Arruga (Spanish: Conde de Arruga), in 18 July 1950.

Arruga enjoyed chess and was a skilled artist. He engaged in mountain climbing, reaching the summit of the Jungfrau in the Bernese Alps when he was 70 years old.

He died of heart disease in 1972. He was preceded in death by his wife, Teresa Forgas, the mother of his four children; she died following an automobile accident.
