= V. S. Sangwan =

Indian ophthalmologist

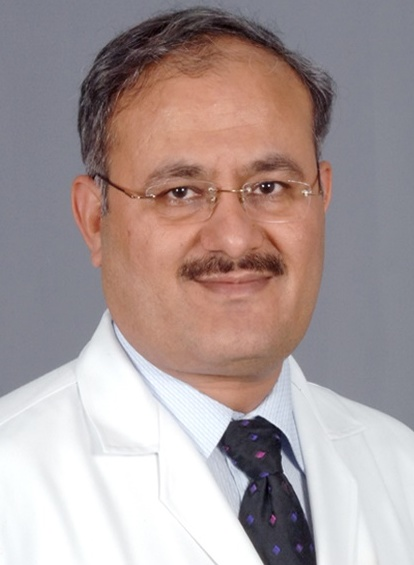
- Born: 22 August 1964 (age 62); Haryana, India
- Education: Maharshi Dayanand University; L. V. Prasad Eye Institute; Massachusetts Eye and Ear
- Known for: Studies on limbal stem cell biology
- Awards: 2002 Dr. P. Siva Reddy Researcher of the Year Award; 2003 Dr. Vengal Rao Award; 2005 Col. Rangachary Award; 2006 Shanti Swarup Bhatnagar Prize; 2007 DBT National Technology Award; AAO Achievement Award
- Scientific career
- Fields: Ophthalmology
- Workplaces: Orbis International; L. V. Prasad Eye Institute

Virender Singh Sangwan (born 22 August 1964) is an Indian ophthalmologist and the Dr. Paul Dubord Chair professor and director of the L. V. Prasad Eye Institute, Hyderabad. Known for his research on limbal stem cells, Sangwan is the founder secretary and an adviser of the Uveitis Society of India. The Council of Scientific and Industrial Research, the apex agency of the Government of India for scientific research, awarded him the Shanti Swarup Bhatnagar Prize for Science and Technology, one of the highest Indian science awards for his contributions to Medical Sciences in 2006. (Note: Long link – please select award year to see details)

== Biography ==
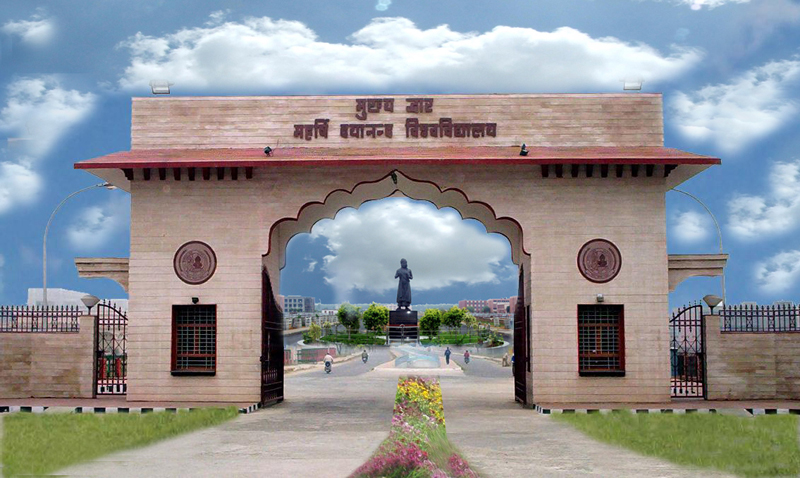
Entrance to Maharshi Dayanand University

Born in the north Indian state of Haryana, Virender S. Sangwan graduated in medicine from Maharshi Dayanand University in 1986 and completed his MS in ophthalmology in 1991. Subsequently, he did a fellowship at L. V. Prasad Eye Institute (LVPEI) on cornea and anterior segment surgery and during his stay there, Gullapalli Nageswara Rao, the founder of the institute, advised him about the opportunity to join Orbis International as an acting medical director at Orbis Flying Eye Hospital which he accepted. He held the position for over 18 months and left for another fellowship program on ocular immunology and uveitis at Massachusetts Eye and Ear, an associate of Harvard Medical School under the supervision of Charles Stephen Foster, who would later found the Massachusetts Eye Research and Surgery Institution. Returning to India, he re-joined LVPEI as a cornea specialist, became an associate director and a director and heads SRUJANA Centre for Innovation as well as the Center for Ocular Regeneration, a joint venture of LVPEI and Massachusetts Institute of Technology. He holds the Dr.Paul Dubord Chair in Cornea at LVPEI and is as an adjunct associate professor at University of Rochester.

Virender Sangwan is married to Vandana who is a dental surgeon and the couple has two children, Sonalika and Sahil.

== Legacy ==
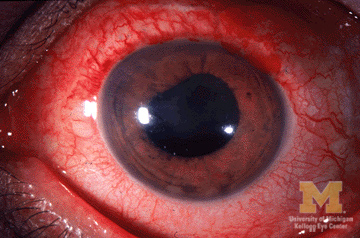
Anterior uveitis

Sangwan has done extensive work on limbal stem cells which is reported to have assisted in restoring vision to patients with corneal injuries. Along with Geeta K. Vemuganti, an ophthalmologist with interest in limbal stem cell studies, he carried out research on the subject and together they developed a methodology for growing stem cells for subsequent transplantation in human eyes for repairing injured epithelium and cornea. This was subsequently put on clinical trial in 2011, reported to be the largest successful trial of stem cell therapy on humans, till then. Later, with the assistance of two philanthropists, they established Sudhakar and Sreekanth Ravi Stem Cell Biology Laboratory where he furthered his work. The methodology developed by him involved harvesting of cell tissues from the healthy eye of the patient and cultivation of the cell tissues on amniotic sac membrane which was then transplanted on the injured eye; he has done over 800 transplants at LVPEI, reportedly with 76% success rate. Later, he also developed a methodology for culturing conjunctival and limbal stem cells together which is known to have application in treating patients with extreme ocular damage of the outer surface. His studies have been documented by way of a number of articles (Note: Please see Selected bibliography section) of which many have been listed by online article repositories such as Google Scholar and ResearchGate, and his work has drawn citations in texts by others. He has also served as an investigator in a number of clinical projects undertaken by Sudhakar and Sreekanth Ravi Stem Cell Biology Laboratory.

Sangwan, having undergone two years' of training at Foster's laboratory on ocular immunology, had started his Indian career focusing on ocular inflammatory diseases such as Uveitis and his early work was in this field was as an uveitis and retina specialist at LVPEI. This gave him the opportunity to interact with the pioneers of uveitis treatment in India such as Narsing A. Rao, Amod Gupta, Rajeeve Buddi, Jyotirmay Biswas and S. R. Rathinam and when Rao inspired the others to form the Uveitis Society of India in 1999, he was among the founder members, serving as its founder secretary and treasurer, where he is a member of the advisory board of the society. He is involved with the Himalayan Vision Project, a joint venture between LV Prasad Eye Institute and Himalayan Health Project and has been associated with journals, including Indian Journal of Ophthalmology, Comprehensive Ophthalmology Update, Clinical & Experimental Ophthalmology, International Ophthalmology and British Journal of Ophthalmology. A vice president of the Asia Cornea Society, he is an honorary member of North African Centre for Sight and Visual Sciences as well as the national societies of ophthalmology of Peru and El Salvador. He sat in the international steering committees of Lux Uveitis Multicenter Investigation of a New Approach to Treatment (LUMINATE) trial and LUCIDA Program for Prevention of Corneal Transplant Rejection of Lux Biosciences and is a former secretary of Eye Bank Association of India. The invited speeches or keynote addresses delivered by him include a lecture on Cell-based Therapy for Ocular Reconstruction at the Louis J. Fox Center for Vision Restoration of University of Pittsburgh Medical Center in October 2010. and the TEDx talk titled, Square Peg in Round Hole at National Institute of Technology Calicut on 14 January 2012.

== Awards and honors ==
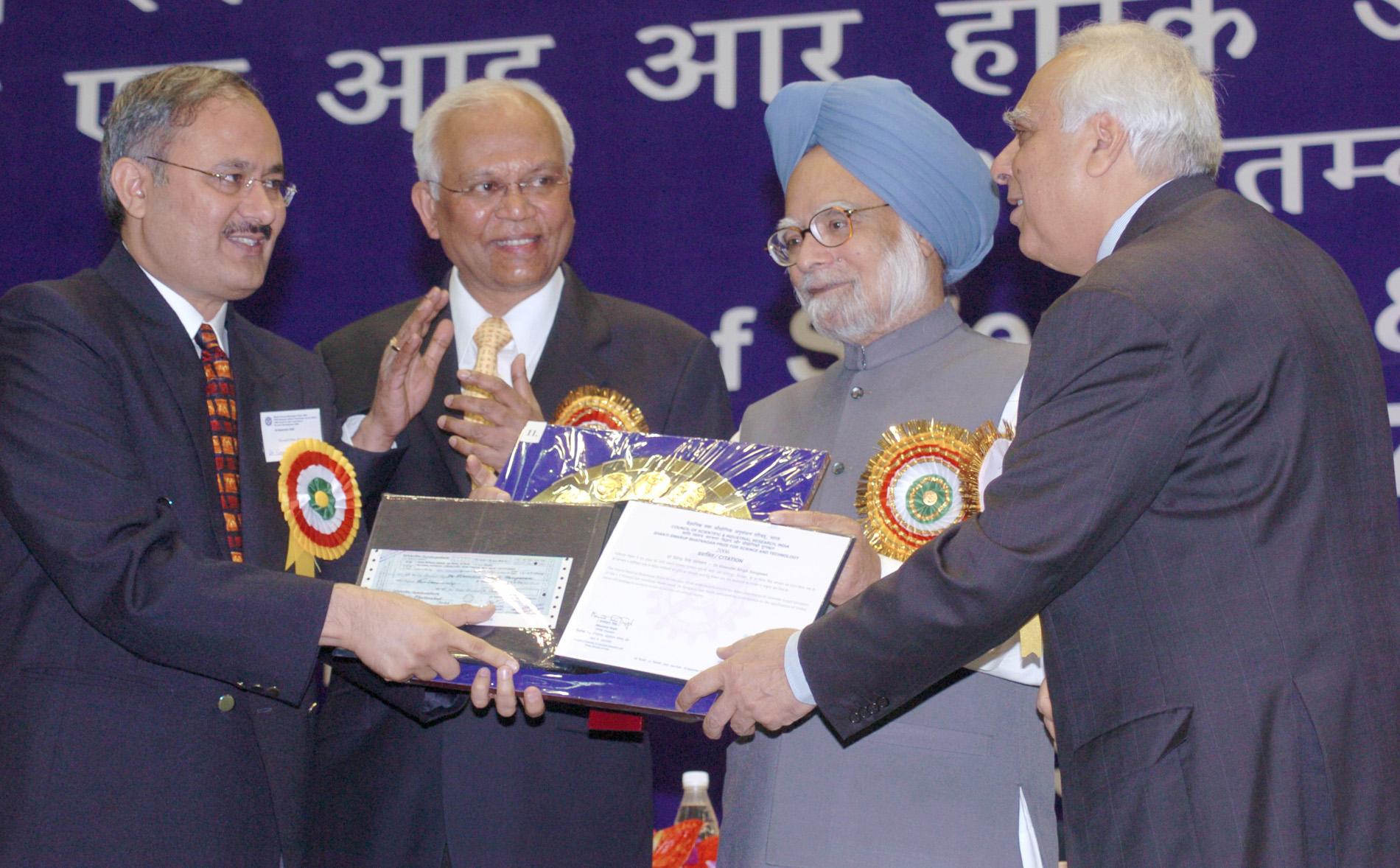
V.S.Sangwan receiving Santi Swarup Bhatnagar Prize in 2006.

Sangwan received the Dr. P. Siva Reddy Researcher of the Year Award of the Andhra Pradesh Akademi of Sciences in 2002 and two of his papers won the Dr. Vengal Rao Award of Andhra Pradesh Ophthalmic Society and Col. Rangachary Award of the All India Ophthalmology Society in 2003 and 2005 respectively. The Council of Scientific and Industrial Research awarded him Shanti Swarup Bhatnagar Prize, one of the highest Indian science awards in 2006. and he received the National Technology Award of the Department of Biotechnology in 2007. He is also a recipient of Achievement Award of the American Academy of Ophthalmology and Fortune magazine published a report on the stem cell research of Sangwan in its October 2007 issue.

== Selected bibliography ==
- M.S Sridhar, Aashish K Bansal, Virender S Sangwan, Gullapalli N Rao (2000). "Amniotic membrane transplantation in acute chemical and thermal injury". American Journal of Ophthalmology. 130 (1): 134–137. doi:10.1016/S0002-9394(00)00500-6. PMID 11004281.
- Fernandes, Merle; Sridhar, Mittanamalli S; Sangwan, Virender S, Rao, Gullapalli N (2005). "Amniotic Membrane Transplantation for Ocular Surface Reconstruction". Cornea. 24 (6): 643–653. doi:10.1097/01.ico.0000151501.80952.c5. PMID 16015081. S2CID 37918350.
- Virender S. Sangwan, Himanshu P. Matalia, Geeta K. Vemuganti, Ghazala Ifthekar, Anees Fatima, Shashi Singh, Gullapalli N. Rao (2005). "Early Results of Penetrating Keratoplasty After Cultivated Limbal Epithelium Transplantation". Arch. Ophthalmol. 123 (3): 334–340. doi:10.1001/archopht.123.3.334. PMID 15767475.
- Fatima A, Sangwan VS, Iftekhar G, Reddy P, Matalia H, Balasubramanian D, Vemuganti GK (2006). "Technique of cultivating limbal derived corneal epithelium on human amniotic membrane for clinical transplantation". Journal of Postgraduate Medicine. 52 (4): 257–61. PMID 17102542. S2CID 9303739.
- Indumathi Mariappan, Savitri Maddileti, Soumya Savy, Shubha Tiwari, Subhash Gaddipati, Anees Fatima, Virender S Sangwan, Dorairajan Balasubramanian, Geeta K Vemuganti (2010). "In vitro culture and expansion of human limbal epithelial cells". Nature Protocols. 5 (8): 1470–1479. doi:10.1038/nprot.2010.115. PMID 20671730. S2CID 8086269.
- Virender S Sangwan, Rajat Jain, Sayan Basu, Anupam B Bagadi, Shraddha Sureka, Indumathi Mariappan, Sheila MacNeil (2014). "Transforming ocular surface stem cell research into successful clinical practice". Indian Journal of Ophthalmology. 62 (1): 29–40. doi:10.4103/0301-4738.126173. PMC 3955067. PMID 24492499.

== See also ==
- Corneal epithelium
- Regenerative medicine
- Corneal transplantation
- Regeneration in humans
