= Patricia Bath =

First African American woman doctor to receive a patent for a medical invention

Patricia Era Bath
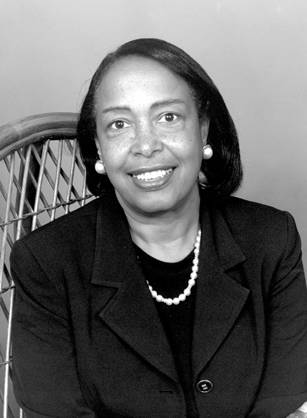
- Born: November 4, 1942; New York City, U.S.
- Died: May 30, 2019 (aged 76); San Francisco, California, U.S.
- Education: Hunter College (B.A.); Howard University (M.D.)
- Occupations: Ophthalmologist, humanitarian
- Awards: National Inventors Hall of Fame; National Women's Hall of Fame

Patricia Era Bath (November 4, 1942 – May 30, 2019) was an African American ophthalmologist and humanitarian, known for championing a community-focused approach to eye care and for innovations in cataract surgery. She became the first woman to lead a postgraduate training program in ophthalmology, and the first woman elected to the honorary staff of the UCLA Medical Center. Bath was the first African-American to serve as a resident in ophthalmology at New York University. She was also the first African-American woman to serve on staff as a surgeon at the UCLA Medical Center.

Born in New York City, Bath received a National Science Foundation scholarship as a high school student to study the metabolic behavior of cancer. She graduated from Hunter College in 1964 with a degree in chemistry, and enrolled in Howard University College of Medicine in Washington, DC. She organized a contingent of students to provide services to the Poor People's Campaign in 1968. After graduation, she returned to New York to intern at Harlem Hospital Center, where she began research on eye diseases. She was an ophthalmology resident at New York University from 1970 to 1973, and then a fellow at Columbia University for one year. In 1974 she joined the faculty of the Jules Stein Eye Institute, making her the first female ophthalmology professor at the David Geffen School of Medicine at the University of California, Los Angeles.

Bath's research showed that blindness, especially caused by glaucoma, was more prevalent among Black Americans than the general population. In 1976, she co-founded the nonprofit American Institute for the Prevention of Blindness in Washington, D.C., to advance a program of "community ophthalmology" that would expand the availability of treatment for, education about, and prevention of eye diseases to medically underserved populations.

In the 1980s, Bath's development of the laserphaco probe led to safer and more precise cataract surgery. With the device, she became the first African-American woman doctor to receive a patent for a medical purpose.

== Early life and education ==
Born in 1942 in Harlem, New York, Patricia Bath was the daughter of Rupert and Gladys Bath. Her father was an immigrant from Trinidad, a newspaper columnist, a merchant seaman, and the first black man to work for the New York City Subway as a motorman. Her father inspired her love for culture and encouraged her to explore different cultures. Her mother was descended from African slaves and Cherokee Native Americans.

== Parental influence ==
Throughout her childhood, Bath was often told by her parents to "never settle for less than [her] best" and was encouraged by their support of her education. Her mother, encouraging her dreams and love of science, had bought her first chemistry set when she was 12. By the time she had reached high school, Bath was already a National Science Foundation Scholar. This led to her cancer research earning a front-page feature in the New York Times. Patricia and her brother attended Charles Evans Hughes High School, where both students excelled in science and math.

== Cancer research project ==
Inspired by the French Nobel Peace Prize laureate Albert Schweitzer's work in medicine, Bath applied for and won a National Science Foundation Scholarship while attending high school; this led her to a research project at Yeshiva University and Harlem Hospital Center studying connections between cancer, nutrition, and stress. In this summer program, led by Rabbi Moses D. Tendler, Bath studied the effects of streptomycin residue on bacteria. Through this, she was able to conclude that cancer itself was a catabolic disease and tumor growth was a symptom. She had also discovered a mathematical equation that could be used to predict cancer cell growth. The head of the research program realized the significance of her findings and published them in a scientific paper. Her discoveries were also shared at the International Fifth Congress of Nutrition in the fall of 1960.

In 1960, at the age of eighteen, Bath won a Merit Award from Mademoiselle magazine for her contribution to the project.

Bath received her Bachelor of Arts in chemistry from Manhattan's Hunter College in 1964. She then relocated to Washington, D.C., to attend Howard University College of Medicine. Her first year at Howard coincided with the Civil Rights Act of 1964. She co-founded the Student National Medical Association and became its first woman president in 1965. At Howard, she was awarded a Children's Bureau National Government Fellowship Award to do research in Belgrade, Yugoslavia, in the summer of 1967, where her research focused on pediatric surgery. The highlight of the award ceremony was the meeting with Earl Warren, Chief Justice of the United States Supreme Court, at the U.S. Embassy in Belgrade. Bath graduated with honors from Howard University College of Medicine in 1968. She was awarded the Edwin Watson Prize for Excellence in Ophthalmology by her mentor, Lois A. Young.

The assassination of Martin Luther King Jr. in 1968 spurred Bath to join the Poor People's Campaign. She organized and led Howard University medical students in providing volunteer healthcare services to the Campaign's encampment at Resurrection City in the summer of 1968.

Bath returned to her Harlem community and interned at Harlem Hospital Center, which had just become affiliated with Columbia University College of Physicians and Surgeons. During her internship, she observed large proportions of blind patients at Harlem Hospital in comparison to patients at the Columbia University Eye Clinic. Before beginning her ophthalmology residency study at NYU in 1970, Bath was awarded a one-year fellowship from Columbia University to study and contribute to eye care services at Harlem Hospital. She began collecting data on blindness and visual impairment at Harlem Hospital, which did not have any ophthalmologists on staff. Her data and passion for improvement persuaded her professors from Columbia to begin operating on blind patients, without charge, at Harlem Hospital Center. Bath was proud to be on the Columbia team that performed the first eye surgery at Harlem Hospital in November 1969.

Bath completed her residency in ophthalmology at New York University from 1970 to 1973, the first African American to do so. She gave birth to her daughter, Eraka, in 1972.

== Career ==
After completing her residency at New York University, Bath began a corneal fellowship program at Columbia University, which focused on corneal transplantation and keratoprosthesis surgery (1973 to 1974). While a fellow, she was recruited by both the UCLA Jules Stein Eye Institute and Charles R. Drew University to co-found an ophthalmology residency program at Martin Luther King Jr. Hospital. She then began her career in Los Angeles, becoming the first woman ophthalmologist on the medical school faculty at the Jules Stein Eye Institute at UCLA. When asked who her mentor was, Bath responded that her relationship with family physician Cecil Marquez inspired her to pursue this specific career. She was appointed assistant chief of the King-Drew-UCLA Ophthalmology Residency Program in 1974 and was appointed chief in 1983.

At both institutions, Bath rose to the rank of associate professor. At UCLA, she founded the Ophthalmic Assistant Training Program (OATP) in 1978. The graduates of the OATP serve as key personnel providing screening, health education, and support for blindness prevention strategies.

While at UCLA Jules Stein Eye Institute, Bath established the Keratoprosthesis Program to provide advanced surgical treatment for blind patients. The program continues today as the KPRO, and thousands of patients have had their eyesight restored with this innovative technology. Based on her research and achievements with keratoprosthesis, Bath was chosen to lead the first national keratoprosthesis study in 1983.

In 1983, Bath was appointed Chair of the KING-DREW-UCLA Ophthalmology Residency Program, becoming the first woman in the US to head an ophthalmology residency program.

While at UCLA, Bath wanted to pursue research but was denied grants and resources by the National Institutes of Health and the National Eye Institute. It was then that she had decided to look further for the best laboratories in the world, to support her plans for innovation in the world of ophthalmology. In 1986, Bath elected to take a sabbatical from clinical and administrative responsibilities and concentrate on research. She resigned her position as chair of ophthalmology and followed her research pursuits as visiting professor at centers of excellence in France, England, and Germany. In France, she served as a visiting professor at the Rothschild Eye Institute of Paris with Director Daniele Aron-Rosa. In England, she served as a visiting professor with Professor David C. Emmony at the Loughborough University of Technology. In Germany, she served as a visiting professor at the Free University of Berlin and the laser medical center.

In 1993, Bath retired from UCLA, which subsequently elected her the first woman on its honorary staff.

Bath served as a professor of ophthalmology at Howard University's School of Medicine and as a professor of telemedicine and ophthalmology at St. George's University ophthalmology training program. As a strong advocate for telemedicine, Bath supported the development of virtual labs as a part of the curriculum in ophthalmology residency training programs, to provide surgeons with more realistic experience made possible by 3D imaging. In an article written by Bath in the Journal of Cataract and Refractive Surgery, she proved that with better training and supervision in residency programs, students were able to achieve better results in their surgeries, leading to greater visual acuity.

Bath lectured internationally and authored over 100 papers.

=== Blindness studies and community ophthalmology ===
Based on her observations at Harlem Hospital, Bath published the first scientific paper showing the higher prevalence of blindness among Blacks. Bath also found that African American people had an eight times higher prevalence of glaucoma as a cause of blindness.

Based on her research, Bath pioneered the discipline of community ophthalmology in 1976. After observing epidemic rates of preventable blindness among underserved populations in urban areas in the US as well as underserved populations in Third World countries. Community ophthalmology was described as a new discipline in medicine that promotes eye health and blindness prevention through programs using methodologies from public health, community medicine, and ophthalmology to bring necessary eye care to underserved populations.

=== Humanitarian work ===
Bath's main humanitarian efforts were at the American Institute for the Prevention of Blindness(AIPB). Co-founded in 1976 with Alfred Cannon, an American psychiatrist and community organizer, and Aaron Ifekwunigwe, a Nigerian-born pediatrician and human rights advocate, the organization was created on the principle that "eyesight was a basic human right." Through this organization, Bath spread eye care worldwide by providing newborns with free eye drops, vitamins, and vaccinations against diseases that can cause blindness, including measles. Bath spent her time as director traveling the world performing surgeries, teaching, and lecturing at colleges. Bath claimed her "personal best moment" was while she was in North Africa and, using keratoprosthesis, was able to restore the sight of a woman who been blind for over 30 years.

With AIPB, Bath traveled to Tanzania in 2005, where cataracts were the main cause of childhood blindness. In Africa, AIPB provided computers and other digital resources for visually impaired students, specifically at the Mwereni School for the Blind in Tanzania and St. Oda School for the Visually Impaired in Kenya.

Bath was recognized for her philanthropic work in the field of ophthalmology by President Barack Obama. In 2009 she was on stage with President Obama and was appointed to commission for digital accessibility to blind children.

In April 2019, Bath testified in a hearing called the "Trailblazers and Lost Einsteins: Women Inventors and the Future of American Innovation" at the Senate Office Building in Washington D.C. Bath discussed gender disparities in the STEM and lack of female inventors.

=== Inventions ===
In 1986, Bath conducted research in the laboratory of Danièle Aron-Rosa, a pioneer researcher in lasers and ophthalmology at Rothschild Eye Institute of Paris, and then at the Laser Medical Center in Berlin, where she was able to begin early studies in laser cataract surgery, including her first experiment with excimer laser photoablation using human eye bank eyes.

Bath coined the term "laser phaco" for the process, short for laser photoablative cataract surgery, and developed the laserphaco probe, a medical device that improves on the use of lasers to remove cataracts, and "for ablating and removing cataract lenses". Bath first had the idea for this type of device in 1981, but did not apply for a patent until several years later. The device was completed in 1986 after Bath conducted research on lasers in Berlin and patented in 1988, making her the first African-American woman to receive a patent for a medical purpose. The device – which quickly and nearly painlessly dissolves the cataract with a laser, irrigates and cleans the eye and permits the easy insertion of a new lens – is used internationally to treat the disease. Bath continued to improve the device and successfully restored vision to people who had been unable to see for decades. The laserphaco probe was safer and more accurate than previous methods, and reduced surgical error rates.

Bath held five patents in the United States. Three of Bath's five patents relate to the Laserphaco Probe. In 2000, she was granted a patent for a method for using pulsed ultrasound to remove cataracts, and in 2003 a patent for combining laser and ultrasound to remove cataracts.

==== List of U.S. patents ====
- U.S. patent 4744360, "Apparatus for ablating and removing cataract lenses", issued May 17, 1988
- U.S. patent 5843071, "Method and apparatus for ablating and removing cataract lenses" issued December 1, 1998
- U.S. patent 5919186, "Laser apparatus for surgery of cataractous lenses", issued July 6, 1999.
- U.S. patent 6083192, "Pulsed ultrasound method for fragmenting/emulsifying and removing cataractous lenses, issued July 4, 2000.
- U.S. patent 6544254, "Combination ultrasound and laser method and apparatus for removing cataract lenses", issued April 8, 2003.

== Honors and awards ==
- 1995: NAACP Legal Defense and Educational Fund's Black Woman of Achievement Award
- 2000: Smithsonian Museum's Lemelson Center for the Study of Invention and Innovation included her in the Innovative Lives program
- 2001: American Medical Women's Association induction into Hall of Fame
- 2006: Tubman's Sheila Award
- 2011: Dr. Bath was interviewed for the American Academy of Ophthalmology's Museum of Vision oral history collection that "preserves the memories and experiences of people whose lives are an inspiration."
- 2012: Tribeca Film Festival Disruptive Innovation Award
- 2013: Association of Black Women Physicians Lifetime Achievement Award for Ophthalmology Contributions
- 2014: Alpha Kappa Alpha Presidential Award for Health and medical Sciences
- 2014: Howard University Charter Day Award for Distinguished Achievement in Ophthalmology and Medicine
- 2017: Medscape one of 12 "Women Physicians who Changed the Course of American Medicine"
- 2017: Time Magazine "Firsts: Women Who Are Changing the World" for being the first to invent and demonstrate laserphaco cataract surgery
- 2017: Hunter College Hall of Fame induction
- 2018: New York Academy of Medicine John Stearns Medal for Distinguished Contributions in Clinical Practice, for invention of laserphaco cataract surgery
- 2018: Alliance for Aging research: Silver Innovator Award for contributions and research towards blindness prevention
- 2021, it was announced that she would be one of the first two black women (along with Marian Croak) to be inducted into the National Inventors Hall of Fame.
- 2024, inducted into the National Women's Hall of Fame

Dr. Bath had also been a Fellow of the American College of Surgeons from 1976 to 1989, a fellow of the American Academy of Ophthalmology, as well as a member of the American Society of Cataract and Refractive Surgery and the Association for Research in Vision and Ophthalmology.

Bath was honored by two of her universities. Hunter College placed her in its "Hall of Fame" in 1988 and Howard University declared her a "Howard University Pioneer in Academic Medicine" in 1993. Several books for young people have been published about her life and work in science, including "Patricia's Vision: The Doctor Who Saved Sight" by Michelle Lord; "Patricia Bath and Laser Surgery" by Ellen Labrecqua, and "The Doctor with an Eye for Eyes: The Story of Dr. Patricia Bath" by Julia Finley Mosca, which was cited by both the National Science Teachers Association and the Chicago Public Library's list of best children's books of the year. She is also the subject of a short play, "The Prize (about Dr. Patricia Bath)" by Cynthia L. Cooper

== See also ==
- Timeline of women in science
- List of African-American inventors and scientists
- List of Alpha Kappa Alpha sisters
- List of people from Harlem
