= ASCRS =

ASCRS may refer to:

- American Society of Colon and Rectal Surgeons, a professional society for surgeons specializing in colorectal surgery
- American Society of Cataract and Refractive Surgery, a professional society for surgeons specializing in eye surgery
