= Deutsches Museum (disambiguation) =

Deutsches Museum may mean:

- The Deutsches Museum, a science and technology museum in Munich
- The Deutsches Museum Berlin, once part of the Antikensammlung Berlin
- The Deutsches Museum Bonn, a museum with exhibits and experiments of famous scientists, engineers and inventors
