= Alice McPherson =

Canadian physician and academic (1926–2023)

- Born: June 20, 1926; Saskatchewan
- Died: January 16, 2023 (aged 96)
- Education: University of Wisconsin–Madison
- Scientific career
- Workplaces: Massachusetts Eye and Ear; University of Wisconsin–Madison

Alice McPherson (June 20, 1926 – January 16, 2023) was a Canadian-born physician and professor who dedicated her career to the diagnosis and treatment of retinal disease. She founded the Retina Research Foundation and the McPherson Eye Research Institute. She was awarded the University of Lausanne Gonin Medal in 2014.

== Early life and education ==
McPherson was born in Saskatchewan. She spent her childhood in Minnesota and Wisconsin. She studied medicine at the University of Wisconsin–Madison, and completed a residency in ophthalmology in 1955. She said that she chose to specialise in ophthalmology because she realised how important vision was to wellbeing. She was a fellow with Charles Schepens at Massachusetts Eye and Ear. At the time she was training, there were not many cures for retinal detachment. McPherson was the first woman fellow to work in vitreoretinal surgery.

== Research ==
In 1958, McPherson moved to Texas, where she joined the Baylor College of Medicine. She pioneered several procedures in retinal surgery, including cryotherapy, laser photocoagulation and serial buckling. She was a proponent of photocoagulation in the treatment of diabetic retinopathy. She became the first woman to be accepted to the European Jules Gonin club.

In 1969, McPherson founded the Retina Research Foundation, which looked to eradicate retinal disease worldwide. The Foundation provided funding to researchers working on retinal diseases and established professorships at major research institutions. From 1969 to 2023 the foundation awarded over $40 million to researchers working in ophthalmology. In 2002 McPherson helped to establish the University of Wisconsin Eye Research Institute, which became known as the McPherson Eye Research Institute in her honour in 2012. She served on their Board of Directors.

In 1969, McPherson founded the Retina Research Foundation, which would become one of the leading eye research organisations in the word.

== Awards and honours ==
- President of the Retina Society
- 1995 President of the Pan-American Association of Ophthalmology Foundation
- 2014 University of Lausanne Gonin Medal
- 2015 University of Wisconsin–Madison Distinguished Alumni
- 2019 Retina Hall of Fame Award
- 2020 Albert Nelson Marquis Lifetime Achievement Award
- Elected Fellow of the American College of Surgeons
- Elected Fellow of the International College of Surgeons

== Selected publications ==
- Stephen G Schwartz; Derek P Kuhl; Alice R McPherson; Eric R Holz; William F Mieler (1 March 2002). "Twenty-year follow-up for scleral buckling". JAMA Ophthalmology. 120 (3): 325–329. doi:10.1001/archopht.120.3.325. ISSN 0003-9950. PMID 11879136. Wikidata Q43905900.
- Font RL; Moura RA; Shetlar DJ; Martinez JA; McPherson AR (1 January 1989). "Combined hamartoma of sensory retina and retinal pigment epithelium". Retina. 9 (4): 302–311. doi:10.1097/00006982-198909040-00011. ISSN 0275-004X. PMID 2697919. Wikidata Q38775601.
- H. M. Hittner; L. M. Rhodes; A. R. McPherson (1 May 1979). "Anterior segment abnormalities in cicatricial retinopathy of prematurity". Ophthalmology. 86 (5): 803–816. doi:10.1016/s0161-6420(79)35437-9. ISSN 0161-6420. PMID 583499. Wikidata Q42149793.
