= Gerhard Meyer-Schwickerath =

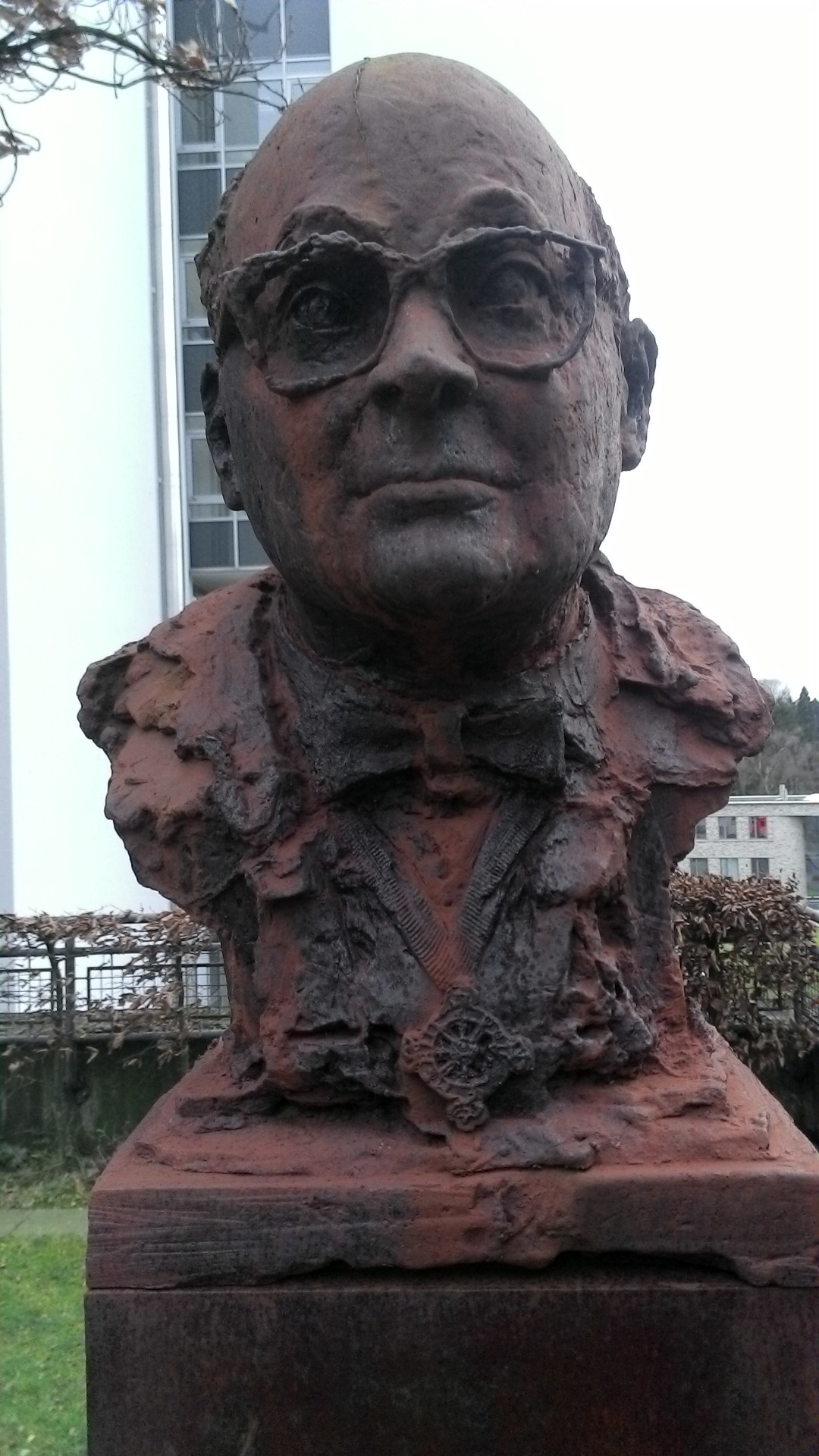
- Bust of Meyer-Schwickerath
- Born: 10 July 1920; Elberfeld, Germany
- Died: 20 January 1992 (aged 71); Essen, Germany
- Education: University of Bonn
- Known for: Invention of light coagulation
- Awards: Pour le Mérite; Gonin Medal
- Scientific career
- Fields: Ophthalmology
- Workplaces: University of Hamburg-Eppendorf; University of Bonn; Essen University Hospital; University of Münster

Gerhard Rudolph Edmund Meyer-Schwickerath (10 July 1920 – 20 January 1992) was a German ophthalmologist, university lecturer and researcher. He is known as the father of light coagulation which was the predecessor to many eye surgeries.

== Early life ==
Gerhard Rudolph Meyer was born as the son of Edmund Meyer (1887–1973) and Josephine Meyer B. Schmitz (1890–1959) in Elberfeld, Germany. In 1935, the family also adopted surname of Edmund Meyer's mother, Julie Schwickerath (1860–1929) and henceforth Gerhard Rudolph Meyer was stylized as Meyer-Schwickerath. One year after Gerhard's birth, his younger brother, Klaus Meyer-Schwickerath, was born, who went on to study law and become a politician.

After graduating from high school, Meyer-Schwickerath decided not to be a lawyer, contrary to the family tradition, because he did not want to defend Nazism. He opted to become a physician instead. He began his medical studies in 1940. During the World War II he worked as a medic. A knee injury saved him from working on the front lines.

== Career ==
Shortly after the war, Meyer-Schwickerath moved to Hamburg, where he worked as an assistant physician at the University of Hamburg-Eppendorf's eye clinic until 1952. In 1953, he received his post-doctoral degree and the right to professorship at the University of Bonn. In 1959, he worked as senior physician with Paul Mikat and Kurt Biedenkopf to transform Essen's municipal hospital into the Essen University Hospital.

From 1959 to his retirement in 1985, Meyer-Schwickerath served as the Director of the Ophthalmology Center at the Essen University Hospital. In 1964, he took the position of professor at the University of Münster. He was an honorary member and president (1973–75) of the German Ophthalmological Society (DOG). One of his most famous patients was Leonard Bernstein.

=== Invention of Photocoagulation ===
Meyer-Schwickerath examined many patients whose retinas were damaged following total solar eclipse of 9 July 1945. He noticed that the retinal scars were the result of surface diathermy. In 1946/1947, Meyer-Schwickerath determined that a progressive retinal detachment could be halted through precision scars. According to some accounts, the idea of producing a scar by means of light came to him following a sleepless night, in which, for fear of forgetting, he had recorded the two words "light" and "coagulation" on a note. In 1946, he started conducted the first experiments on light coagulation. In 1949, he performed the first successful treatment of a retinal detachment with a light beam (light coagulation) by with a self-constructed device on the roof of the ophthalmic clinic at the University of Hamburg-Eppendorf. This first device focused sunlight through a telescope and utilized a series of mirrors leading into the operating room and into the eye of a Patients. Since sunlight is not always reliable due to cloud coverage, this method proved to be unsatisfactory in the long run to Meyer-Schwickerath.

In the 1950s, he collaborated with the Zeiss Labs to develop the high pressure xenon gas discharge lamp, which eliminated the need for sunlight and produced a stronger beam for coagulation. "His method of photo- or light coagulation has now been replaced by the application of the laser, but nothing has changed in the principle of the treatment of pre-stages of retinal detachment, of tumors and vascular diseases, and of diabetic eye changes."

The Deutschmuseum Bonn is the loan of the optical museum of the company Carl Zeiss in Oberkochen, the original part of the sunlight coagulator developed by Meyer-Schwickerath from 1949 under the inventory number 1994 – L11.000.

== Personal life ==
In 1945, after the war and graduation, Meyer-Schwickerath married 22-year-old Berta Steinbicker in Münster. They had three sons and one daughter.

== Legacy ==
With the development of the light coagulation technique and his later work, Meyer-Schwickerath acquired an international reputation. At the 2007 DOG congress, Charles P. Wilkinson, president of the American Academy of Ophthalmology, counted Meyer-Schwickerath among the pantheon of German medical figures. Wilkinson said, "I can assure you that the names von Graefe, Helmholtz, Leber, all the way up to Custodis, Meyer-Schwickerath – these legendary names are known to virtually every resident who has ever trained in America."

== Honors ==
Gerhard Meyer-Schwickerath received numerous awards and honorary doctorate different universities. His name was proposed for the Nobel Prize three times, but he did not receive it. He regarded his greatest prize of the Order Pour le Mérite for science and the arts. Other awards:

- 1960: Graefe Prize of the German Ophthalmological Society
- 1969: Election in the German Academy of Natural Scientists Leopoldina
- 1978: Pour le Mérite
- 1981: Large Federal Service Cross with Stern
- 1986: Order of Merit of North Rhine-Westphalia
- 1986: Graefe Medal of the German Ophthalmological Society
- 1989: State Prize of the State of North Rhine-Westphalia
