= Nakajima =

Nakajima (中島) is a Japanese name. It is also sometimes romanized as Nakashima and sometimes written as 中嶋. It may refer to:

== Places ==
- Nakashima District, Aichi, former district in Japan, now part of Inazawa, Aichi.
- Nakajima, Ehime, former town in Japan
- Nakajima, Fukushima, a village in Japan
- Nakajima, Ishikawa, former town in Japan

== Other uses ==
- Nakajima (surname), a Japanese surname
- Nakajima Aircraft Company, a prominent Japanese aircraft manufacturer throughout World War II
- Nakajima USA, a plush toy company
- Nakajima Racing, a Super Formula and Super GT car racing team
