= Recordon =

Recordon is a surname. Notable people with the surname include:

- Benjamin Recordon (1845–1938), Swiss architect
- David Recordon (born 1986), American web developer
- Frédéric Recordon (1811–1889), Swiss physician and ophthalmologist
- Lionel Recordon (1907–1988), British cricketer
- Luc Recordon (born 1955), Swiss politician
