= Peter J. McDonnell =

U.S. ophthalmologist

Peter J. McDonnell is an American ophthalmologist who is the director of the Wilmer Ophthalmological Institute and the William Holland Wilmer Professor of Ophthalmology at the Johns Hopkins School of Medicine.

== Life ==
McDonnell completed a bachelor's degree in chemistry at Dartmouth College. He earned a M.D. from the Johns Hopkins School of Medicine in 1982. In 1986, McDonnell completed a residency in ophthalmology at the Wilmer Ophthalmological Institute and a fellowship in cornea and external diseases at the Doheny Eye Institute in 1987.

McDonnell joined the Wilmer Ophthalmological Institute as an assistant chief of service. He later was a faculty member at the University of Southern California where he became a full professor in 1994. In 1999, he became the Irving H. Leopold Professor and chair of the department of ophthalmology at the University of California, Irvine. In 2003, he joined the Wilmer Ophthalmological Institute as the sixth William Holland Wilmer Professor and Director.
