= Paul Bailliart =

French ophthalmologist

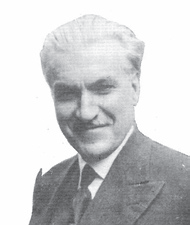
- photo taken in the 1950s

Paul Alfred Marie Bailliart (9 November 1877, in Poitiers – 29 October 1969, in Val-de-Grâce, in Paris) was a French ophthalmologist.

== Biography ==
Bailliart graduated from the lycée of Besançon and then joined the army in the École du Service de Santé of Lyon to acquire an education in medicine.

In 1900 he completed his medical education and successfully defended his thesis Traitement chirurgical de la myopie, en particulier par la suppression du cristallin (Surgical treatment of myopia, in particular by removing the lens).

He went to Paris in 1907 to work with Victor Morax and in 1909 became a member of the Société d'Ophtalmologie de Paris, of which he was the Secretary General from 1922 to 1938. Bailliart was a military doctor during WW I and joined in 1929, as department head, the Quinze-Vingts National Ophthalmology Hospital and remained in that position until his retirement in 1943. He also served a term as the president of the European Society of Ophthalmology (SOE) and in various capacities for several other international organizations.

He gained an international reputation for his work on the retinal circulation, the ophthalmological manuals he co-authored, and his development of Bailliart's ophthalmodynamometer, Bailliart's goniometer, and Bailliart's tonometer. He also published works concerned with the education of the blind.

For his work as a physician and teacher, Bailliart was made an Officer of the French Legion of Honor, was awarded the Ordre des Palmes Académiques, and won the Donders Medal (1939) and the Gonin Medal (1945). He was the mayor of Massy, Essonne from 1926 to 1935 and wrote a history of this town. In Massy he acquired (and named Chambertrand) a house which belonged to the historian Fustel de Coulanges and now houses a center of Cimade.

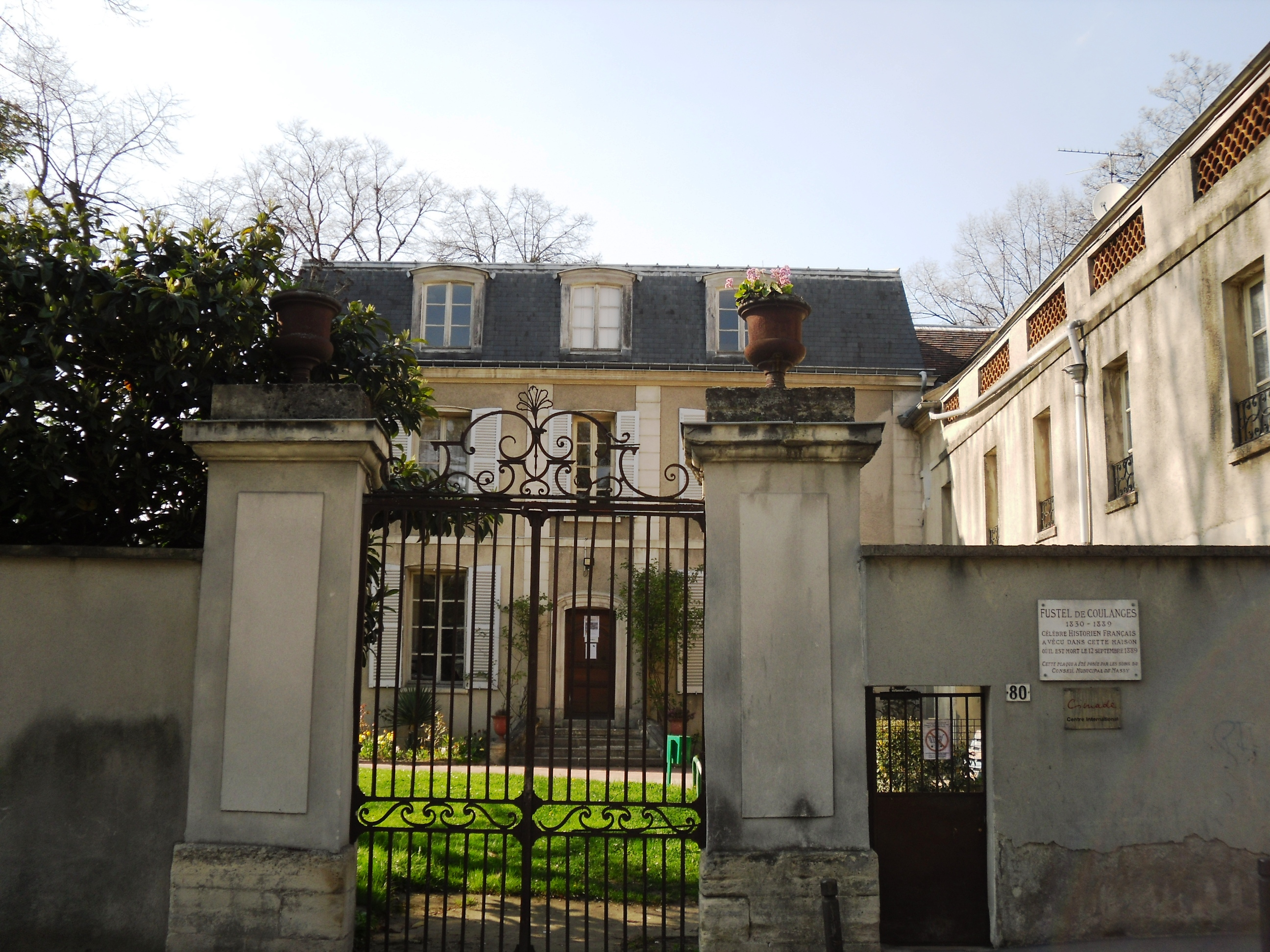
La maison de Paul Bailliart à Massy

In this house and under its aegis, Bailliart's granddaughter and her husband Raymond Rodriguez created in the 1960s the Centre Culturel de Massy (CCM). The Centre Culturel Paul Bailliart built in 1969 and now known as Paul B. is the successor of CCM.

Bailliart was predeceased by his wife and buried in Massy.

== Sources ==
- Paul Bailliart, Histoires de famille, Paris, Badiane, 1990.
- Paul Bailliart, Histoire de Massy, Paris, Le livre d'histoire, 2003.
- Louis Guillaumat, Jean-Pierre Bailliart, Les Quinze-vingts de Paris : échos historiques du XIIIe au XXe siècle, Paris, Société francophone d'histoire de l'ophtalmologie, 1998.
- British Journal of Ophthalmology, 1970;54:72 Obituary. Paul Bailliart
