= Marc Dufour (ophthalmologist) =

Swiss ophthalmologist (1843–1910)

Marc Dufour (21 April 1843 in Villeneuve – 29 July 1910 in Lausanne) was a Swiss ophthalmologist.

In 1865 he received his medical doctorate from the University of Zurich with the dissertation "La constance de la force et les mouvements musculaires". In Zurich he studied ophthalmology with Johann Friedrich Horner, then continued his education at Berlin as a pupil of Albrecht von Graefe. In 1869 he began work as an assistant to Frédéric Recordon at the Asile des Aveugles (Asylum for the Blind) in Lausanne. Later on, he became chief physician of the asylum and ophthalmic hospital. From 1890 to 1909 he was a professor of ophthalmology at the University of Lausanne, where in 1894 he was chosen as rector.

From 1874 to 1886 he served as a city councilor in Lausanne — as a member of the Constituent Assembly (Vaud) in 1885 he voted in favor of women's suffrage. In 1910 he founded the "Asile Gabrielle-Dufour" for the visually impaired, an institution named in memory of his deceased daughter. In 1910 the "Prix Marc Dufour" was established to encourage medical research at the University of Lausanne.

With Jules Gonin, he was co-author of Traité des maladies de la rétine ("On maladies of the retina", 1906) and Traité des Maladies du nerf optique ("On maladies of the optic nerve", 1908). He also published biographies of his former mentors, Johann Frédéric Horner (1887) and Frédéric Recordon (1890).
