= Nakajima (surname) =

Nakajima (written: 中島), also transliterated as Nakashima, is the 23rd most common Japanese surname. A less common variant is 中嶋. Notable people with the surname include:

- Airi Nakajima (中島 愛里, born 1990), Japanese actress and gravure idol
- Akira Nakashima (中嶋 章, 1908–1970), Japanese electrical engineer
- Akira Nakajima (中島 章, 1923–2017), Japanese ophthalmologist
- Arisa Nakajima (中島 安里紗, born 1989), Japanese professional wrestler
- Atsushi Nakajima (中島 敦, 1909–1942), Japanese writer
- Brandon Nakashima (born 2001), American tennis player
- Chikuhei Nakajima (中島 知久平 1884–1949), Japanese aviation pioneer, founder of the Nakajima Aircraft Company
- Chris Nakashima-Brown, American science fiction author
- Daisuke Nakajima (中島 大祐, born 1989), Japanese British Formula 3 driver, younger brother of Kazuki Nakajima
- Emi Nakajima (中島 依美, born 1990), Japanese women's footballer
- George Nakashima (中島勝寿 Nakashima Katsutoshi, 1905–1990), Japanese-American woodworker, architect, and furniture maker
- Haruo Nakajima (中島 春雄, 1929–2017) Japanese actor, first person to portray Godzilla
- Hiraku Nakajima (中島 啓, born 1962), Japanese mathematician, 2003 Cole Prize winner
- Hiromi Nakashima (中島 宏海, born 1993), Japanese footballer
- Isao Nakajima (中島 功, born 1941), Japanese swimmer
- Issey Nakajima-Farran (born 1984), Canadian soccer player
- Katsuhiko Nakajima (中嶋 勝彦, born 1988), Japanese professional wrestler
- Kazuki Nakajima (中嶋 一貴, born 1985), Japanese Formula One driver, older brother of Daisuke Nakajima
- Keita Nakajima (born 2000), Japanese professional golfer
- Kenichi Nakajima (中島 健一, born 1978), Japanese visual artist
- Kenro Nakajima (中島 健郎, 1984– 2024), Japanese mountaineer
- Kento Nakajima (中島健人, born 1994), Japanese actor, model and idol
- Ko Nakajima (中嶋興, 1941–2025), Japanese video artist, photographer, and inventor
- Kyoko Nakajima (中島 京子, born 1964), Japanese writer
- Makoto Nakajima (中嶋 誠, born 1952), former commissioner of the Japan Patent Office
- Masashi Nakashima (中島 勝司, born 1962), Japanese diver
- Megumi Nakajima (中島 愛, born 1989), Japanese voice actress and singer
- Mie Nakashima (中島 史恵, born 1986), Japanese field hockey player
- Mika Nakashima (中島 美嘉, born 1983), Japanese singer, model, and actress
- Miyuki Nakajima (中島 みゆき, born 1952), Japanese singer, composer, lyricist and radio personality
- Sadao Nakajima (中島貞夫, born 1934), Japanese film director
- Saki Nakajima (voice actress) (中島 沙樹, born 1978), Japanese voice actress
- Saki Nakajima (singer) (中島 早貴, born 1994), J-pop singer in the Hello! Project group °C-ute
- Satoru Nakajima (中嶋 悟, born 1953), Japanese Formula One driver and father of Kazuki Nakajima
- Shiho Nakashima (中島 志保, born 1978), Japanese snowboarder
- Shota Nakajima (born 1989), American chef
- Shoya Nakajima (中嶋 翔哉, born 1994), Japanese football player
- Takaharu Nakajima (中嶋 敬春, born 1983), Japanese speed skater
- Tsuneyuki Nakajima (born 1954), Japanese professional golfer
- Yoji Nakajima (born 1964), Japanese wheelchair curler, 2010 Winter Paralympian
- Yu Nakajima (中島 悠, born 1991), Japanese Rubik's Cube solver
- Yuki Nakajima (中島 由貴, born 1990), Japanese biathlete
- Yuki Nakashima (footballer) (中島 裕希, born 1984), Japanese footballer
- Yumi Nakashima (中島優美, born 1979), Japanese vocalist, guitarist and singer-songwriter
- Yuto Nakajima (中島 裕翔, born 1993), J-pop singer, actor and dancer in the group Hey! Say! JUMP
- Yuki Nakashima (中島 由貴, born 1997), Japanese voice actor, bassist from an all-girl band Roselia (band)

== Fictional characters ==
- Characters from the "Magical Girl Lyrical Nanoha" anime series:
  - Genya Nakajima, Major in command of the 108th Battalion
  - Quint Nakajima
  - Ginga Nakajima
  - Subaru Nakajima
  - "Numbers" combat cyborg characters from the "Magical Girl Lyrical Nanoha Strikers" season:
    - Cinque Nakajima
    - Dieci Nakajima
    - Nove Nakajima
    - Wendi Nakajima
- Several characters from the Strike Witches manga/anime media franchise
- Character from both the "Bungo Stray Dogs" manga and anime series and the "Bungo and Alchemist" Japanese role-playing game:
  - Atsushi Nakajima
- The main character from the Digital Devil Story science fiction novels, named Akemi Nakajima. These novels inspired the creation of the Megami Tensei franchise.
