= Ignipuncture =

Closing a retinal separation by cauterisation

Ignipuncture (Latin: Ignis (fire) + puncture) is the procedure of closing a retinal separation by transfixation of the break via cauterization. The procedure was pioneered and named by Jules Gonin in the early 1900s. Due to the risk of severe complications and the advent of lasers for the controlled delivery of energy, ignipuncture became an obsolete procedure; since the 1980s, ignipuncture has been performed using safer techniques like endophotocoagulation.

== See also ==
- Eye surgery
