= Laser coagulation =

Procedure widely used in eye surgery

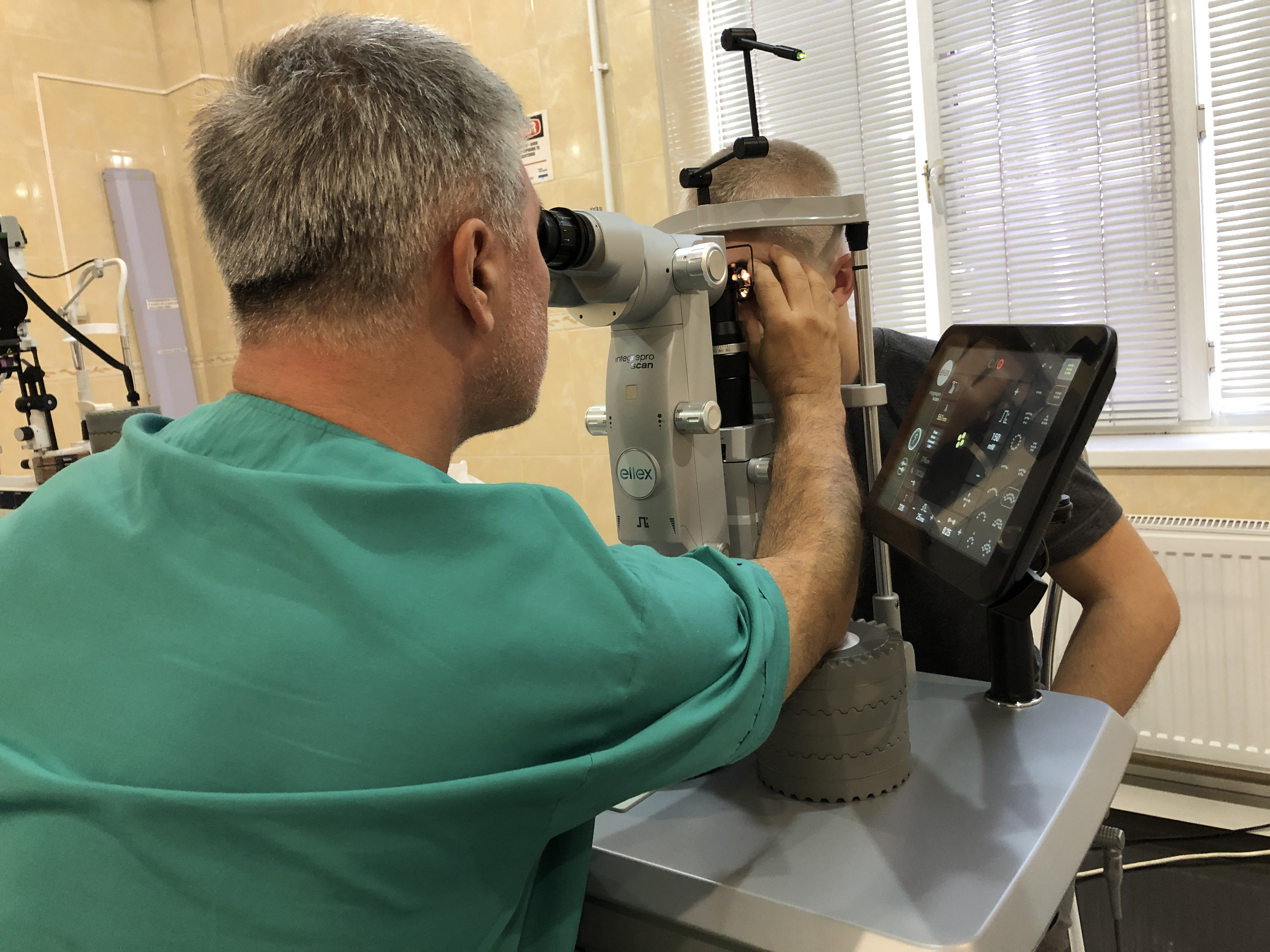
- Other names: Laser photocoagulation
- MeSH: D017075

Laser coagulation or laser photocoagulation surgery is used to treat a number of eye diseases and has become widely used. During the procedure, a laser is used to finely cauterize ocular blood vessels to attempt to bring about various therapeutic benefits. The ruby laser was first used in the 1960s but its red wavelength was less effective than green, which appeared in argon-ion lasers in 1969, but was ultimately replaced by the diode-pumped solid-state green laser.

The procedure is used mostly to close blood vessels in the eye, in certain kinds of diabetic retinopathy. It is used far less than in the past for age-related macular degeneration in favor of anti-VEGF drugs.

== Medical uses ==
=== Diabetic retinopathy ===
The American Academy of Ophthalmology practice guidelines recommend laser coagulation for people who have both mild to moderate nonproliferative diabetic retinopathy (NPDR) and clinically significant macular edema outside the fovea; treatment with anti-VEGF drugs is better than laser coagulation for clinically significant macular edema in the fovea. For people with severe NPDR and no macular edema, the AAO recommends laser photocoagulation for the peripheral retina. When there is macular edema, the laser coagulation is used to close leaking microaneurisms. While there is evidence that anti-VEGF drugs may be useful for proliferative diabetic retinopathy, laser coagulation to the peripheral retina is still preferred in the AAO recommendations, as there is long-term follow up data for laser treatment but not for drug treatment.

=== Diabetic macular edema ===
Anti-VEGF drugs are potentially superior to laser coagulation for diabetic macular edema; some specialists are using the drugs over laser coagulation.

=== Macular degeneration ===
The American Academy of Ophthalmology practice guidelines do not recommend laser coagulation therapy for macular degeneration, but it may be useful in people with new blood vessels in the choroid outside of the fovea who do not respond to treatment with anti-VEGF drugs.

Argon, krypton, dye and diode lasers have been used with varying levels of energy to try to prevent age-related macular degeneration by eliminating drusen. A Cochrane review published in 2015 found that while laser treatment reduces drusen, there is no difference from placebo at 2 years with respect to preventing vision loss.

A 2007 Cochrane review found that laser photocoagulation of new blood vessels in the choroid outside of the fovea using blue-green argon, green argon, red krypton, or near-infrared diode is effective and economical method, but that the benefits are limited for vessels next to or below the fovea.

=== Retinal tears ===
The laser is used to create a row of microscopic burns in the target tissue to cause scarring which will prevent the edges of the tear from detaching from the layer below. Laser photocoagulation can help prevent the deterioration of some retinal disorders and reduce the risk of future vision loss, but it cannot restore vision once it has been lost. The procedure is safe and effective for treating indicated retinal disorders, such as tears and glaucoma. It is typically an outpatient procedure lasting 15 to 20 minutes. The procedure is not entirely without risk. Damage will occur to light sensitive cells of the retina cauterised by the laser which will result in some loss of vision. Light from the laser is absorbed by the retinal pigment epithelium and by the underlying choroid, which raises the temperature by 20 °C to 30 °C. These thermal burns denature tissue protein, causing death of the affected retinal cells and coagulative necrosis.

=== Retinopathy caused by sickle cell disease ===
Laser coagulation has been used in people with sickle cell retinopathy. A 2015 Cochrane review found two clinical trials conducted in the 1980s using three approaches — one single-centre trial employed sectoral scatter laser photocoagulation using an argon laser; and in the second, two-centre trial focused on feeder vessel coagulation, one centre used an argon laser and the other used a xenon arc laser. Based on weak evidence, it appears that laser coagulation may be effective in preventing visual loss and vitreous haemorrhage in this condition but that it does not have an effect on regression of proliferative sickle retinopathy or preventing the development of new vessel growth.

=== Radiation proctitis ===
When radiation therapy is administered to treat cancers like cervical cancer, prostate cancer, and colorectal cancer, radiation proctitis can occur, which involves chronic bleeding in the rectum. Treatment with Nd:YAG lasers and with Nd:YAG laser passed through a Potassium titanyl phosphate crystal, and with an argon laser has been studied in small clinical trials. Nd:YAG laser has been abandoned due to risks of damaging the colon wall, fibrosis, stricture formation, and recto-vaginal fistula, and severe damage in case of accidents, as well as the cost. The other two modalities were largely replaced by argon plasma coagulation by 2011, which is safer and less expensive.

== Complications ==
In the eye, side effects and complications of laser photocoagulation are not infrequent and include loss of vision, worsening visual acuity, reduced night vision, and hemorrhaging in the eye. In about 8% of cases can cause scarring which in turn can lead to permanent central vision loss.

== History ==
German ophthalmologist, Gerhard Meyer-Schwickerath is widely credited with developing the predecessor of laser coagulation, photocoagulation. In 1946, he started conducted the first experiments on light coagulation. In 1949, he performed the first successful treatment of a retinal detachment with a light beam (light coagulation) using a self-constructed device on the roof of the ophthalmic clinic at the University of Hamburg-Eppendorf. Results of using laser coagulation to treat diabetic retinopathy were first published in 1954. Conventional macular focal and grid laser photocoagulation were established as the treatment of choice for diabetic macular edema in the Early Treatment Diabetic Retinopathy Study (ETDRS), which was published in 1985.

== See also ==
- List of laser articles
