= Wilmer Ophthalmological Institute =

Coordinates: 39.296647°N 76.593045°W

The Wilmer Ophthalmological Institute, also referred to as the Wilmer Eye Institute, is a component of the Johns Hopkins University School of Medicine.

Ophthalmologist William Holland Wilmer opened the Wilmer Eye Institute in 1925. Its home was completed four years later. Wilmer received an M.D. degree from the University of Virginia in 1885 and worked in New York, Washington D.C., in addition to Baltimore, where he established the institute. Alan C. Woods succeeded Wilmer as director in 1934. The third director, A. Edward Maumenee succeeded Woods in 1955. Arnall Patz became the fourth director in 1979. Morton F. Goldberg became director in 1989. Peter J. McDonnell has been Wilmer's director since 2003.
