= Cogan syndrome =

- Other names: Cogan's syndrome
- Specialty: Rheumatology

Cogan syndrome (also Cogan's syndrome) is a rare disorder characterized by recurrent inflammation of the front of the eye (the cornea) and often fever, fatigue, and weight loss, episodes of vertigo (dizziness), tinnitus (ringing in the ears) and hearing loss. It can lead to deafness or blindness if untreated. The classic form of the disease was first described by D. G. Cogan in 1945.

== Signs and symptoms ==
Cogan syndrome is a rare, rheumatic disease characterized by inflammation of the ears and eyes. Cogan syndrome can lead to vision difficulty, hearing loss and dizziness. The condition may also be associated with blood-vessel inflammation (called vasculitis) in other areas of the body that can cause major organ damage in 15% of those affected or, in a small number of cases, even death. It most commonly occurs in a person's 20s or 30s. The cause is not known. However, one theory is that it is an autoimmune disorder in which the body's immune system mistakenly attacks tissue in the eye and ear.

== Causes ==
It is currently thought that Cogan syndrome is an autoimmune disease. The inflammation in the eye and ear are due to the patient's own immune system producing antibodies that attack the inner ear and eye tissue. Autoantibodies can be demonstrated in the blood of some patients, and these antibodies have been shown to attack inner ear tissue in laboratory studies. Infection with the bacteria Chlamydia pneumoniae has been demonstrated in some patients prior to the development of Cogan syndrome, leading some researchers to hypothesize that the autoimmune disease may be initiated by the infection. C. pneumoniae is a common cause of mild pneumonia, and the vast majority of patients who are infected with the bacteria do not develop Cogan syndrome.

== Diagnosis ==
While the white blood cell count, erythrocyte sedimentation rate, and C-reactive protein tests may be abnormal and there may be abnormally high levels of platelets in the blood or too few red blood cells in the blood, none of these findings is a reliable indicator of the disease. A slit-lamp examination is essential. Recent work has suggested that high-resolution MRI and antibodies to inner ear antigens may be helpful. Cogan syndrome can occur in children, and is particularly difficult to recognize in that situation.

== Treatment ==
For more severe disease, oral corticosteroids may be necessary to reduce the inflammatory response. When large amounts of steroids are required or if the disease is severe and is not responding to steroid therapy, other immunosuppressive medications often are recommended. These immunosuppressive drugs include methotrexate, cyclophosphamide, cyclosporine or azathioprine. In some cases, combinations of these medicines are prescribed. Occasionally, if the disease has damaged blood vessels in the ear, cochlear implantation may be used to restore some sense of hearing.

Cinnarizine is mainly used to treat nausea and vomiting associated with motion sickness, vertigo, Ménière's disease, or Cogan syndrome. Studies have shown it to produce significant improvement in hearing loss in some patients.

== History ==
In 1945, the ophthalmologist David Glendenning Cogan (1908–1993) first described the "nonsyphilitic interstitial keratitis and vestibuloauditory symptoms" that would later bear his name. In 1963, the atypical form of Cogan syndrome, also known as "Logan Syndrome", was first described.
