= Gonin Medal =

International ophthalmologist award

The Gonin Medal is an international award given to one ophthalmologist every four years by the International Council of Ophthalmology. The award is named in honor of Swiss ophthalmologist Jules Gonin. It has been said to represent "the highest achievement in ophthalmology."

== Recipients ==
Source: Retina Research Foundation

- 2022 Stanley Chang
- 2018: Jean-Jacques De Laey
- 2014: Alice McPherson
- 2010: Alan C. Bird
- 2006: Alfred Sommer
- 2002: Gottfried Naumann
- 1998: Robert Machemer
- 1994: Harold L. Ridley
- 1990: Barrie R. Jones
- 1986: Akira Nakajima
- 1982: Alfred Edward Maumenee
- 1978: Norman Henry Ashton
- 1974: David G. Cogan
- 1970: Gerhard Meyer-Schwickerath
- 1966: Jules François
- 1962: Hans Goldmann
- 1958: Alan Woods
- 1954: Stewart Duke-Elder
- 1950: Hermenegildo Arruga
- 1945: Paul Bailliart
- 1941: Alfred Vogt

== See also ==
- List of medicine awards
- Garland W. Clay Award: an ophthalmology award given by the American Academy of Optometry
