= Community ophthalmology =

Community ophthalmology was described as a new discipline in medicine promoting eye health and blindness prevention through programs utilizing methodologies of public health, community medicine, and ophthalmology in 1978. This new discipline was first proposed by Dr. Patricia E. Bath in 1978 after observations of epidemics rates of preventable blindness among under-served populations in urban areas in the US as well as under-served populations in so called third-world countries .

The failure of hospital-based eye care to provide preventive services for at-risk populations as evidenced by the high rates of blindness due to preventable causes. Moreover, government institutional-based public health facilities were not equipped to prevent or treat the at-risk populations because the system-wide infrastructure lacked personnel capable of delivery of services for eye health education and eye health care.

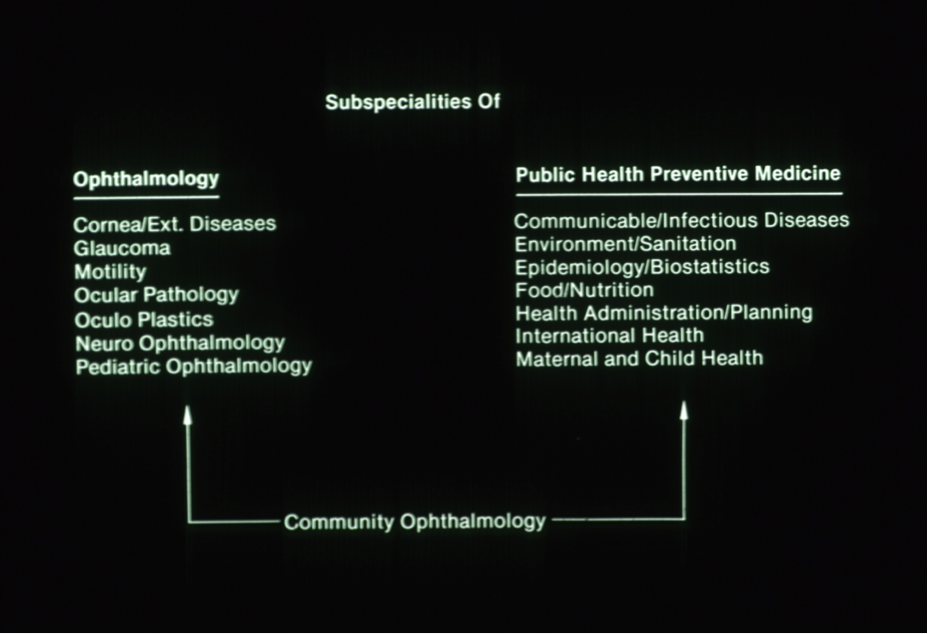
Subspecialities of ophthalmology

Historically, public health departments had staff of physicians, epidemiologists, biostatisticians, environmentalists and perhaps ⁣⁣microbiologists.⁣⁣. The disciplines included in public health services were maternal and child health, nutrition, family planning, and sanitation and environment. Hospital and public health institutions viewed ophthalmology (i.e., eye care services) as tertiary health care to be delivered solely by ophthalmologists. The basic public health services included pediatricians, obstetricians, gynecologists, family practice physicians, and environment/sanitation specialists, as well as nurses and midwives, but no ophthalmic assistants.

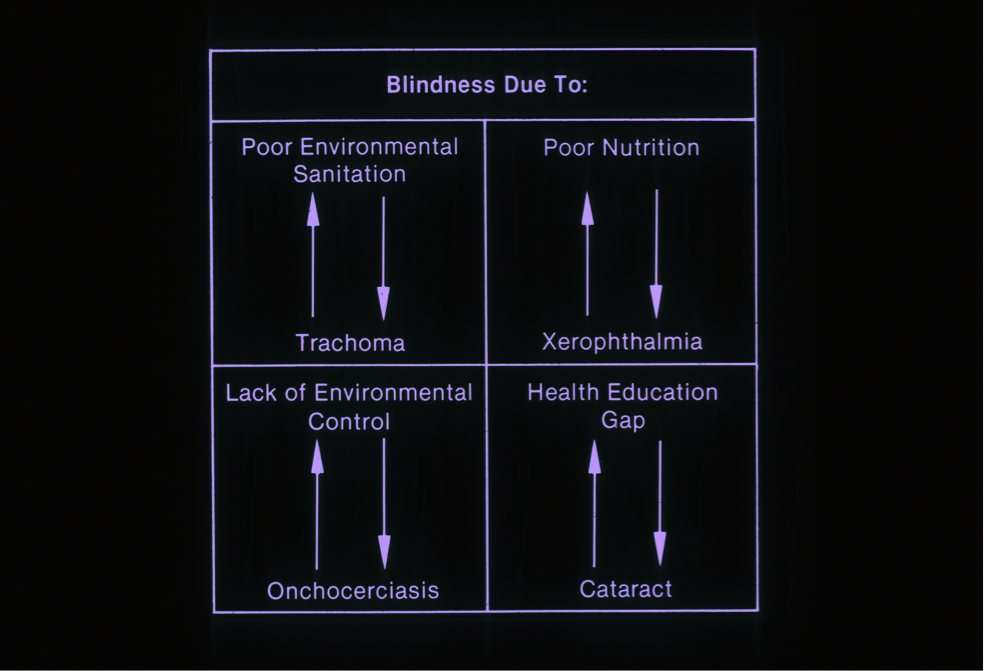
Blindness

In the discipline of community ophthalmology, the new cadre of personnel known as eye health care workers, eye health care educators, or ophthalmic assistants are trained to provide eye care and blindness prevention services at the village or door-to-door level.

For example, in villages with endemic ⁣⁣trachoma,⁣⁣ the eye care health workers would educate families about the importance of sanitation and handwashing and also provide access to eye drops. In areas with high rates of blindness due to cataracts, this cadre of personnel would educate families about the cure for blindness due to cataracts with eye surgery. Changing the belief that blindness is an inevitable consequence of aging requires community eye health education about curable blindness and preventable blindness, which is still so necessary in many parts of the world. Community ophthalmology teachings include the concept of primary eye care, which has been advocated as both a stand-alone health service and a new integral component of basic health services or public health services.

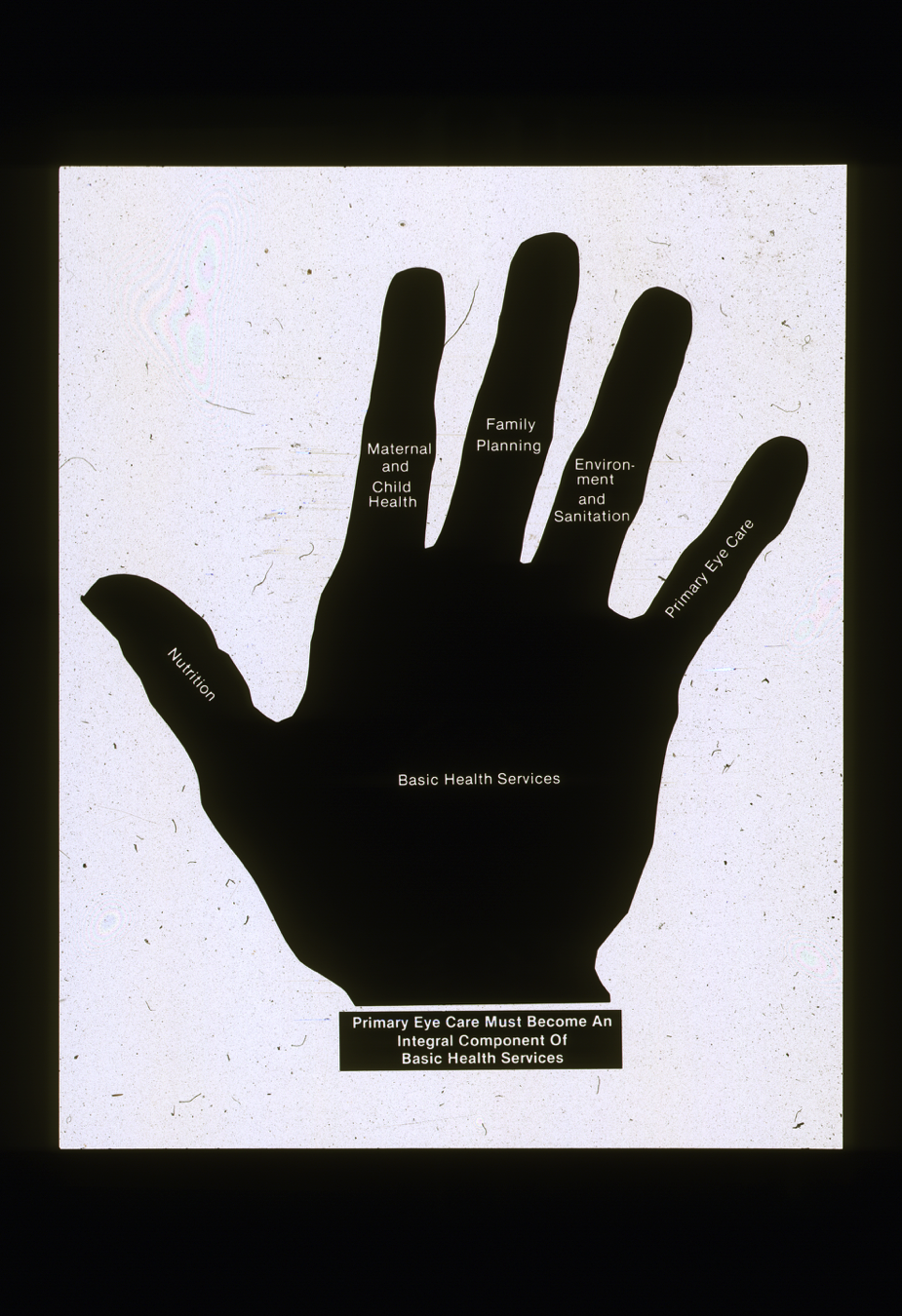
Basic health services

This new concept has been shown to be a sight-saving blindness prevention strategy. Since its inception in 1978, programs of community ophthalmology have been developed worldwide. The promulgation of programs of community ophthalmology can be traced through programs of [5], GOs like [6], and through the efforts of individuals such as Professor Cornelius Odarquaye Quarcoopome in Africa and Professor Kirmani in Asia and Professor Bath worldwide.

In 2017 Dr. Bath's role in the founding of community ophthalmology was recognized by MMedscape one of the "14 Women Physicians who Changed the Course of American Medicine."

In 2021 the English National Health Service started a program to allow hospital ophthalmologists to access records, referrals, and diagnostic images from high street optometrists in England. This is intended to cut out test duplication and reduce unnecessary hospital appointments. [6]
