= Barrie R. Jones =

British-New Zealand ophthalmologist

- Born: 4 January 1921; Silverstream, New Zealand
- Died: 19 August 2009 (aged 88); Tauranga, New Zealand
- Education: Victoria University of Wellington; University of Otago
- Spouse: Pauline Jones

Barrie Russell Jones (4 January 1921, in Silverstream, New Zealand – 19 August 2009, in Tauranga, New Zealand) was a British-New Zealand ophthalmologist, ophthalmic surgeon, and pioneer of preventive ophthalmology.

== Biography ==
Jones studied physics and chemistry with B.Sc. from Victoria College in Wellington and then medicine with M.B., B.Chir. from the University of Otago in Dunedin, where he specialized in ophthalmology under Rowland Wilson. From 1951 Jones worked in London at the ophthalmology department of Moorfields Eye Hospital and at Moorfields' Institute of Ophthalmology under Stewart Duke-Elder. In 1963 he became a professor of clinical ophthalmology of the University of London at Moorfields' Institute of Ophthalmology, continuing in that professorial chair until 1981.

Jones was one of the world's leading experts on trachoma and made important contributions to its prevention and treatment. He pioneered microsurgery of the lacrimal drainage system and surgery of the eyelids (often deformed by trachoma).

From 1965 to 1977 Jones carried out fieldwork in Iran on the isolation and culture of the causative organism, Chlamydia trachomatis, its transmission within impoverished communities, and its control. ... in 1981 he resigned his chair at London University to establish and lead the International Centre for Eye Health, a new department of preventive ophthalmology at the Institute. Its purpose was to apply the science of epidemiology and the principles of public health to eye health in the developing world, and to train a cadre of professionals who could bring services to the socially remote and the rural poor.

He was a prime mover in a large clinical trial in Nigeria that demonstrated the safely and efficacy of ivermectin in the prevention of blindness from onchocerciasis. He was the author or co-author of 23 books and hundreds of research publications on a wide range of subjects, including keratoconjunctivitis, pemphigoid, dry eye syndromes, and eye infections caused by bacteria, viruses, fungi, amebae, or various forms of parasites.

In 2002, Jones and his wife Pauline left the UK and returned to New Zealand. Upon his death at age 88, he was survived by his wife and four children.

== Selected publications ==
- with Chandler R. Dawson & M. L. Tarizzo: Guide to trachoma control in programmes for the prevention of blindness. 1981, ISBN 9241541571

== Awards and honours ==
- 1985 — CBE
- 1987 — King Faisal International Prize for Medicine
- 1990 — Gonin Medal
