= Alan C. Bird =

English ophthalmologist

Alan Charles Bird (born 4 July 1938, in Bromley, Kent, UK) is an English ophthalmologist, famous for his work on degenerative and hereditary diseases of the retina.

Bird was educated from 1949 to 1956 at Bromley Grammar School and from 1956 to 1961 at Guy's Hospital Medical School, where he studied neurology and neurosurgery and received his Bachelor of Medicine, Bachelor of Surgery. From July 1961 to January 1965 he held successive appointments at several hospitals in London. From January 1964 to December 1967 he served his ophthalmic residency at Moorfields Eye Hospital, then worked from December 1967 to June 1968 as senior registrar at the Royal London Hospital and the National Hospital for Nervous Diseases. From July 1968 to August 1969 he held a clinical fellowship in neuro-ophthalmology at Bascom Palmer Eye Institute, working with Lawton Smith, MD. Dr. Bird returned to Moorfield's in August 1969 and from 1969 to 1976 held successive appointed to the Institute of Ophthalmology as lecturer, senior lecturer and reader and then from 1976 to 2006 as professor, simultaneously serving as consultant at Moorfields Eye Hospital.

In order to contribute fully to research, Dr. Bird spent a sabbatical period with Dean Bok, MD, at UCLA in 1985. In addition to his work in London, he has also spent time in Africa undertaking research into river blindness. Most notable was the finding that retinal and optic nerve disease was the main cause of blindness, rather than corneal scarring, and that the standard treatment of diethyl carbamizine citrate caused rapid onset of blindness. This led to the institution of ivermectin as the preferred treatment, which has been highly successful. He has also worked in Jamaica recording the retinal changes in sickle cell disease over a 20-year period in a well-studied cohort generated by Graham Serjeant, MD.

Dr. Bird is the author or co-author of more than 400 publications in peer-reviewed journals. He has given numerous named lectures in Europe and North America.

He is married and the father of two children.

== Awards and honours ==
- 1981 — Duke-Elder Medal of the Ophthalmic Society of the United Kingdom
- 1981 — Prix Chauvin, la Société Française d'Ophtalmologie
- 1990 — Doyne Medal of the Oxford Ophthalmological Congress
- 1994 — Jackson Memorial Lectureship of the American Academy of Ophthalmology
- 1994 — Kayser Award of the International Congress of Eye Research
- 1997 — Donders Medal of the Netherlands Ophthalmological Society
- 1997 — Gass Medal of the Macular Society
- 1998 — Jules François Medal of the International Council of Ophthalmology
- 2002 — Bowman Medal of the Royal College of Ophthalmology
- 2004 — Helen Keller Prize of the Helen Keller Foundation
- 2004 — Alcon Research Award
- 2008 — Laureate Recognition Award of the American Academy of Ophthalmology
- 2010 — Gonin Medal of the International Council of Ophthalmology
- 2026 — Graefe Medal of the German Ophthalmological Society (DOG)
