= A. Edward Maumenee =

American ophthalmologist (1913–1998)

Maumenee after an eye operation at the Wilmer Eye Institute, circa 1989

Alfred Edward Maumenee Jr. (September 19, 1913 in Mobile, Alabama – January 18, 1998 in Point Clear, Alabama) was an American ophthalmologist who pioneered treatments for retinal diseases, macular degeneration and glaucoma and was a leading surgeon for corneal transplants and cataracts.

Maumenee received his A.B from the University of Alabama and his M.D. from Cornell Medical College in 1938. He studied at Johns Hopkins's Wilmer Eye Institute under Alan C. Woods and was a resident in ophthalmology from 1942 to 1943. After a tour of duty in the U. S. Navy from 1943 to 1945, he returned to Johns Hopkins as an associate professor. In 1948 he left the Wilmer Eye Institute to head the division of ophthalmology at Stanford Medical School and remained there until 1955 when he returned to the Wilmer Eye Institute as its director. He continued as the institute's director until his retirement in 1979. In 1968 he was one of the founders of the National Eye Institute.

An 8-story building and an endowed professorship are named for him at the Wilmer Institute, and he received many awards for his achievements in research, writing and teaching.

These achievements include the following: initial description of the immunological nature of corneal graft rejection; discovery of new diseases, such as congenital corneal dystrophies; and enhanced methods of surgery for cataract, corneal transplantation, glaucoma filtration, strabismus, congenital glaucoma, congenital cataract, postoperative hypotonia, epithelial invasion of the anterior chamber, and numerous others. Moreover, he was the first to describe and popularize the use of fluorescein angiography and clearly delineated the major types of macular degeneration well before anyone else considered this an important group of diseases. The number of his articles on these and other subjects exceeds 350 ...

== Awards and honors ==
- 1969 — Howe Medal of the American Ophthalmological Society
- 1972 — Francis I. Proctor Research Medal of the Association for Research in Vision and Ophthalmology
- 1982 — Gonin Medal of the International Council of Ophthalmology
- 1985 — Pisart Vision Award of Lighthouse International
- 1986 — International Duke-Elder Medal of the International Council of Ophthalmology
