= Frédéric Recordon =

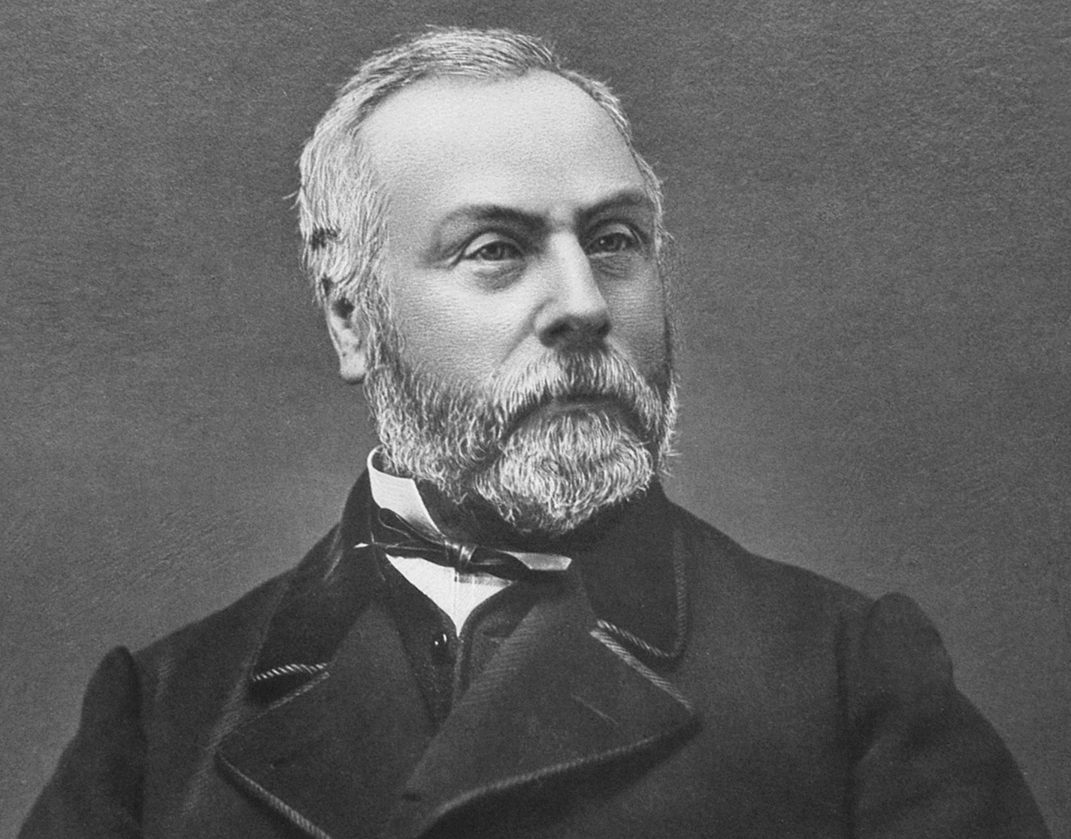
- in 1859

Frédéric Recordon (8 April 1811, in Rances – 26 November 1889, in Écublens) was a Swiss medical doctor and ophthalmologist.

== Life ==
He studied medicine at the University of Heidelberg as a pupil of Maximilian Joseph von Chelius, then continued his education in Paris, where he attended lectures given by Frédéric Jules Sichel. In 1837 he settled in Lausanne and opened an out-patient clinic for eye patients. In 1843, with Elisabeth Jeanne de Cerjat and William Haldimand, he founded the Asile des Aveugles (Asylum for the Blind) in Lausanne, where he worked as chief physician from 1844 to 1880. In the meantime, he taught classes in forensic medicine (from 1862) and hygiene (from 1869) at the Academy of Lausanne.

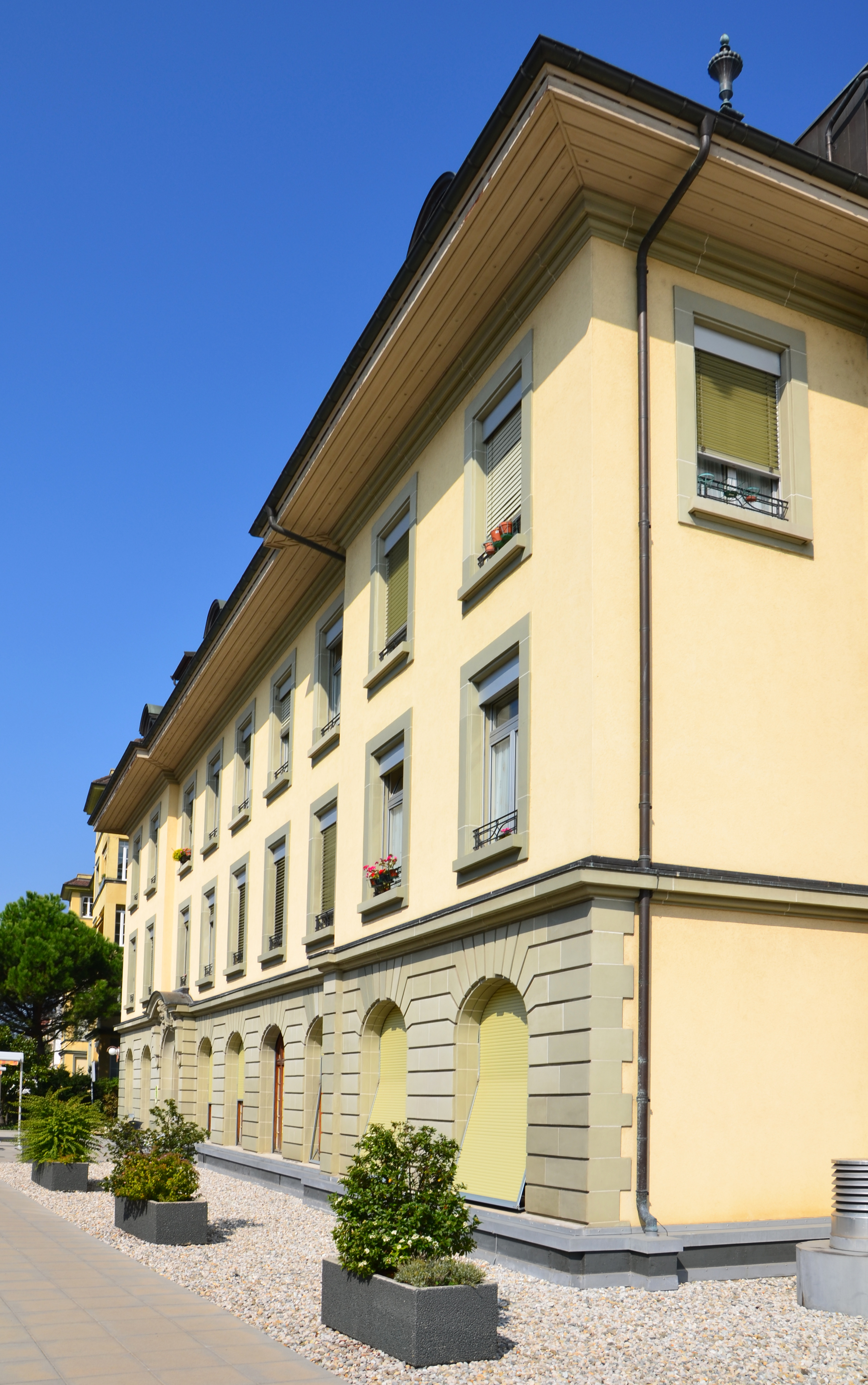
The "Home Recordon" for visually impaired elderly persons, part of the Asile des Aveugles in Lausanne.

From 1857 to 1884 he served as head of health services for the canton of Vaud. He was a catalyst towards the establishment of a school of pharmacy (1873), the Cery mental hospital (1873) and the new cantonal hospital at Champ-de-l'Air (1883).

In 1890 a biography was published by his former assistant, Marc Dufour, with the title Le docteur F. Recordon: 1811-1889 in the journal Revue médicale de la Suisse Romande. The thoroughfare "Avenue Frédéric Recordon" in Lausanne commemorates his name.
