= David Glendenning Cogan =

American physician

David Glendenning Cogan (14 February 1908, in Fall River, Massachusetts – 9 September 1993, in Wayne, Michigan) was an American ophthalmologist.

== Biography ==
Cogan studied at Dartmouth College as an undergraduate from 1925 to 1928, and at Dartmouth Medical School from 1928 to 1930. He received his bachelor's degree from Dartmouth College in 1929. He enrolled at Harvard Medical School in 1930 and received his medical degree there in 1932.

He spent a year at the University of Chicago Clinics as an intern, then served a two-year residency at the Massachusetts Eye and Ear Infirmary in Boston. He spent 1937 in medical study in Switzerland, Germany and Holland on Harvard's Moseley Travelling Fellowship.

Cogan was from 1940 to 1943 the acting director of, and from 1943 to 1973 the director of, Harvard Medical School's Howe Laboratory of Ophthalmology. From 1962 to 1968 he was the chair of Harvard Medical School's ophthalmology department. From 1974 to 1985 he was the chief of neuro-ophthalmology at the NIH's National Eye Institute.

His 1948 text Neurology of the Ocular Muscles and his 1966 text Neurology of the Visual System were major contributions to neuro-ophthalmology.

Cogan was part of the Atomic Bomb Casualty Commission that reported on radiation-induced cataracts suffered by survivors of the atomic bomb dropped on Hiroshima.

Upon his death he was survived by his wife, Frances Capps Cogan (a medical doctor who did research on ophthalmology), two daughters, and four granddaughters.

== Awards and honors ==
- 1944 — Warren Prize
- 1954 — Proctor Award
- 1968 — Mackenzie Medal
- 1969 — Research to Prevent Blindness Award
- 1974 — Gonin Medal
- 1988 — Cogan Award established by the Association for Research in Vision and Ophthalmology

== See also ==
- Cogan syndrome
- Iridocorneal endothelial syndrome
- Oculomotor apraxia
