= Jules François =

Belgian ophthalmologist

Émile Jules Marie Joseph François (24 May 1907, in Gingelom – 13 August 1984, in Zermatt) was a Belgian ophthalmologist.

== Biography ==
François received his medical degree at the Catholic University of Louvain in 1930 and specialized in ophthalmology and ophthalmic surgery. He went into private practice in ophthalmology in Charleroi. He remained active there as a scientific researcher and in 1942 became a professor at Ghent University and the director of Ghent University's eye clinic.

François and his collaborators did important research on the anatomy of the central retinal artery and the central optic nerve artery. With Guy Verriest and Alfred De Rouck, Jules François did pioneering work in electrooculography. Early in his career he studied general ophthalmology, glaucoma, conjunctivitis, fever therapy, cataract and biochemistry. In the later part of his career he focused mainly on genetic studies, but retained his interest in general ophthalmology and surgery for eye diseases arising from diabetes.

François was the author or co-author of about 1,870 peer-reviewed articles and thirty-four books or book chapters in scientific texts. Some were standard works, such as L’hérédité en ophtalmologie, Les cataractes congénitales and (as co-author with Adolphe Franceschetti and Jean Babel) Les hérédo-degénéréscences choriorétiniennes. He also an editorial board member of more than 30 medical journals. His reputation attracted eye specialists from more than 30 countries to do their training at Ghent University.

He was the president and honorary president of International Council of Ophthalmology, the European Ophthalmological Society, and the Academia Ophthalmologica Internationalis and was elected a member of several national academies. He was made an honorary doctor in about twenty universities and was a guest of honor at over eighty national and international meetings.

In 1983 he was included in the Belgian hereditary nobility with the title of baron. He chose as his motto Ex oculo lux.

He married and was the father of a daughter.

== Awards and honors ==
- Gonin Medal (1966)
- Donders Medal
- Waardenburg Medal
- Graefe Medal (1975)
- Chibret Medal
- Duke-Elder Medal
- Ophthamalogy Hall of Fame (2005)
- Jules François Foundation (established to maintain the Jules François Library)
- Prix Jules François (awarded every 4 years to recognize achievement by an ophthalmologist under the age of 40)

== Eponyms ==
- Central cloudy dystrophy of François (See also corneal dystrophy.)
- François-Neetens dystrophy
- Fraser-François syndrome
- Hallermann–Streiff–François syndrome

== Sources ==
- J. E. WINKELMAN, Award of the Donders Medal to Prof. J. François, in: Ophthalmologica, 1975.
- Professor Jules François, in: Journal of Neurological Sciences, Amsterdam, 1984.
- In Memoriam Baron Professor Jules François, in: British Journal of Ophthalmology, 1985.
- W. JAEGER, Numismatic history of the von Graefe Medal of the German Ophthalmological Society, in: Klin Oczna, 1988.
