= Gullapalli Nageswara Rao =

Indian ophthalmologist

- Born: Chodavaram, Krishna district, Andhra Pradesh, India
- Occupation: Ophthalmologist
- Medical career
- Institutions: L V Prasad Eye Institute
- Awards: Padma Shri; American Academy of Ophthalmology Honor Award; International Blindness Prevention Award; AEBA Award; 2017 Ophthalmology Hall of Fame

Gullapalli Nageswara Rao is an Indian ophthalmologist, the chairman of the Academia Ophthalmologica Internationalis (AOI) and the founder of the L. V. Prasad Eye Institute, Hyderabad. A former associate professor at the School of Medicine and Dentistry of the University of Rochester, Rao is a Fellow of the National Academy of Medical Sciences, India. He was honoured by the Government of India, in 2002, with the fourth highest Indian civilian award of Padma Shri. He was elected in 2017 to the Ophthalmology Hall of Fame instituted by the American Society of Cataract and Refractive Surgery.

== Personal life ==
At the age of three he was sent to his maternal uncle living in Edupagallu village near to Vijayawada. He studied there until his class 8 at a Telugu school. Following his father, who lived in Chennai near famous ophthalmologist Govindappa Venkataswamy (the founder of Aravind Eye Hospital) Rao decided to become an Ophthalmologist.

== Education and career ==
After completing his MBBS at Guntur Medical College in Guntur, Andhra Pradesh, Rao completed his postgraduate residency training in ophthalmology at the All India Institute of Medical Sciences, New Delhi. He has received the degree of Doctor of Science (Honoris Causa) from the University of Melbourne, the Honor Award of the American Academy of Ophthalmology, International Blindness Prevention Award from the American Academy of Ophthalmology and the AEBA Award from the Association of Eye Bank of Asia. Rao has served the International Agency for the Prevention of Blindness as a board member, the secretary general (1998) and the president (2004) on various occasions. Apart from training abroad, he is also serving as visiting professor at several universities in the United States, Europe, Australia and Asia. As of 2020, Rao has published more than 300 papers in peer reviewed national and international journals and has served on the editorial boards of several journals. He has five honorary doctorates from Australia, United Kingdom and India.

== Awards and honours ==
- 2012: Padma Shree
- 2017: Included in the Ophthalmology Hall of Fame at the meeting of American Society of Cataract and Refractive Surgery (ASCRS), Los Angeles.
- Vision Excellence Award- The International Agency for the Prevention of Blindness (IAPB)
- World Cornea Congress Medal from International Cornea Society for outstanding contribution to the field of cornea
- Invited Editorial for the 100th year issue of British Journal of Ophthalmology
- He was honoured with the institution of ‘Gullapalli N Rao – AIOS Endowment Lecture’ by the All India Ophthalmological Society
- 1983: Honor Award of American Academy of Ophthalmology
- 1996: Fellowship of the National Academy of Medical Sciences, India
- 2006: International Blindness Prevention Award, by the Board of Trustees of the American Academy of Ophthalmology
