= L. V. Prasad Eye Institute =

Private Hospital in India

L V Prasad Eye Institute

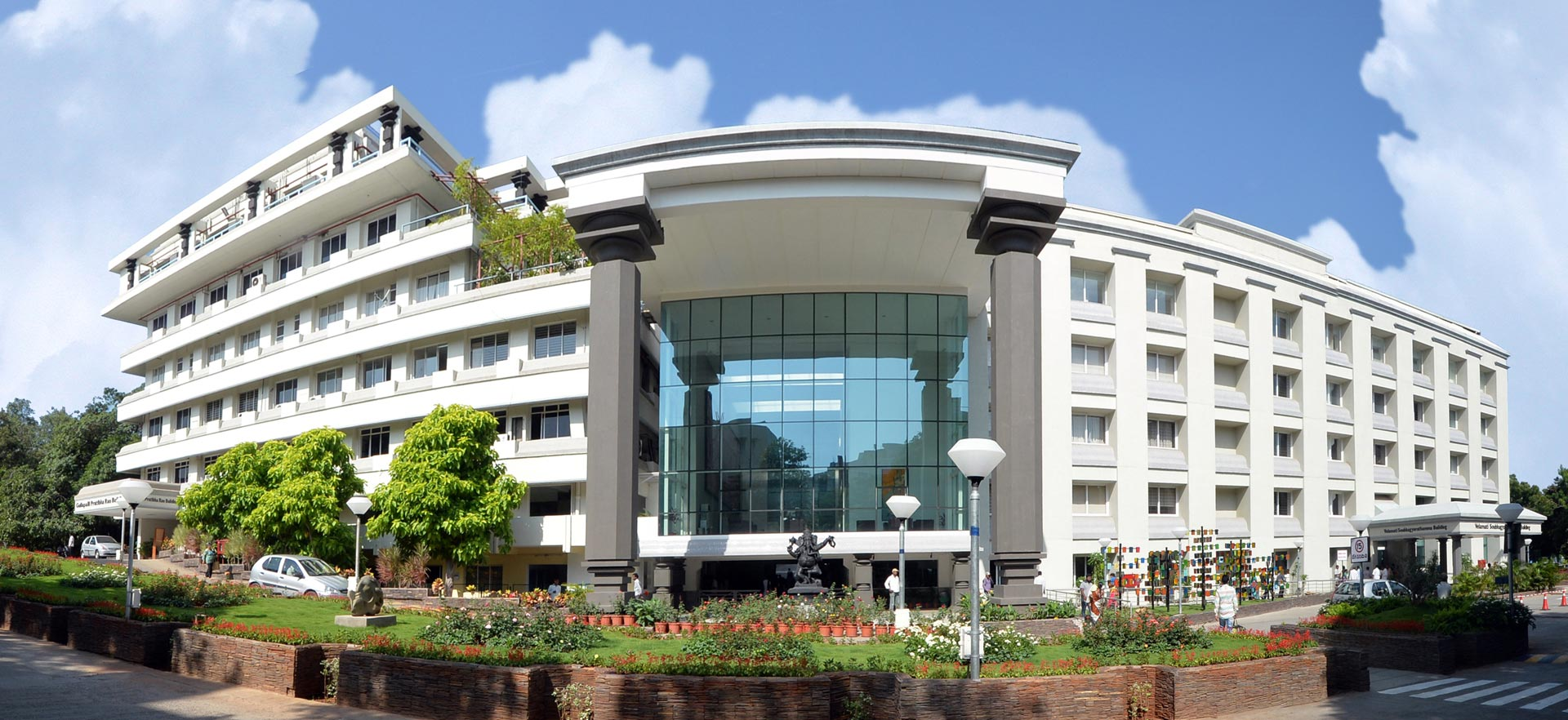
- LVPEI Hyderabad

Geography
- Location: L V Prasad Marg, Banjara Hills, Hyderabad, Telangana, India
- Coordinates: 17.424643°N 78.427513°E

Organisation
- Type: Specialist; Ophthalmology

History
- Founded: 1987

Links
- Website: http://www.lvpei.org
- Lists: Hospitals in India

The L V Prasad Eye Institute (LVPEI) is an eye-care network, established by Dr. Gullapalli Nageswara Rao, an ophthalmologist, at Hyderabad, in 1986. It is a non-profit, multi-campus, non-governmental institution. With more than 275 eye-care centres in India, it is the largest eye-care network in the world.

LVPEI is a World Health Organization (WHO) collaborating centre, and an affiliate hospital of Harvard Medical School. It is the first eye hospital to be accredited by the National Accreditation Board for Hospitals & Healthcare Providers (NABH).

== Establishment ==
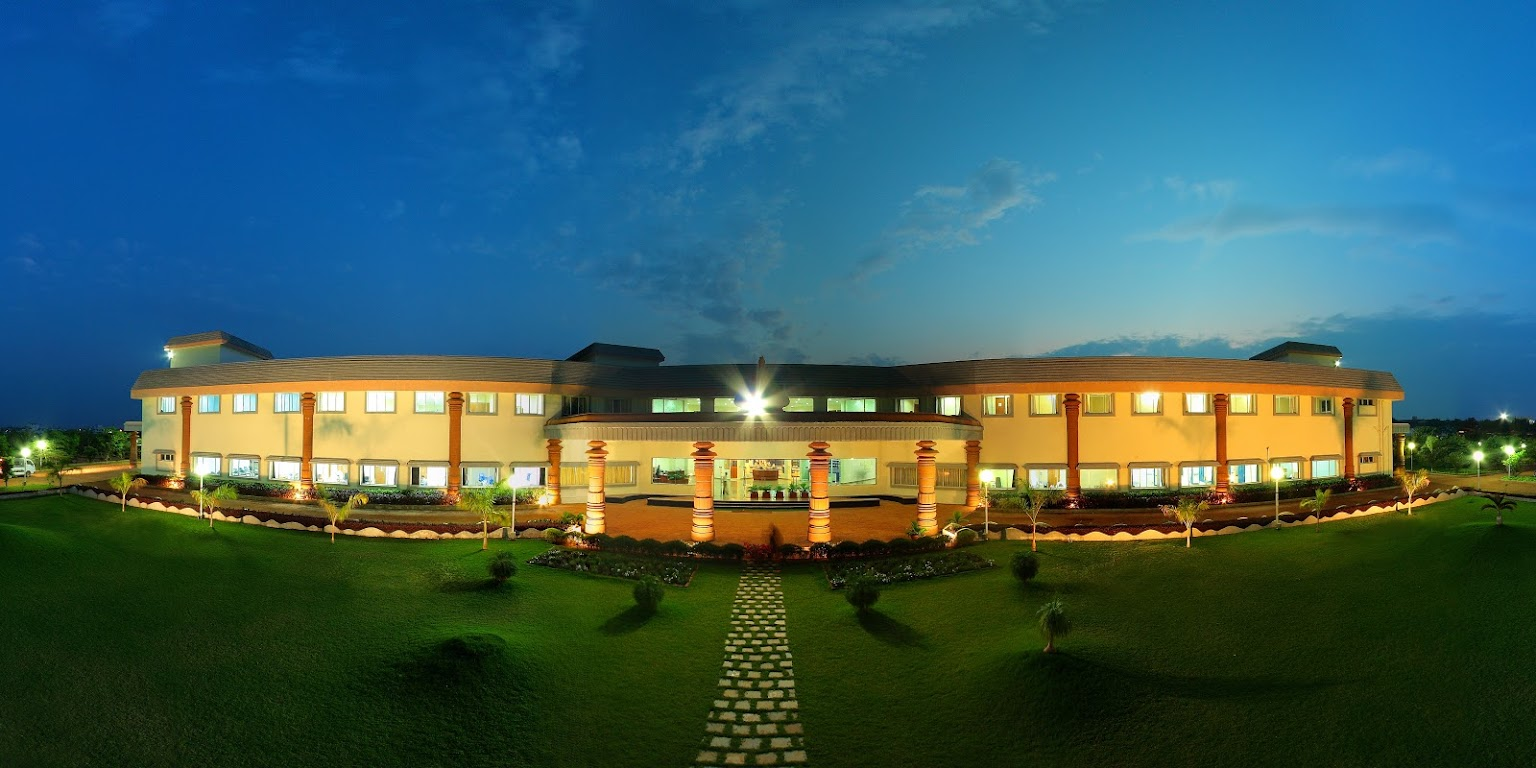
LVPEI Bhubaneswar

Established in 1986, the L V Prasad Eye Institute (LVPEI), a World Health Organization Collaborating Centre for the Prevention of Blindness, is a comprehensive eye health facility. The institute operates through ten active arms: Clinical Services, Education, Research, Vision Rehabilitation, Rural and Community Eye Health, Eye Banking, Advocacy and Policy Planning, Capacity Building, Innovation, and Product Development. LVPEI is managed by two not-for-profit entities: the Hyderabad Eye Institute (HEI) and the Hyderabad Eye Research Foundation (HERF).

Before the institute was established, the renowned Indian filmmaker Sri Akkineni Lakshmi Vara Prasad Rao, popularly known as L V Prasad, decided to invest a portion of the profits from his blockbuster film Ek Duuje Ke Liye towards a noble cause. He donated one crore rupees and five acres of land in order to establish the state-of-the-art eye institute. In recognition of this generous gesture, the institute's board named the facility in his honor.

Over the years, his family has continued to support the institute's work. His son, Mr Ramesh Prasad, managing director of Prasad Film Laboratories, is a founder trustee of LVPEI and is the longest serving member of the Hyderabad Eye Institute's governing board, along with Dr Rao. It has maintained its tradition of naming its centres and facilities after its benefactors. Among its notable benefactors and donors are several corporate such as Infosys, Microsoft, State Bank of India, Standard Chartered, ICICI, Aditya Birla Group, Dalmia Group, Bajaj Group, Sun Pharma, Natco Pharma, NALCO.

== Active areas of operation ==
=== Clinical Services ===
LVPEI has served nearly 34.14 million (3.4 crore) people, with over 50% of them entirely free of cost, irrespective of the complexity of care needed, done over 1.93 million surgeries, trained over 55,000 ophthalmologists and optometrists. The institute offers rehabilitation services for persons with visually impairment, and in 2018 it inaugurated a 'Special Needs Vision Clinic' to provide eye care to children with developmental delays and disabilities.

=== Education and Research ===
Scientists from L V Prasad Eye Institute are listed amongst the world's top 2% by Stanford University. It is an affiliate hospital of Harvard Medical School.It has academic and research linkages with Massachusetts Institute of Technology, BITS Pilani, IIM Ahmedabad, IIT Hyderabad, University of Hyderabad, GITAM, University of Sheffield, University of Bradford.

=== Centers ===
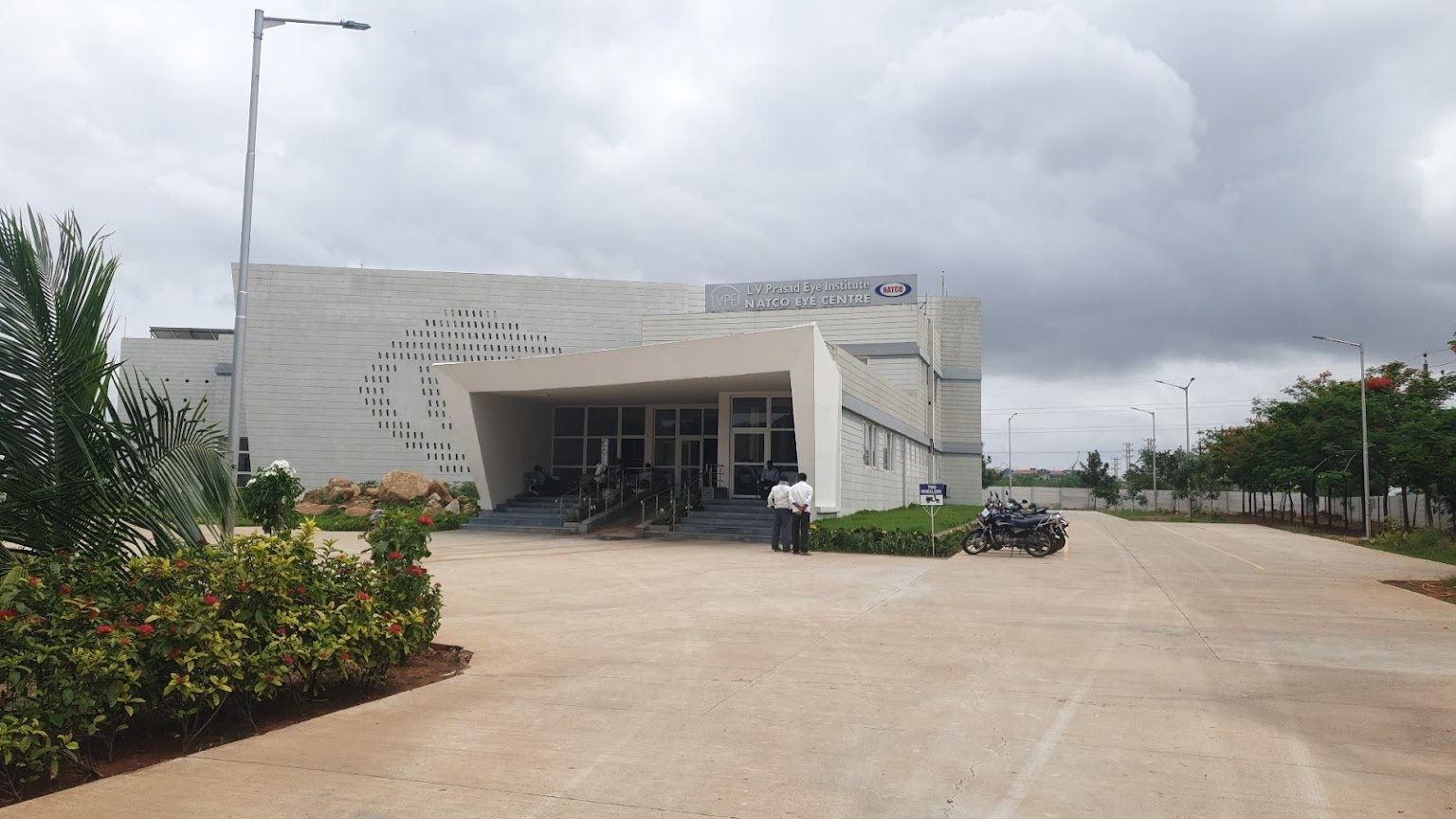
LVPEI NATCO Kothur

LVPEI network has 275 eye-care centres across the states of Karnataka, Odisha, Telangana and Andhra Pradesh:

- Main center in Banjara Hills, named after Kallam Anji Reddy the founder of Dr.Reddy Labs.
- 3 tertiary centers in Visakhapatnam, Bhubaneswar and Vijayawada.
- 26 secondary centers
- 245 primary care centers

The secondary and primary care centers provide medical facilities to the remotest rural areas of the country.

=== Eye bank ===
As of 2020, LVPEI Eye Bank Network has been performing over 2,000 corneal transplant surgeries every year. As of February 2023, total corneas collected were 1,19,279 and over 69,964 corneal transplant surgeries have been performed at the institute, which may be the highest at a single institute anywhere in the world.

The RIEB set up the Hyderabad Cornea Preservation Medium Centre which uses a McKarey Kauffman (MK) Medium.

== Awards ==
- Greenberg Prize – End Blindness 2020
- Sarojini Triloknath National Award 2020

== See also ==
- Genome Valley
