= Akira Nakajima =

Japanese ophthalmologist

- 中島 章
- Born: 14 July 1923; Kumamoto Prefecture, Japan
- Died: 2017 (aged 93–94); Japan
- Occupations: Physician and professor of ophthalmology

Akira Nakajima (中島 章, Nakajima Akira; 14 July 1923 – 2017) was a Japanese ophthalmologist.

At Tokyo University, Nakajima became a Doctor of Medicine in 1945 and a Doctor in Medical Science in 1953. From 1945 to 1949, he worked in the department of ophthalmology of University Hospital, University of Tokyo. From 1949 to 1954 he was the Akita Professor of the eye clinic at the Hanaoka Mine Hospital. At Juntendo University in Tokyo he worked in the ophthalmology department as an assistant professor from 1954 to 1960 and a full professor from 1960 to 1989, retiring there as professor emeritus in 1989.

Dr. Nakajima has done research on many topics in ophthalmology, including Behçet's disease, clinical investigations of lamellar keratoplasty, the epidemiology of age-related cataracts in Tibet, and experimental degeneration of the retina in mice. He is a member of the Academia Ophthalmologica Internationalis. He is also a member of the International Council of Ophthalmology (president 1990–1998 and honorary life president since 1998). He was the president of the Asia-Pacific Academy of Ophthalmology in 1972–1976.

He married in 1953 and was the father of two children.

== Awards and honors ==
- 1986 — Gonin Medal awarded at the University of Lausanne
- 1987 — José Rizal Medal awarded in Kuala Lumpur by the Asia-Pacific Academy of Ophthalmology
- 2000 — 3rd Order Middle Rising Sun awarded by the Japanese Emperor

== Selected publications ==
- Kenshi Satoh, Masayasu Bando, & Akira Nakajima. "Fluorescence in human lens." Experimental Eye Research 16.2 (1973): 167–172.
- Kanjiro Masuda, Akira Urayama, Mitsuko Kogure, Akira Nakajima, Kimihiro Nakae, & Goro Inaba. "Double-masked trial of cyclosporin versus colchicine and long-term open study of cyclosporin in Behçet's disease." The Lancet 333, no. 8647 (1989): 1093–1096.
- Tian-Sheng Hu, Q. U. Zhen, Robert D. Sperduto, Jia-Liang Zhao, Roy C. Milton, and Akira Nakajima. "Age-related cataract in the Tibet Eye Study." Archives of Ophthalmology 107, no. 5 (1989): 666–669. doi:10.1001/archopht.1989.01070010684027
- Akira Nakajima. "Epidemiology of visual impairment and blindness." Current Opinion in Ophthalmology 2, no. 6 (1991): 733–738.
- Yoshihiro Hotta, Keiko Fujiki, Mutsuko Hayakawa, Akira Nakajima, Atsushi Kanai, Yukihiko Mashima, Yoshiki Hiida, Kei Shinoda, Keiko Yamada, and Yoshihisa Oguchi. "Clinical features of Japanese Leber's hereditary optic neuropathy with 11778 mutation of mitochondrial DNA." Japanese Journal of Ophthalmology 39, no. 1 (1994): 96–108.
