= Danièle Aron-Rosa =

French ophthalmologist and painter

- Born: Danièle Sylvie Rosa; 1930 (age 95–96); Tunis, Tunisia
- Other name: Danièle S. Aron-Rosa
- Occupations: Ophthalmologist, inventor, and painter
- Years active: 1962–present

Danièle Aron-Rosa (born 1930) is a French ophthalmologist and physician-scientist most known for developing the picosecond, ophthalmic Nd:YAG laser for eye surgeries. She has been called one of the two most respected laser pioneers in ophthalmology, alongside Franz Fankhauser. She is also a painter, using the pseudonym Genskof or Aron Genskof, and has works in the permanent collections of museums in France and the United States.

== Early life and education ==
Danièle Sylvie Rosa was born in 1930 in Tunis, Tunisia, to Renée (née Valensi) and André Rosa, who were of Jewish heritage. She began her university studies in physics, but later switched to medicine. She graduated in 1962 with a medical degree from the University of Paris and completed her residency at the Assistance Publique – Hôpitaux de Paris. She became interested in ophthalmology during her rotation in the field during her residency, and completed her specialty with a fellowship from the hospital and University of Paris. She married Jean-Jacques Aron in 1958.

== Career ==
=== Ophthalmology and laser technology development ===
From 1962, Aron-Rosa headed the eye clinic at the Assistance Publique Hôpitaux, and in 1972, she became professor and chair of the ophthalmology department at Paris Diderot University. In 1974, she became chair of ophthalmology at Hospital Robert Debrè and Hospital Foundation Adolphe de Rothschild (Rothschild Eye Foundation) in Paris. She began her career studying tumors on the back of the eye. Working at the Rothschild Eye Foundation in Paris in the early 1970s, she began experiments in which she attempted to cut vitreous strands with a laser. Ruby lasers had recently come into use for eye surgery, but their extreme power and limited speed often damaged the eye. Sparked by her interest in physics, she began researching how the rate could be accelerated and the power lessened.

In 1973, a discussion with physicist Pierre Victor Auger led Aron-Rosa to the realization that pulsed YAG lasers had lower energy and higher power. Changing her research to focus on YAG lasers, she recognized the potential of ultra-rapid pulsing, after watching a scientific program on television in 1975, in which a single mitochondrion was destroyed without bursting the cell surrounding it. Working with Jean-Claude Griesemann, Aron-Rosa developed and patented the picosecond, ophthalmic Nd:YAG laser for eye surgeries in 1978. Using this type of laser, she was able to perform posterior capsulotomies.

Aron-Rosa introduced her technology in the United States in 1982, after having successfully operated on over 6,500 patients in France. The following year, she was honored as a Chevalier in the Legion of Honour. Aron-Rosa was recognized with the Innovator's Lecture in 1987 from the American Society of Cataract and Refractive Surgery and was inducted into their Hall of Fame in 2003. The following year she was named Academy Laureate of the American Academy of Ophthalmology. Aron-Rosa retired in 2010 to focus her energy on her painting. She is recognized along with Franz Fankhauser, as one of the two most respected laser pioneers for eye surgery.

=== Art ===
Aron-Rosa paints under the name Genskof or Aron Genskof. Many of her works focus on a religious theme, like those shown in 2010 at the Musée d'Art et d'Histoire du Judaïsme (Museum of Jewish Art and History) in Paris. One, Giocodell'oca del popolo ebraico, a large blue canvas with a menorah in the center contains boxes of people dreaming of the creation of the State of Israel. She has paintings in the permanent collections of museums in Les Sables-d'Olonne, Memphis, and Nashville.
