= International Council of Ophthalmology =

The International Council of Ophthalmology (ICO) is an international organisation that represents professional associations of ophthalmologists. It is headquartered in Geneva, Switzerland.

The Board of Trustees is the executive body and operational arm of the ICO.

== History ==
The ICO was established in 1857 in Brussels when 150 ophthalmologists from 24 countries met in the first International Congress of Ophthalmology. The Advisory Board (executive body) was created in 1927 in Scheveningen, Netherlands Member societies were added (International Federation of Ophthalmological Societies) in 1933 in Madrid, Spain.

Prior to July 2008, International Federation of Ophthalmological Societies (IFOS) was the official name of the organization, with the ICO serving as the executive body. Over time, "ICO" became better known than IFOS, leading to considerable confusion and a proposal to adopt a single name. The names for the separate parts of the group are now combined under one name, ICO.

As a founding member of the International Agency for the Prevention of Blindness (IAPB), the ICO participates in the IAPB's VISION 2020 initiative, supports and enables ICO member education programs and runs their own ICO initiatives sponsored by the ICO Foundation.

== Programs ==
- The World Ophthalmology Congress (WOC); The council presents the Gonin Medal every four years at the WOC.
- ICO International Basic Science Assessment and Clinical Sciences Assessment for Ophthalmologists
- ICO International Fellowships
- ICO International Clinical Guidelines
- International Standards For Vision, Eye Care and Ophthalmology
- Research Agenda for Global Blindness Prevention
- Vision for the Future, the International Ophthalmology Strategic Plan to Preserve and Restore Vision
- Advocacy for preservation of vision
- Ophthalmic education initiatives
