= Jules Gonin =

Swiss ophthalmologist and professor

- Born: 10 August 1870; Lausanne, Switzerland
- Died: May, 1935; Lausanne, Switzerland
- Scientific career
- Fields: Ophthalmology

Jules Gonin (10 August 1870 – May 1935) was a professor of ophthalmology in Lausanne who pioneered the procedure of ignipuncture, the first successful surgery for the treatment of retinal detachments.

== Early life ==
Jules grew in a family with culture and religious faith. During his schooling he showed talent in languages. He spoke French, Swiss German, Latin and Greek. He also studied English, Spanish and Italian languages.

He got enrolled in the College of Sciences in 1888 and studies medicine at the University of Lausanne. He earned distinction from university for his research studies on butterflies. He entered the institute of Pathology in Lausanne. He developed interest in Ophthalmology and was offered training by Dr. Marc Dufour, then director of the Eye Hospital in Lausanne in 1896.

== Nobel Prize ==
Gonin was nearly awarded the Nobel Prize in Physiology or Medicine for his innovations in retinal detachment surgery and according to some should have received it. He was seriously considered by the Nobel Committee in 1934. A questionnaire on Gonin's research was sent to ophthalmic authorities around the world, among which all replied favourably, with one only exception. This is believed to have come from an envious countryman, who persuaded the committee to postpone the award for one year. However, he died unexpectedly in the spring of 1935, before the next prize was awarded.

== Other honours ==
- The International Council of Ophthalmology established the eponymous Gonin Medal in 1941, which has been awarded quadrennially ever since.
- The Hôpital ophtalmique Jules-Gonin is named after him.
- The very street of Lausanne that he used to walk from his home to the hospital every day is now named after him.
