= Deutsches Museum Bonn =

Technology museum in Germany

Coordinates: 50°41′59″N 7°08′59″E

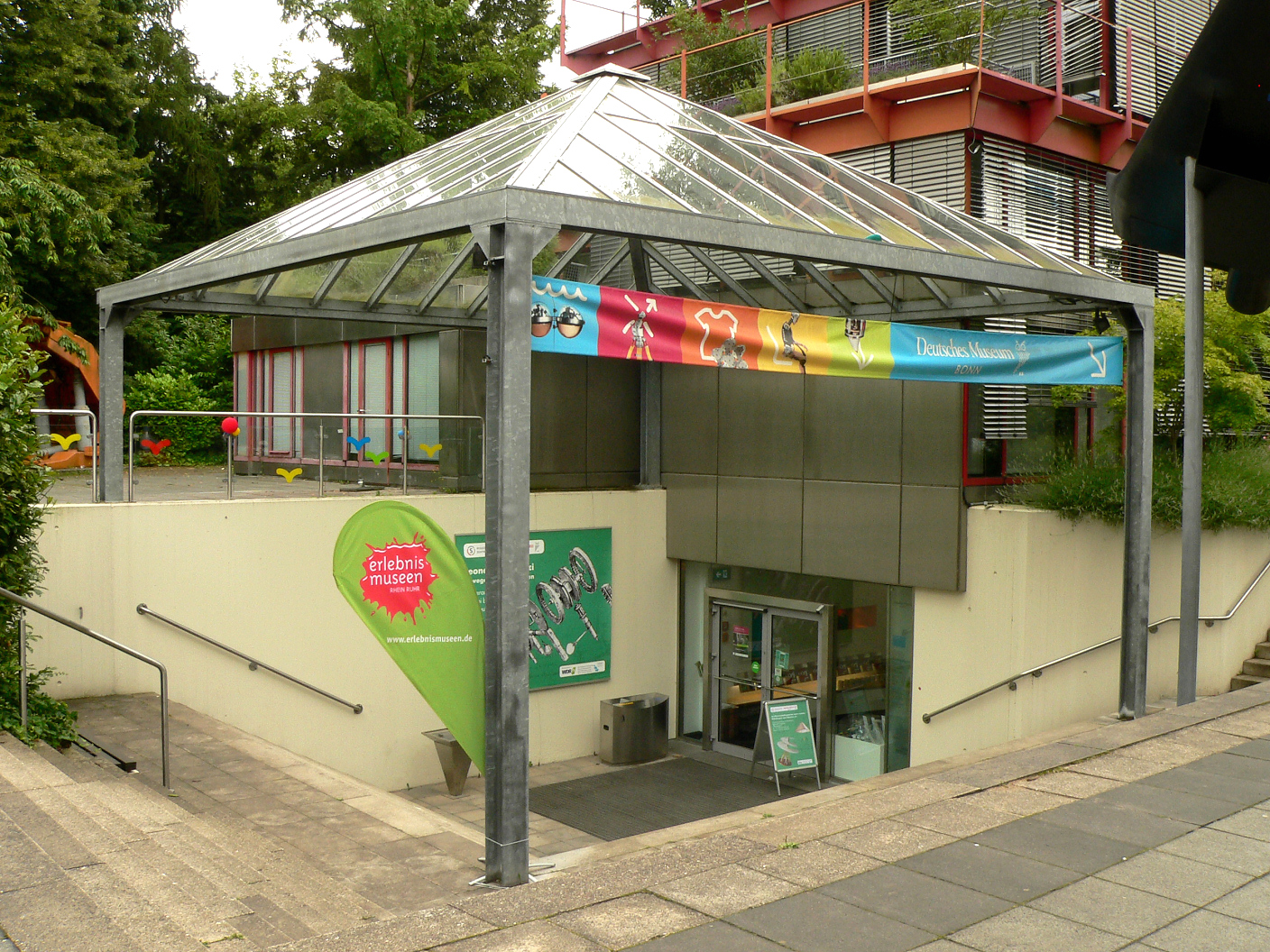
Entrance to the Deutsches Museum Bonn

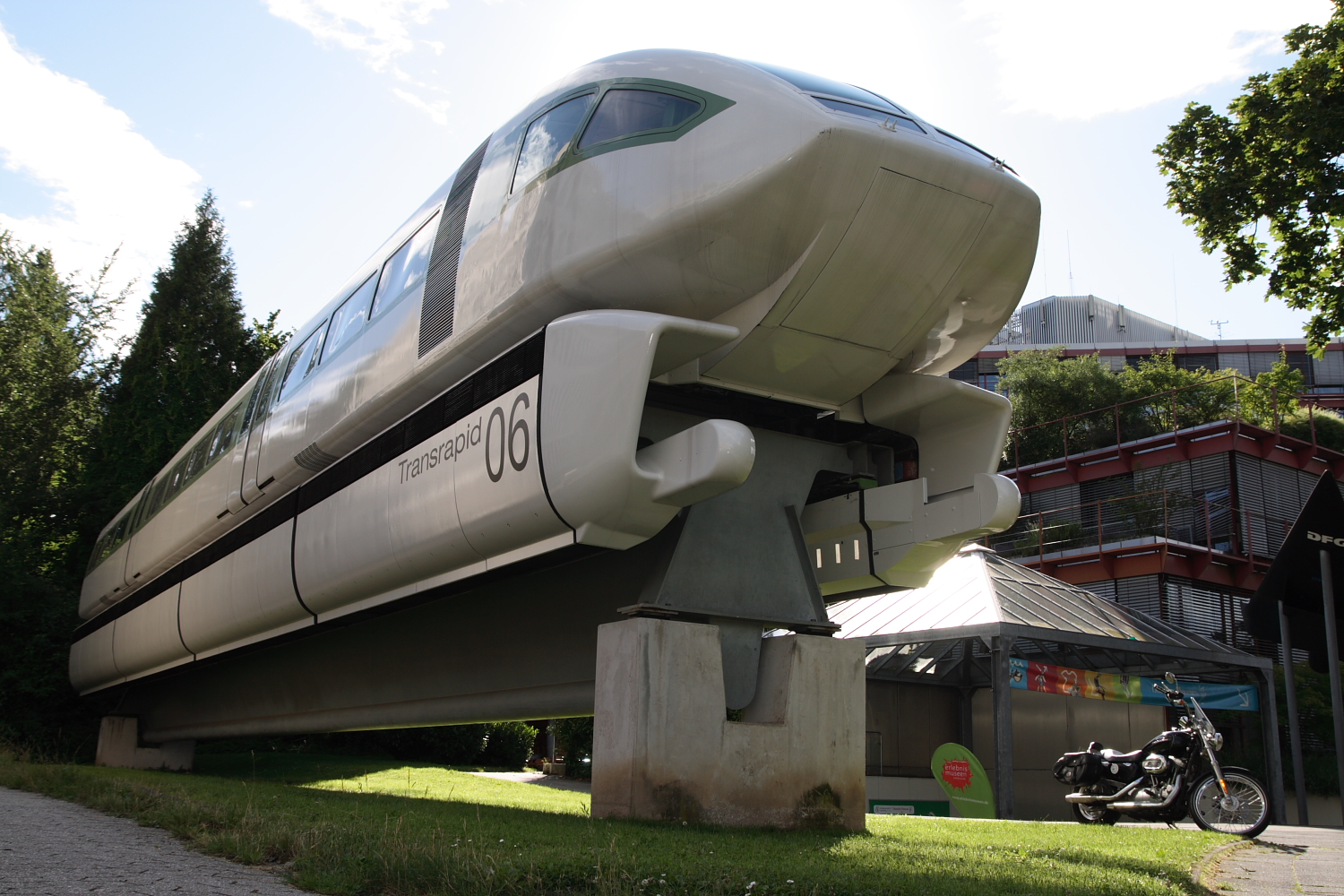
Deutsches Museum Bonn with the Transrapid 06

The Deutsches Museum Bonn is a museum with exhibits and experiments of famous scientists, engineers and inventors. Its central themes are research and technology in Germany after 1945.

It is part of the Deutsches Museum in Munich. It was founded in 1995 at the instigation of the Association of Sponsors for the Promotion of German Science (Stifterverband für die Deutsche Wissenschaft) in the Science Centre (Wissenschaftszentrum) in Bonn.

Museum director has been Andrea Niehaus since 2001.
