= List of boardwalks in the United States =

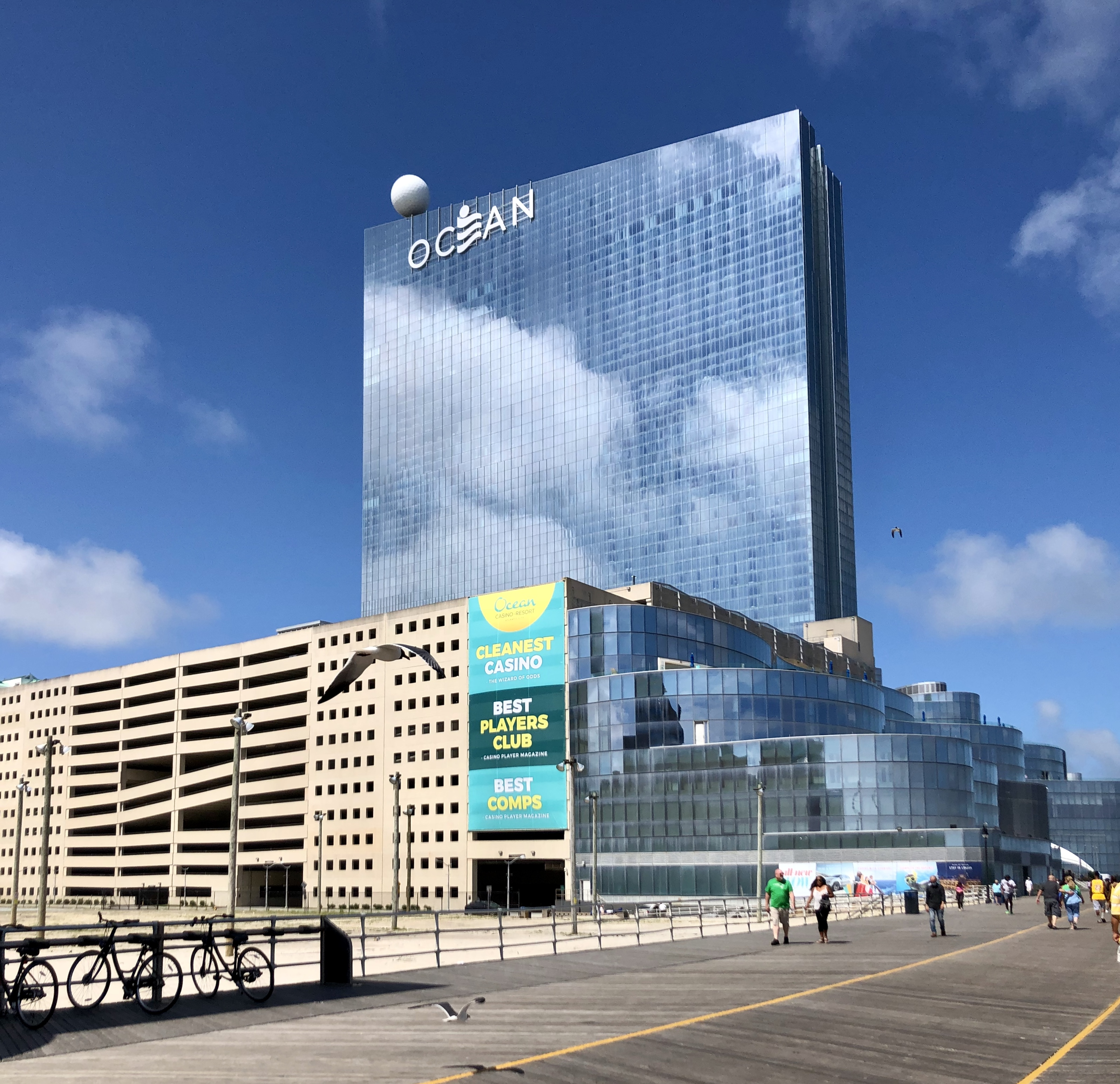
The boardwalk at Atlantic City, New Jersey

This is a list of boardwalks in the United States by state. Boardwalks can be found around the world, but they are especially common along the East Coast of the United States. One of the earliest and one of the busiest boardwalks was opened on June 26, 1870, in Atlantic City, New Jersey. Some pedestrian paths called "boardwalks" are made of concrete. Boardwalks border the beach's sand, and often contain many stores and attractions.

In addition to serving as recreational promenades, boardwalks can also help manage pedestrian access in environmentally sensitive coastal areas. Elevated or designated walkways can reduce trampling of dunes, wetlands, and native vegetation by concentrating foot traffic along a defined route. Modern boardwalks may also incorporate ramps, wider paths, viewing platforms, and other accessibility features to improve access for visitors with limited mobility.

== States ==
=== Alaska ===
In the Eskimo villages of the Yukon-Kuskokwim Delta, Alaska, 10-foot (3 m) wide heavy-duty boardwalks are common in villages throughout this part of Bush Alaska. Tuntutuliak was the first village to receive boardwalks in the mid-1990s. Its boardwalks were funded by a government program intended to determine whether building boardwalks would be a worthwhile investment elsewhere. Before these boardwalks existed, there was a much narrower, lower, and less extensive system of boards and boardwalks that served delta villages.

=== California ===
==== Newport Beach ====
Newport Beach's boardwalk is a concrete path running 2.9 miles (4.7 km) from 36th Street to between E and F streets on the Balboa Peninsula. It passes McFadden Square and Newport Pier, and Balboa Pier. The speed limit along the path is 8 miles per hour (13 km/h) in order to prevent conflicts among bicyclists, pedestrians, skateboarders and rollerbladers.

==== Santa Cruz ====
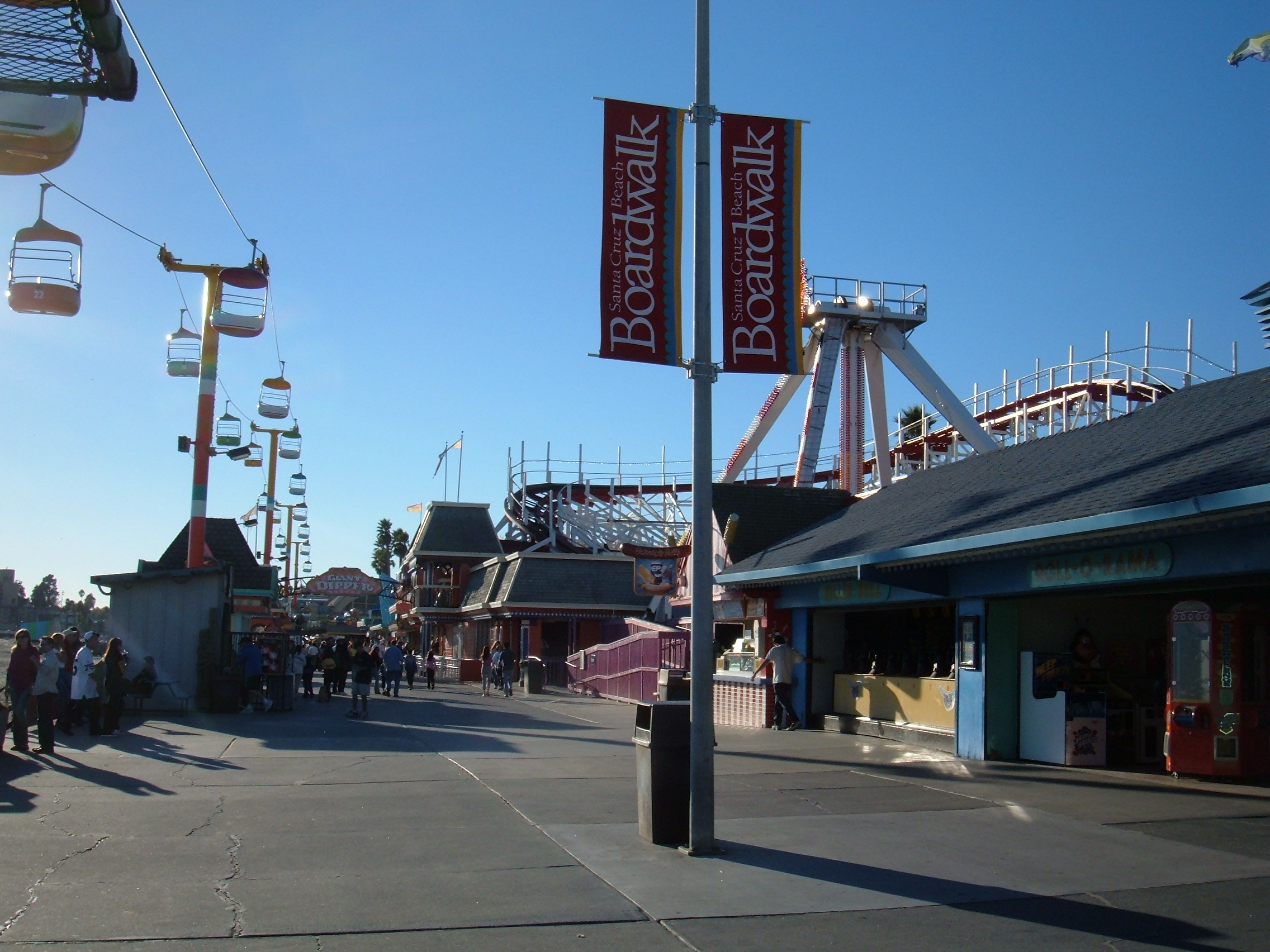
The Santa Cruz Beach Boardwalk

The Santa Cruz Beach Boardwalk, opened in 1907, is the oldest amusement park in California and the home to two national historic landmarks: the Looff Carousel and the Giant Dipper roller coaster. The Santa Cruz boardwalk no longer actually has any wooden boardwalks.

==== Venice Beach ====
This 1.5 mile boardwalk in the city of Los Angeles is one of the most well-known boardwalks and has a pedestrian walk, bike path, rollerskater and skateboard ramps, and restaurants and shops. Venice Beach is also famous for Muscle Beach, where bodybuilders work out. Former California governor and actor Arnold Schwarzenegger worked out on Muscle Beach during the 1980s.

=== Connecticut ===
==== Ocean Beach Park ====
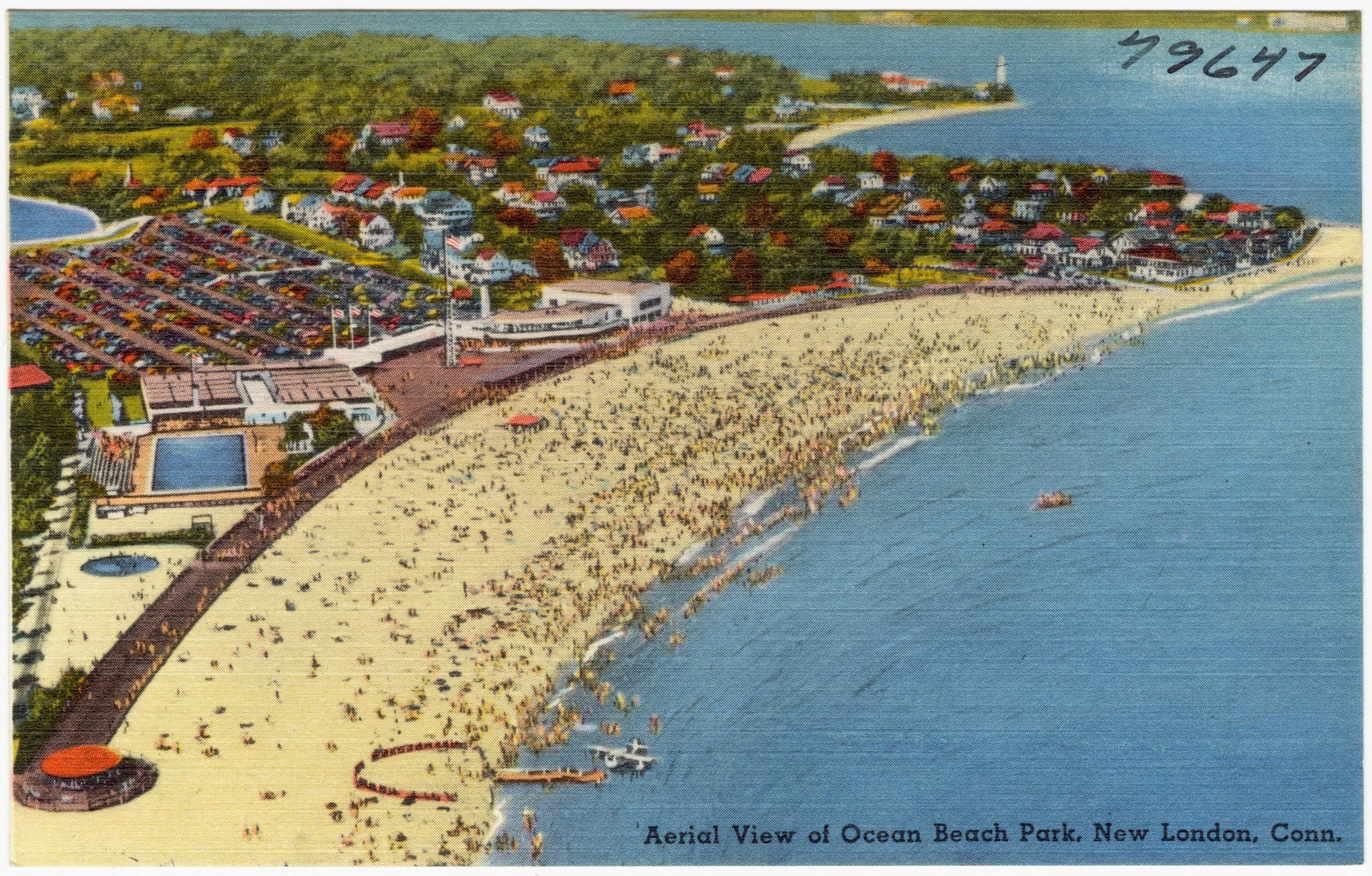
Early illustration of Ocean Beach Park's Boardwalk

On the southern coast of New London, Connecticut there is a boardwalk running roughly 1,620 feet (0.49 km) within Ocean Beach Park that is claimed to have "New England's Finest Sugar Sand Beach and Boardwalk Attractions".

=== Delaware ===
==== Bethany Beach ====
Bethany Beach's boardwalk, while not as long as Rehoboth Beach's, connects the summer seaside resort's broad, sandy beach to motels, restaurants, and vacation homes. In 2011, Bethany Beach banned smoking on the beach and boardwalk.

==== Rehoboth Beach ====
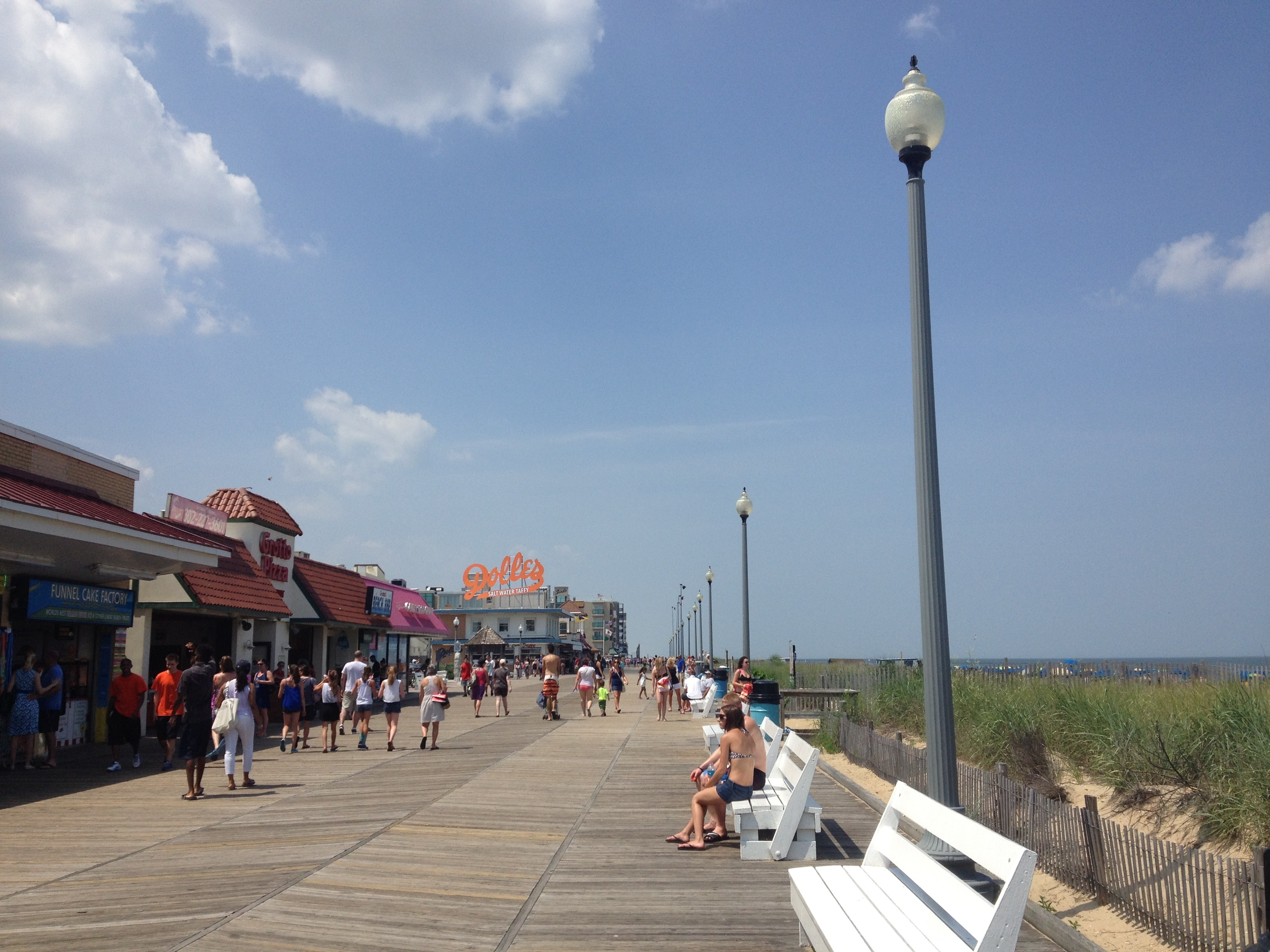
The Rehoboth Beach boardwalk in Delaware

Rehoboth Beach's 1-mile (1.6 km) long boardwalk connects summer tourists with Rehoboth Beach's main attractions during the summer months, including high-end resorts, numerous shops, arcades, eating establishments and family amusement center. The town's main street, Rehoboth Avenue, intersects with the boardwalk.

=== Florida ===
==== Bay Lake ====
At Walt Disney World Resort in Bay Lake, there is a resort with a boardwalk overlooking an artificial lake.

==== Daytona Beach ====
The boardwalk in Daytona Beach is a concrete walkway along the beach and includes stores, restaurants, amusement rides, arcades, the Daytona Beach Pier, and the Daytona Beach Bandshell.

==== Hollywood Beach ====
Hollywood Beach has a 2.5-mile (4.0 km) concrete boardwalk known as the "Broadwalk."

==== John's Pass Village and Boardwalk ====
This boardwalk is quite popular, notably with people from Pinellas County and Hillsborough County, Florida. Popular features include Hubbard's Marina, Hooters and Bubba Gump Shrimp Co. There are also various other stores and restaurants on this boardwalk; and the John's Pass Bridge is right next to this location.

==== Gulf Breeze ====
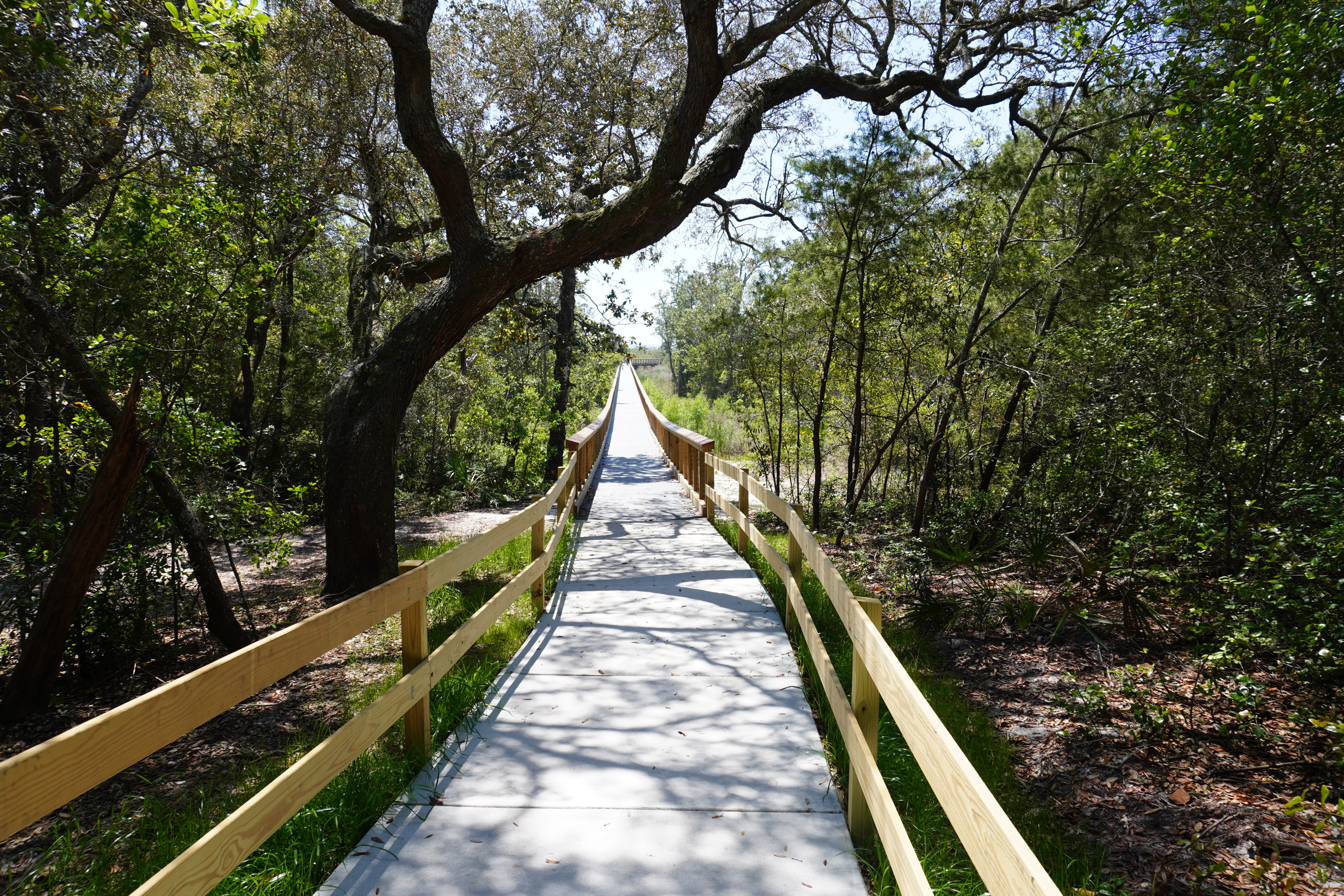
North entrance, one of three to the Wetlands Nature Trail Boardwalk.

A new 1,600-foot (0.49 km) wetlands trail boardwalk is being constructed in the undeveloped portion of Shoreline Park, west of the existing access roadway to the park. The trail will begin and end in uplands, originating at the existing trail opening south of the dog park and terminating at Williamsburg Drive / Colley Cove Drive. The trail will cross through an environmentally sensitive area utilizing an elevated pile-supported boardwalk and will integrate into existing trail systems. The primary purpose of the trail boardwalk is to increase connectivity between Shoreline Park and the adjacent residential areas to the west. The trail will also provide ADA access to the beach along the Santa Rosa Sound waterfront.

=== Hawaii ===
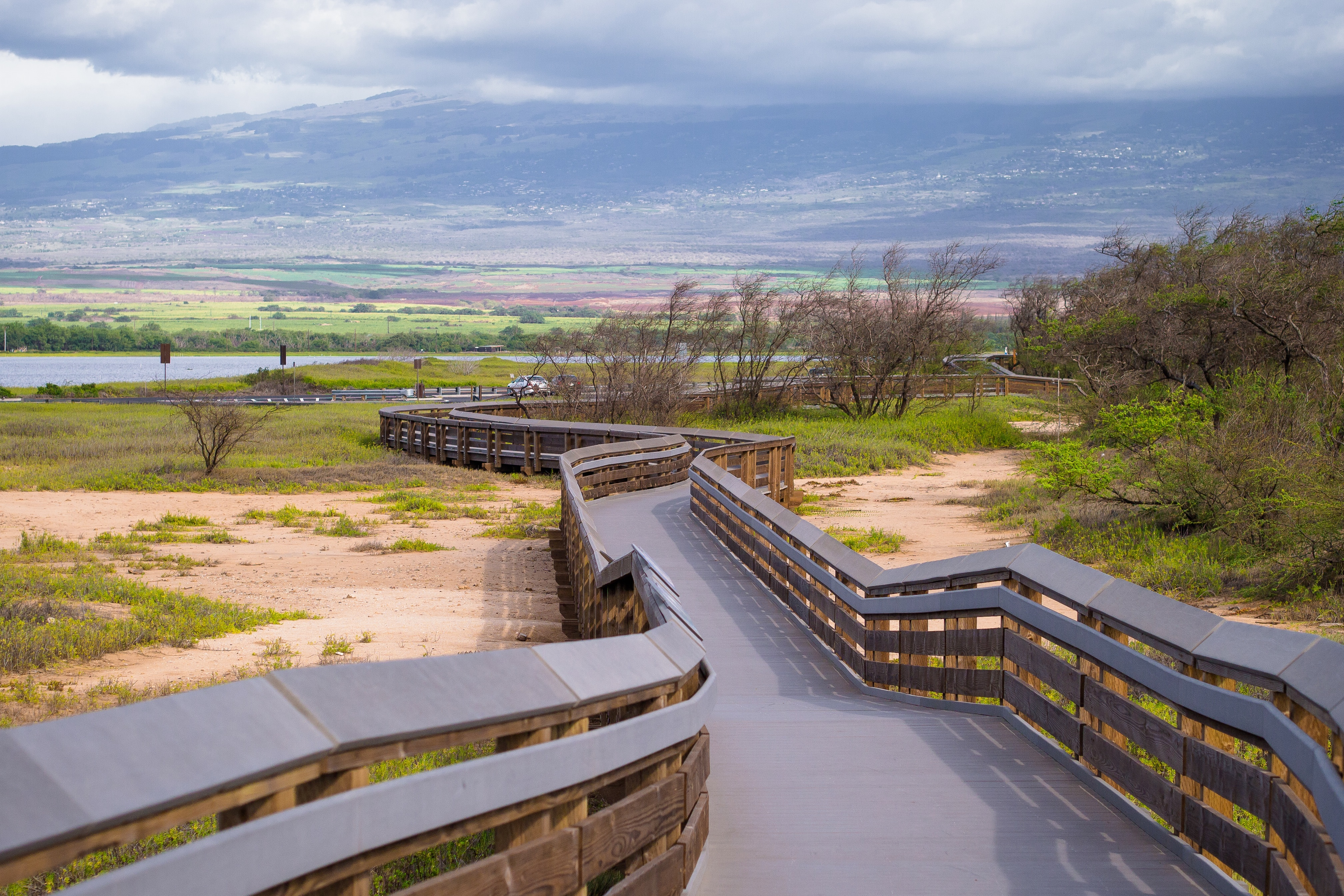
The boardwalk at Kealia Pond National Wildlife Refuge in Maui, Hawaii

A boardwalk is present on the island of Maui.

=== Indiana ===
- Indiana Beach, Monticello

=== Louisiana ===
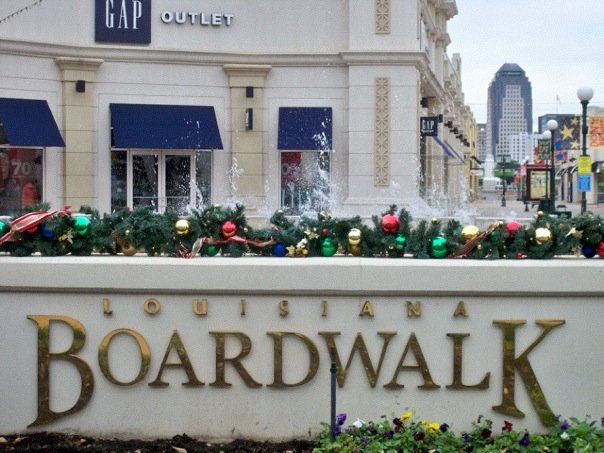
The Louisiana Boardwalk in Bossier City, Louisiana.

==== Lake Charles ====
- Lakefront
- Casino Boardwalk

=== Maine ===
Old Orchard Beach has a boardwalk

=== Maryland ===
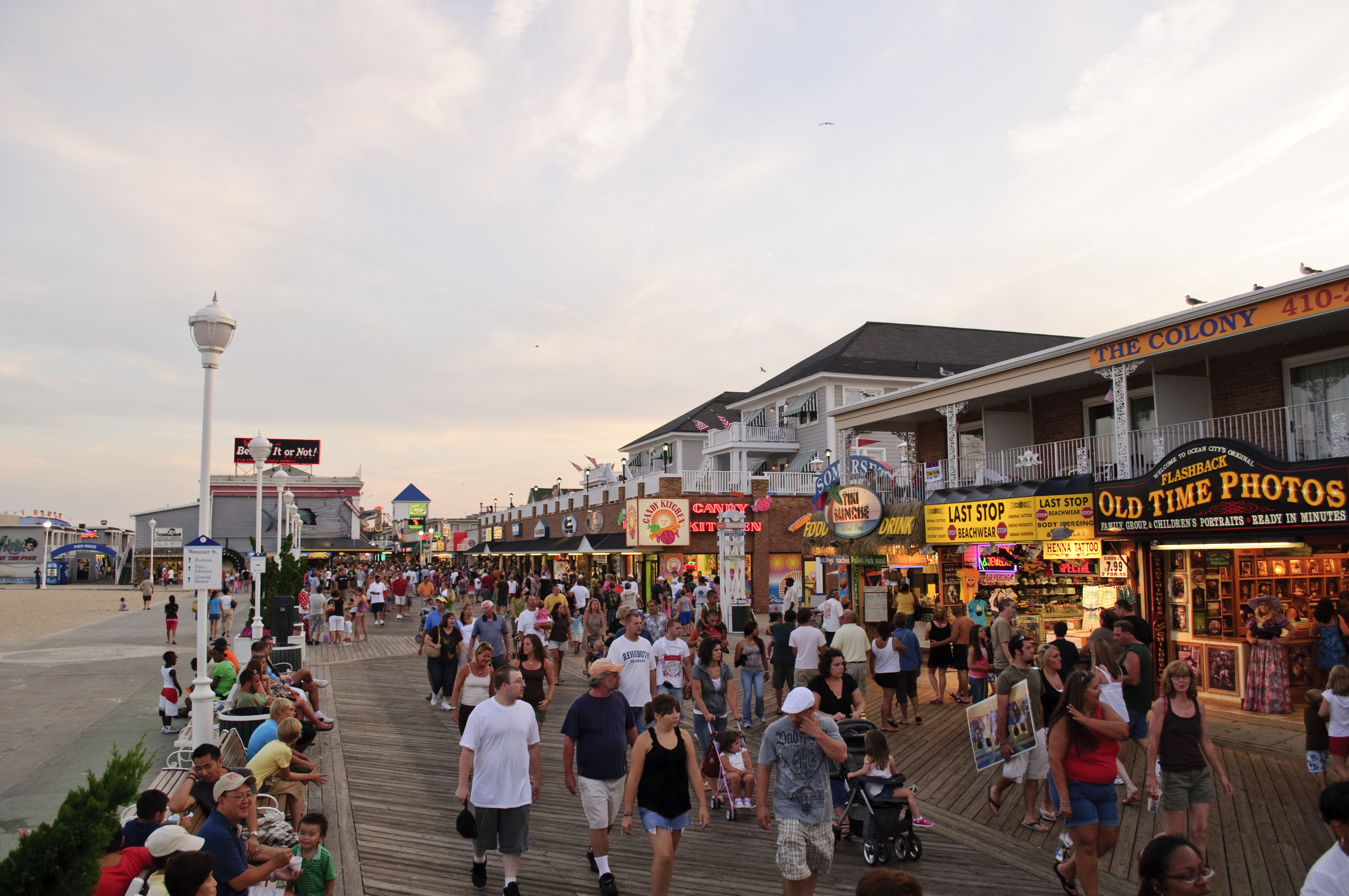
The Ocean City Boardwalk in Ocean City, Maryland.

==== Ocean City ====
This three-mile (5 km) long Ocean City Boardwalk is in downtown Ocean City, Maryland. Located at the eastern end of US 50, it contains a Ripley's Believe it or Not!, as well as arcades, shops, restaurants, hotels, time-shares, and condominiums. The end of the boardwalk hosts Trimper's Rides, an amusement park with roller coasters and a Herschell-Spillman carousel built in 1912, one of the oldest still-operating carousels in the United States. This boardwalk has been rated a top boardwalk in the United States by National Geographic and CNN.

=== Massachusetts ===
==== Sandwich ====
The Sandwich, Massachusetts boardwalk does not, strictly speaking, lead along the beach. Instead, it begins in a parking lot and leads through the salt marshes and out to the beach. It was destroyed in 1991 by Hurricane Bob and was then rebuilt through donations made by the townspeople. In turn, family names were carved into the planks of the boardwalk, and it is still used to this day. The boardwalk crosses a creek, where at high tide, visitors can jump off the bridge into the water.

=== New Hampshire ===
==== Hampton Beach ====
The Hampton Beach boardwalk is frequented by tourists and locals alike. In fact, it is widely used for common shops.

=== New Jersey ===
Many of the cities and towns of New Jersey have their own separate boardwalk. A few have a strip along the beach with water rides, including water slides, lazy rivers, wave pools, and amusement parks hosting rides such as roller coasters, carousels, ferris wheels, and teacups.

==== Asbury Park ====
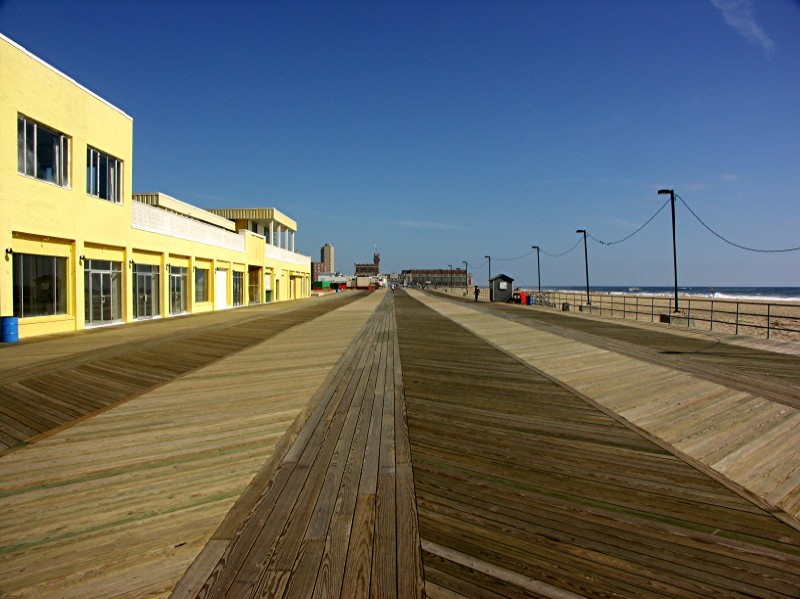
The boardwalk in Asbury Park, New Jersey.

Asbury Park's boardwalk was built in 1871, which featured an orchestra pavilion, public changing rooms, and a pier. In 1888, the Palace Amusements building was built, which housed a carousel and numerous other attractions. In 1929, the Convention Hall, Paramount Theater, and Casino building were built. In 1973 The Stone Pony, a famous music venue where musicians like Bruce Springsteen and Bon Jovi launched their careers was built adjacent to the boardwalk. Asbury Park fell on hard times starting in the 1960s, with the boardwalk and city losing numerous businesses and falling into disrepair. The Palace Amusements complex closed in 1988, and was demolished in 2004, although the carousel and the famed Tillie mural were saved. Half of the Casino building was demolished in 2006, although part of it still remains as a rotating art exhibit.

Asbury Park began its revitalization in the 2000s. In 2002, the city released their Waterfront Redevelopment Plan. In 2007, the boardwalk began an extensive restoration process that restored the Convention Hall, Paramount Theater, and numerous pavilions on the boardwalk. There are several hotels adjacent to the boardwalk, such as the LGBT-oriented Empress Hotel and Paradise Nightclub, the Ocean Club Hotel, and the Berkeley Oceanfront Hotel. In 2020, the north end of the boardwalk reconstruction project was completed. Revitalization and rehabilitation efforts continue into 2023. The boardwalk connects to the boardwalk of neighboring Ocean Grove to the south.

==== Atlantic City ====
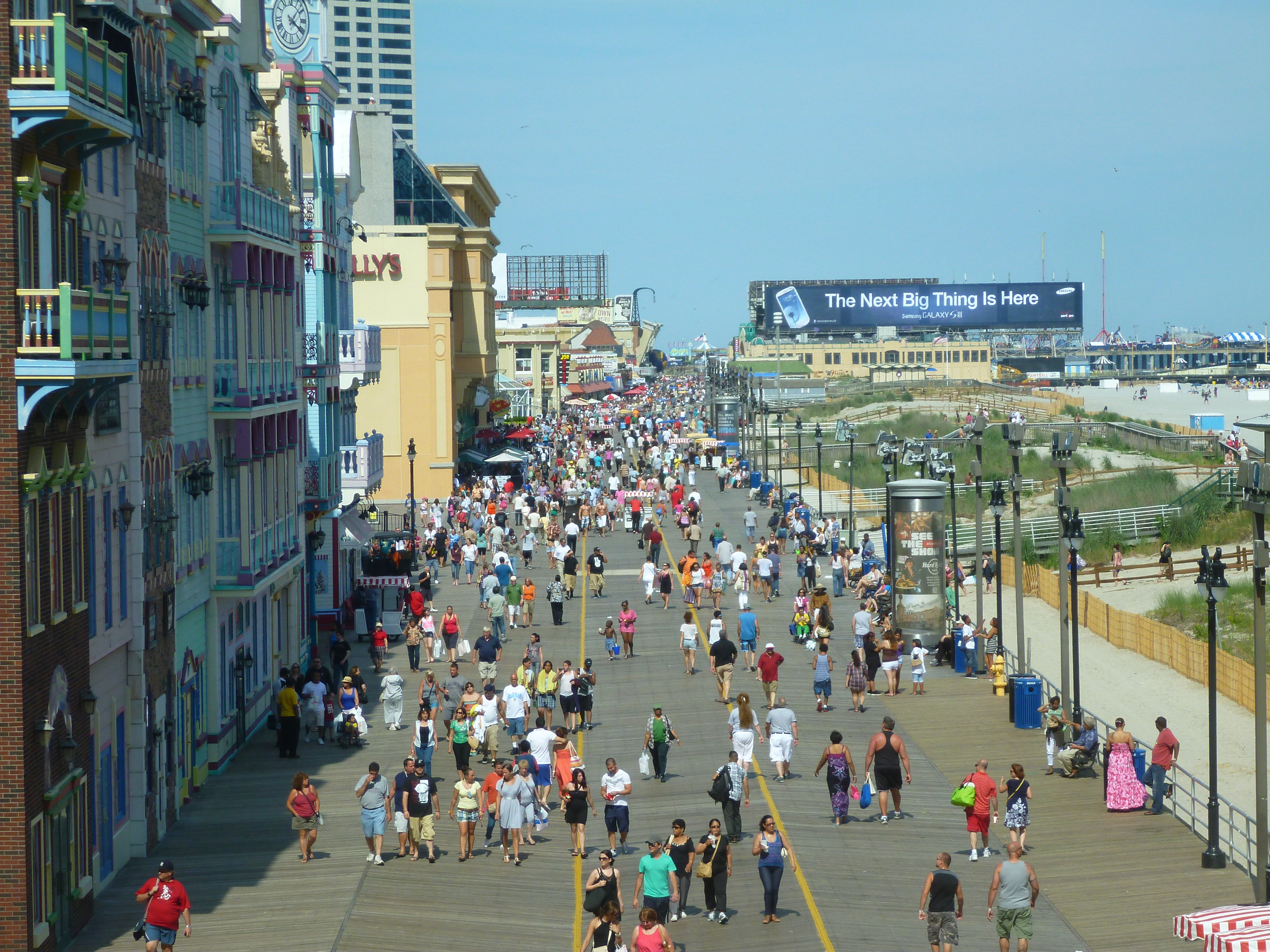
The Atlantic City boardwalk in 2012.

The Atlantic City Boardwalk was the first boardwalk in the United States, opening on June 26, 1870. The Boardwalk starts at Absecon Inlet and runs along the beach for 4 miles (6 km) to the city limit. An additional 1.5 miles (2.4 km) of the Boardwalk extends into Ventnor City. Casino/hotels front the boardwalk, as well as retail stores, restaurants, and amusements. Several piers extend the boardwalk over the Atlantic Ocean. This boardwalk gained fame due to the board game Monopoly, which was based upon the trading and dealing of real estate in Atlantic City; in the game, Boardwalk is the most expensive property to purchase and develop, but also yields the greatest rent payoffs to its owner. Casinos along the boardwalk include the Tropicana Casino & Resort, Caesars, Bally's, Resorts Casino Hotel, Hard Rock Hotel & Casino, and Ocean Casino Resort. The former casino turned non-gaming hotel Showboat still remains as well. The abandoned Atlantic Club Casino remains on the south end of the boardwalk. There are numerous small stores along the boardwalk too similar to other Jersey Shore boardwalks, as well as the Jim Whelan Boardwalk Hall. Stockton University has its Atlantic City satellite campus located on the south end as well.

In October 2012, Hurricane Sandy destroyed the northern part of the boardwalk fronting Absecon Inlet, in the residential section called South Inlet. The oceanfront boardwalk in front of the Atlantic City casinos survived the storm undamaged.

The Boardwalk has been home to several piers over the years. The first pier, Ocean Pier, was built in 1882. It eventually fell into disrepair and was demolished. Another famous pier built during that time was Steel Pier, opened in 1898, which once billed itself as "The Showplace of the Nation". It now operates as an amusement pier across from the Hard Rock Hotel & Casino. Captain John Lake Young opened "Young's Million Dollar Pier" as an arcade hall in 1903, and on the seaward side "erected a marble mansion", fronted by a formal garden, with lighting and landscaping designed by Young's longtime friend Thomas Alva Edison. Young's Million Dollar Pier, Atlantic City's largest amusement pier during its time", was transformed into a shopping mall in the 1980s, known as "Shops on Ocean One". In 2006, the Ocean One mall was bought, renovated and re-branded as "The Pier Shops at Caesars" and, in 2015, it was renamed "Playground Pier." However, in recent years it has become a dead mall, with less than 10 stores remaining. Garden Pier, located opposite Ocean Casino Resort, once housed a movie theater, and was home to the Atlantic City Historical Society and Arts Center before they moved to the Jim Whelan Boardwalk Hall. Two other piers, an amusement pier named Steeplechase Pier and a Heinz 57-owned pier named Heinz Pier were destroyed in the 1944 Great Atlantic Hurricane. Steeplechase was rebuilt after the hurricane, and survived into the casino era. The "Steeplechase Pier Heliport" on Steel Pier is named in its honor. The last of the four piers still standing is Schiff's Central Pier, which is the only one still offering the same attractions it did when it opened – a few stores, and the playcade, having reopened in 1990 after an $8 million renovation.

==== Keansburg ====
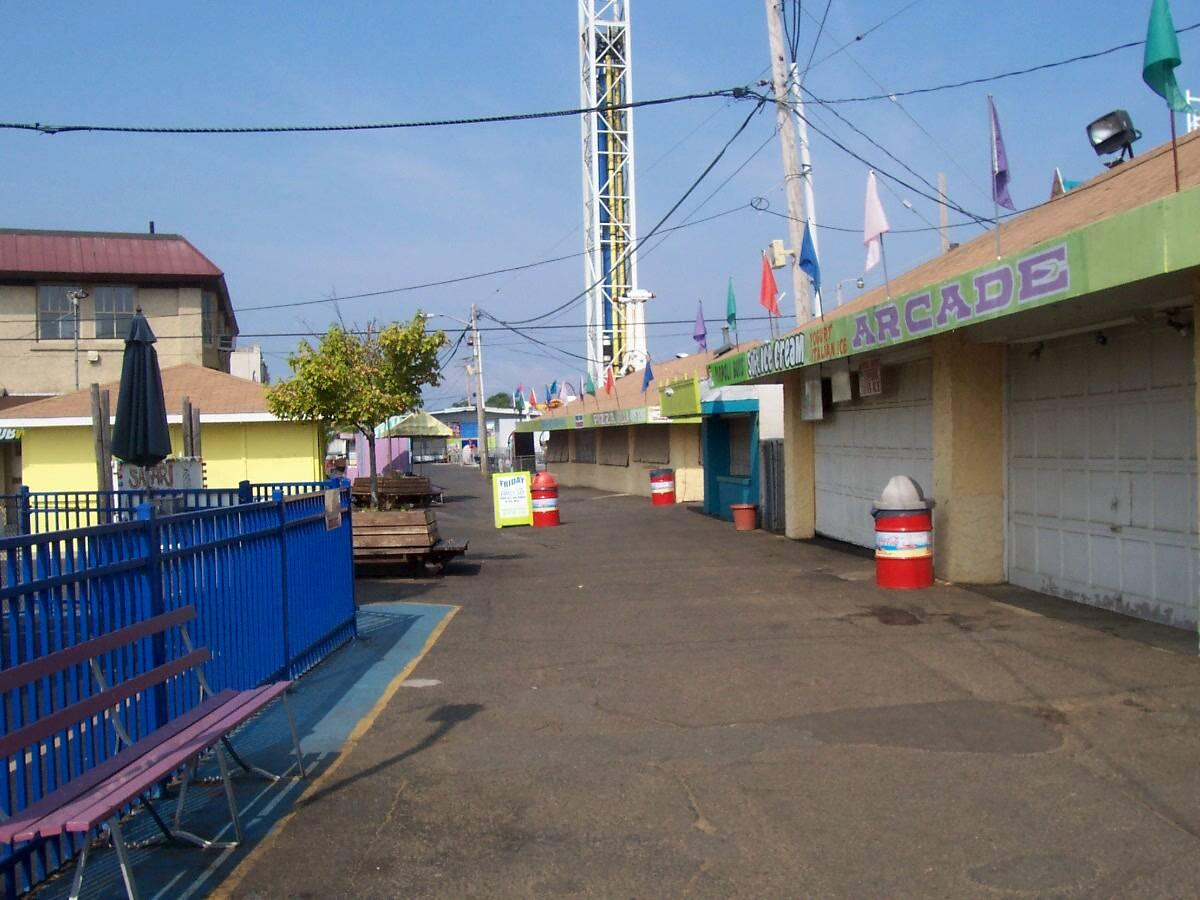
The amusement area in Keansburg houses vintage rides from the 1920s.

Keansburg is regarded locally as a boardwalk town, with one of America's oldest shoreside amusement parks housing vintage rides dating back to the 1920s, known as Keansburg Amusement Park, which is accompanied by the Runaway Rapids waterpark next door, but the amusement area fairway is now asphalt. There is a 2000-foot fishing pier at the end of the amusement park. There is also a 0.12 mile boardwalk down the street from the amusement park.

==== Long Branch ====
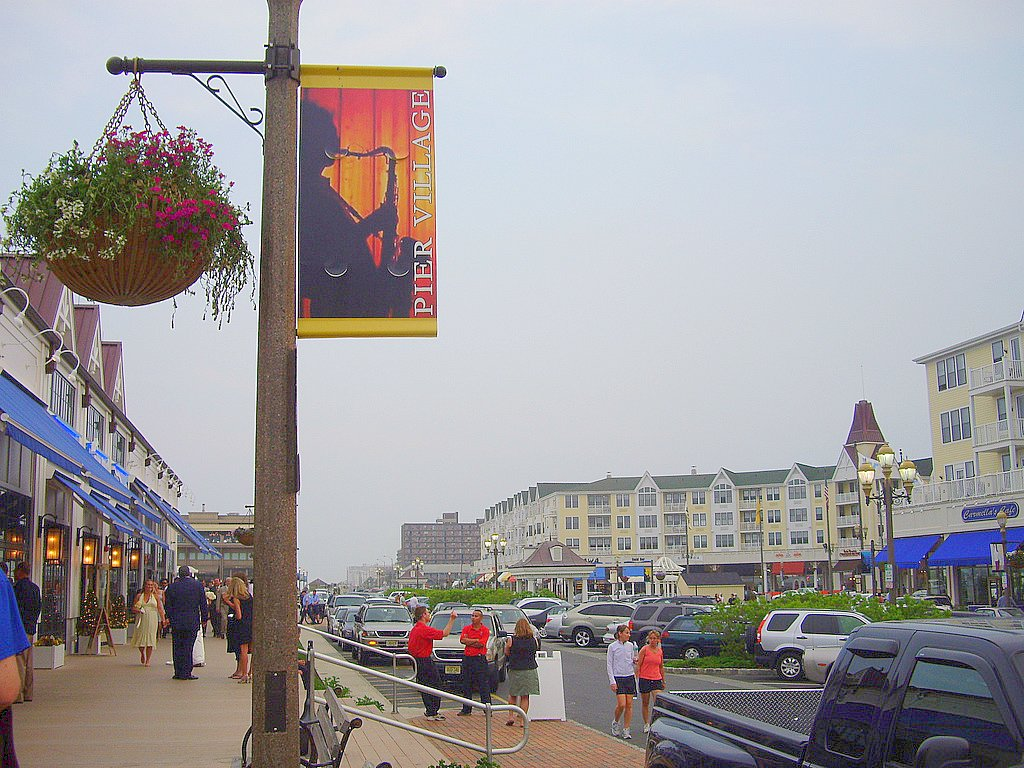
Pier Village along the oceanfront in Long Branch

Long Branch developed into a resort town in the late 18th century, with oceanside hotels, large estates, and grand theaters. Long Branch has had numerous piers throughout its history. The first pier, "Bath House Pier" was built in 1828, but was destroyed in 1854 due to a nor'easter. In 1875, the "East End Exclusion Pier" opened, but was destroyed after a month due to faulty construction. In 1879, the "Ocean Pier" was opened, but was heavily damaged and removed in 1881. In 1881, the "Iron Pier" was constructed, but was heavily damaged by a storm and tugboat collision in 1901, leading to its removal in 1908. In 1913, the "Amusement/Fishing Pier" opened at 950 feet, although in 1945 a hurricane destroyed the end part of it. However, in 1987 the pier caught on fire, and was removed in 1998. In contrast to the destruction of its several piers, Long Branch has maintained a 1.9 mile boardwalk that opened in 1906, which stretches from Seven Presidents Oceanfront Park in the north to the end of Ocean Avenue N/Brighton Ave by Elberon.

In 2005, Pier Village, a Victorian-inspired mixed-use community consisting of rental residences atop retail space, opened, although it notably lacked a pier like previous iterations of the waterfront. A public grassy area called Festival Plaza is the site of regular events, including concerts, arts & crafts fairs, outdoor movies and holiday events. Long Branch is also home to Max's Famous Hotdogs and its rival, the original WindMill Hot Dogs, located in a windmill-shaped building since 1963. Condominiums continue to be developed rapidly apace along the Long Branch boardwalk as a part of the Pier Village plan.

==== Manasquan ====
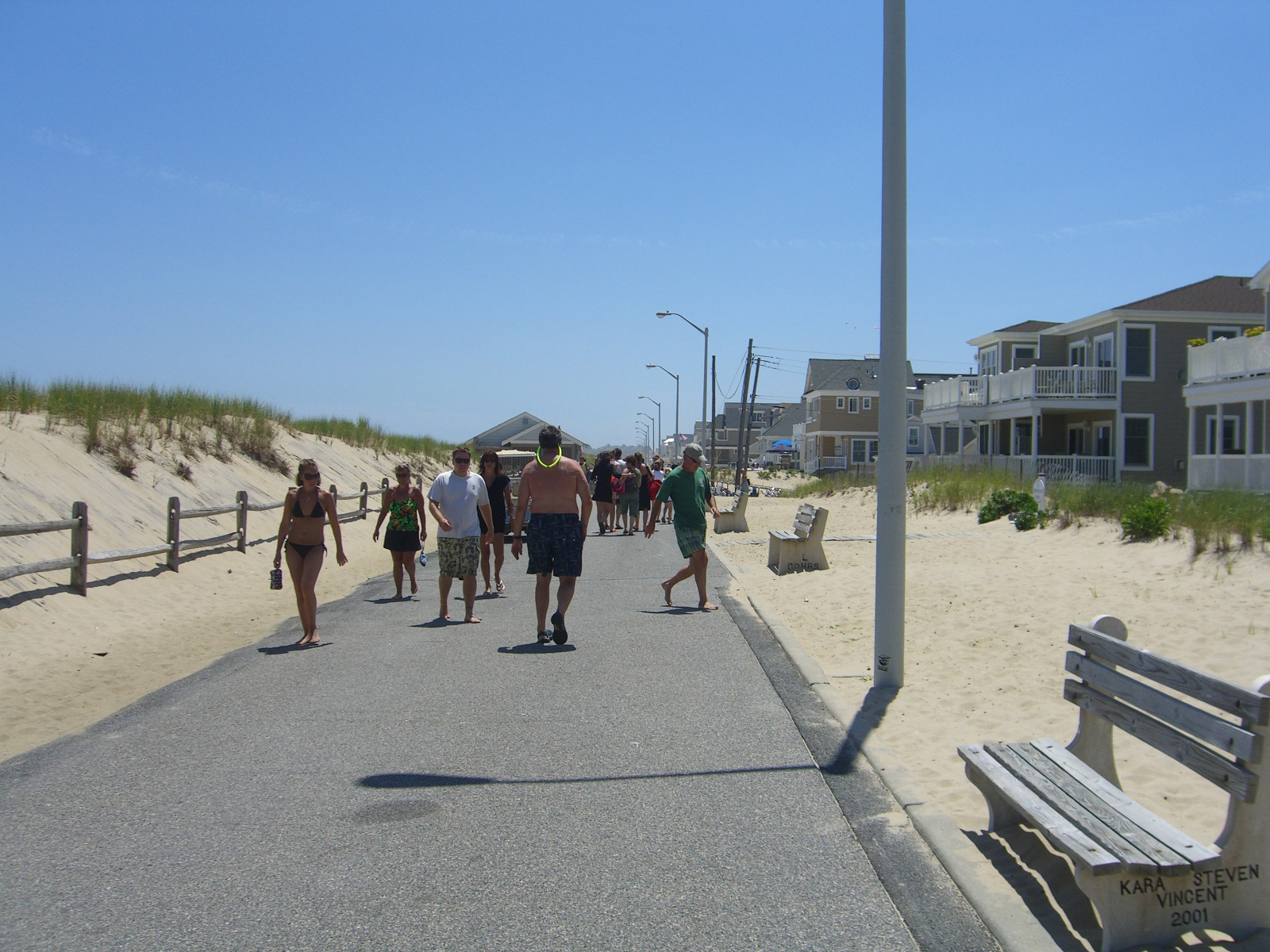
The boardwalk at Manasquan

Manasquan hosts a busy 1 mile long asphalt boardwalk in Monmouth County, New Jersey. The borough maintains an aggressive cleaning protocol for both the boardwalk and the beach. The boardwalk runs from Ocean Avenue in the north to Manasquan Inlet in the south and is primarily lined by private residences. The boardwalk, originally built in the 1800s, which once featured numerous pavilions and an amusement park, was wooden until it was replaced by asphalt in the 1950s. The Manasquan Inlet is the northern terminus of the inland portion of the Intracoastal Waterway. It provides surfers with waves that are corralled, refracted, and enlarged by the jetty protruding out into the Atlantic Ocean.

==== Ocean City, New Jersey ====
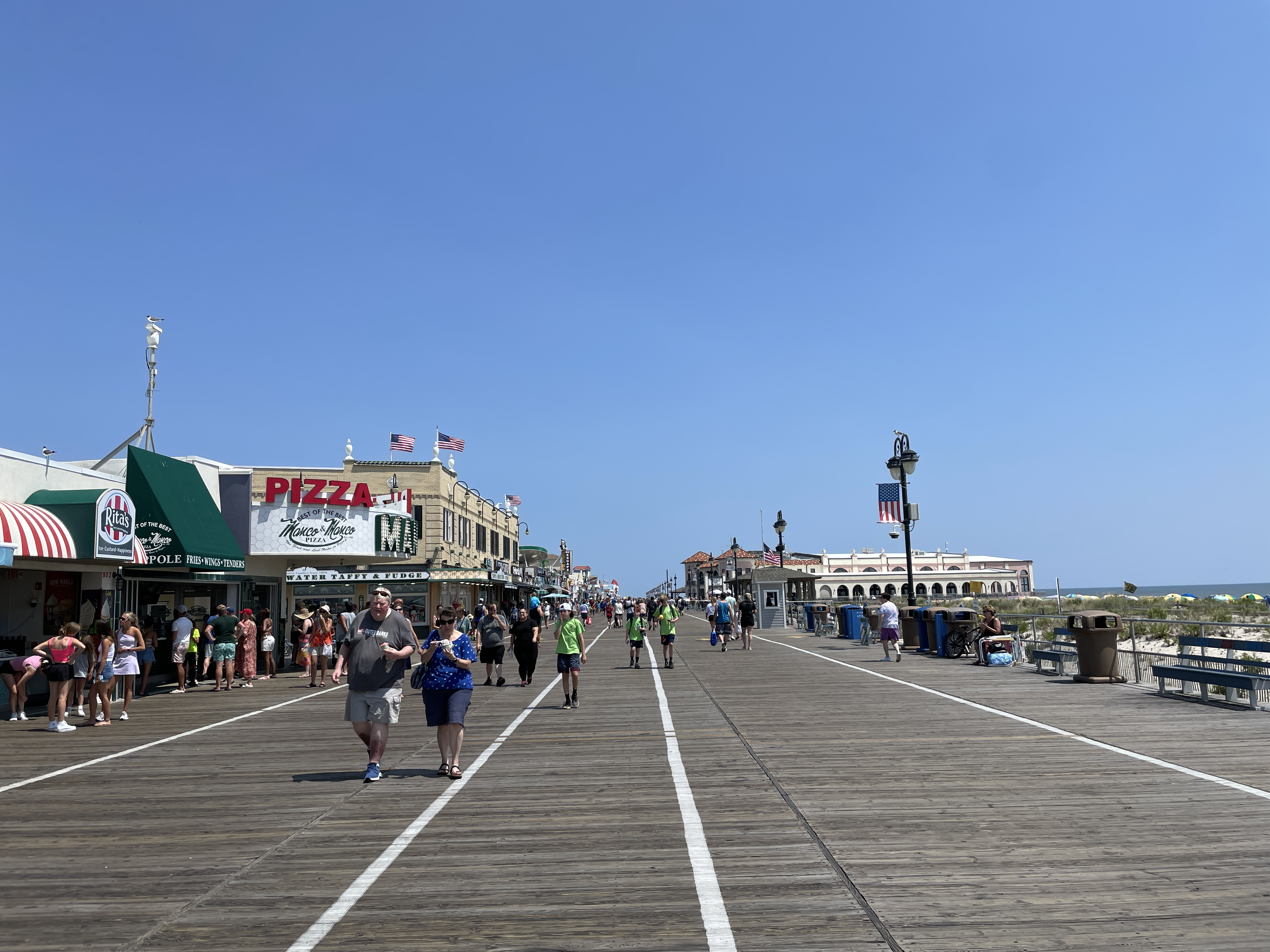
Ocean City, New Jersey boardwalk looking north at 9th Street

Ocean City, a notable dry town, first built its wooden boardwalk in 1880 from the Second Street wharf to Fourth Street and West Avenue. In 1885, plans were made to extend the boardwalk the entire length of the beach after the first amusement pavilion opened on 11th Street into the 2.5-mile (4 km) length it is today. Moore's Bowling Casino opened at Moorlyn Terrace in 1905, and later a roller rink and a theater were added. It ultimately became the Moorlyn Theatre, home to vaudeville acts and silent movies with live organ accompaniment. In 1929, the Showboat Theatre, later known as the Surf, was built, first as a venue for vaudeville acts but later became a movie theater. Finally, in 1938, the Shriver Theater opened at 9th and the boardwalk, later to become The Strand. None of these theaters remain today, although they were all converted into different purposes.

The boardwalk has been home to the Ocean City Baby Parade since 1909. The grand oceanfront Flanders Hotel was built in the 1920s. In 1927, a fire destroyed the entire boardwalk, although the Flanders Hotel was spared. Music Pier, a music venue, was built in 1929. In 1930, an amusement park known as "Gillian's Fun Deck" opened. In 1965, Gillian's Wonderland Pier opened, which featured the 144-foot (44 m) Ferris wheel that can be seen from miles around, with views of Ocean City and the surrounding communities from the top, and is one of the tallest Ferris wheels on the east coast. Other rides include roller coasters, carousels, bumper cars, water rides, and 11 miniature golf courses, with some rides dating back to the 1920s. Gillian's Fun Deck closed in the 1980s but was replaced by Gillian's Island Water Park and mini-golf. In the 1990s, a pirate-themed amusement park called Castaway Cove opened where the pool once stood at the Flanders Hotel. Today, the boardwalk is home to numerous businesses, restaurants pop-up shows, and attractions, and the city dubs itself as "America's Greatest Family Resort".

==== Point Pleasant Beach ====
The Point Pleasant Beach boardwalk is located about seven miles (11 km) north of the Seaside Heights boardwalk. The promenade extends from the Manasquan Inlet in the northern end of the borough to the border with Bay Head in the south. Attractions include bars, eateries, arcades, two mini-golf courses, a fun house, an amusement park, an aquarium, and souvenir shops.

==== Seaside Heights ====
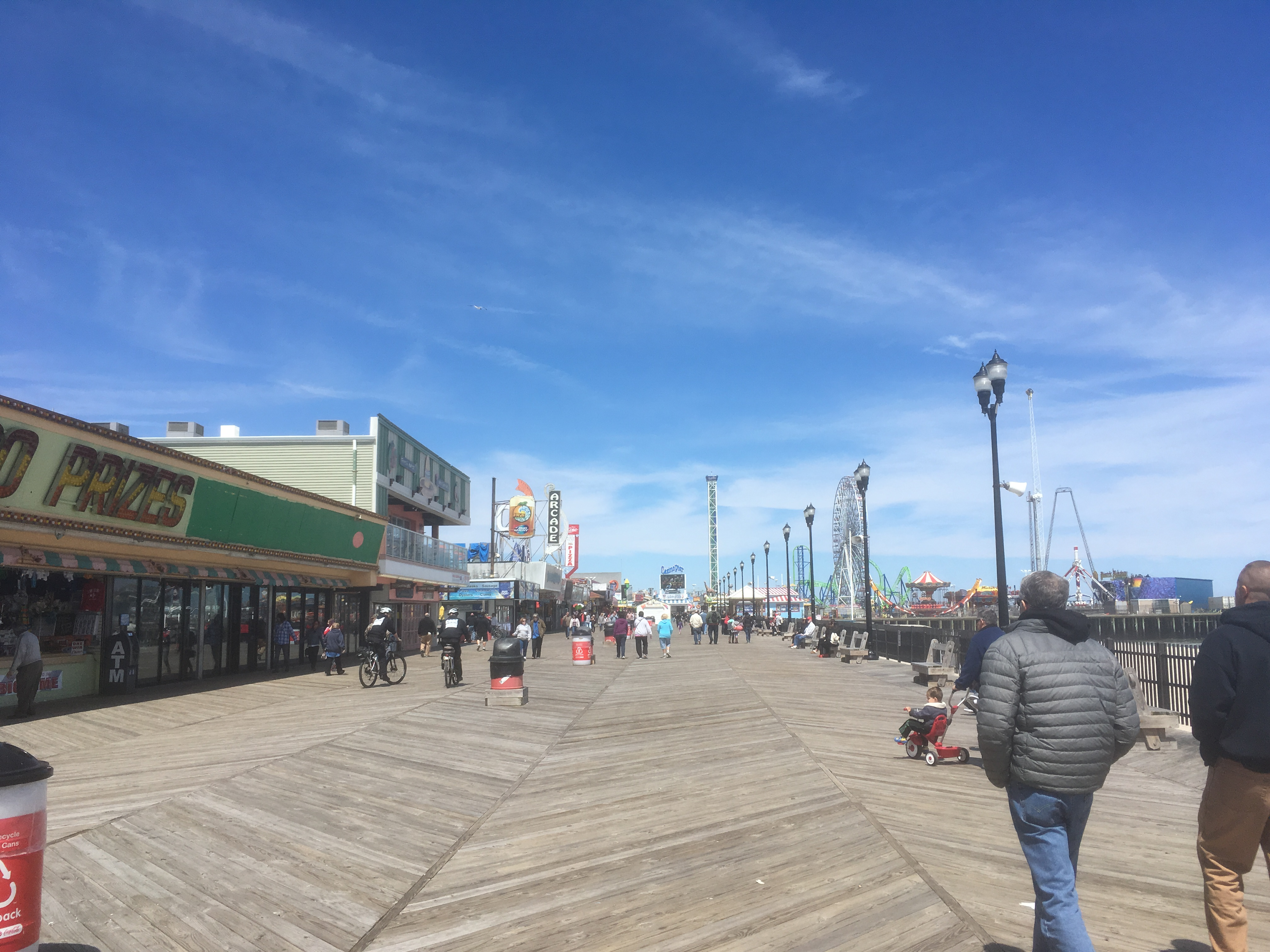
The Seaside Heights boardwalk looking towards the Casino Pier

Known as the “Classic American Boardwalk,” The 1-mile (1.6 km) long promenade is full of game stands, pizzerias, souvenir shops, beach gear stores, arcades and ice cream parlors drawing families, teenagers and adults alike. The Seaside Heights boardwalk is bookended by two 300-foot-long (91 m) piers that feature amusement rides, carousels, log flumes, roller coasters, Ferris wheels and more. One of these piers is the world-famous Casino Pier, home to the Hydrus roller coaster The other was the Funtown Amusement Pier, which was destroyed by Hurricane Sandy with plans to replace it. Across from Casino Pier is the redeveloped Breakwater Beach waterpark which is owned by Casino Pier(formerly WaterWorks). Many of the businesses are still family-owned and operated and have been almost as long as the boardwalk has been around.

The boardwalk was destroyed by Hurricane Sandy in October 2012 but has since been rebuilt.

==== Wildwood ====
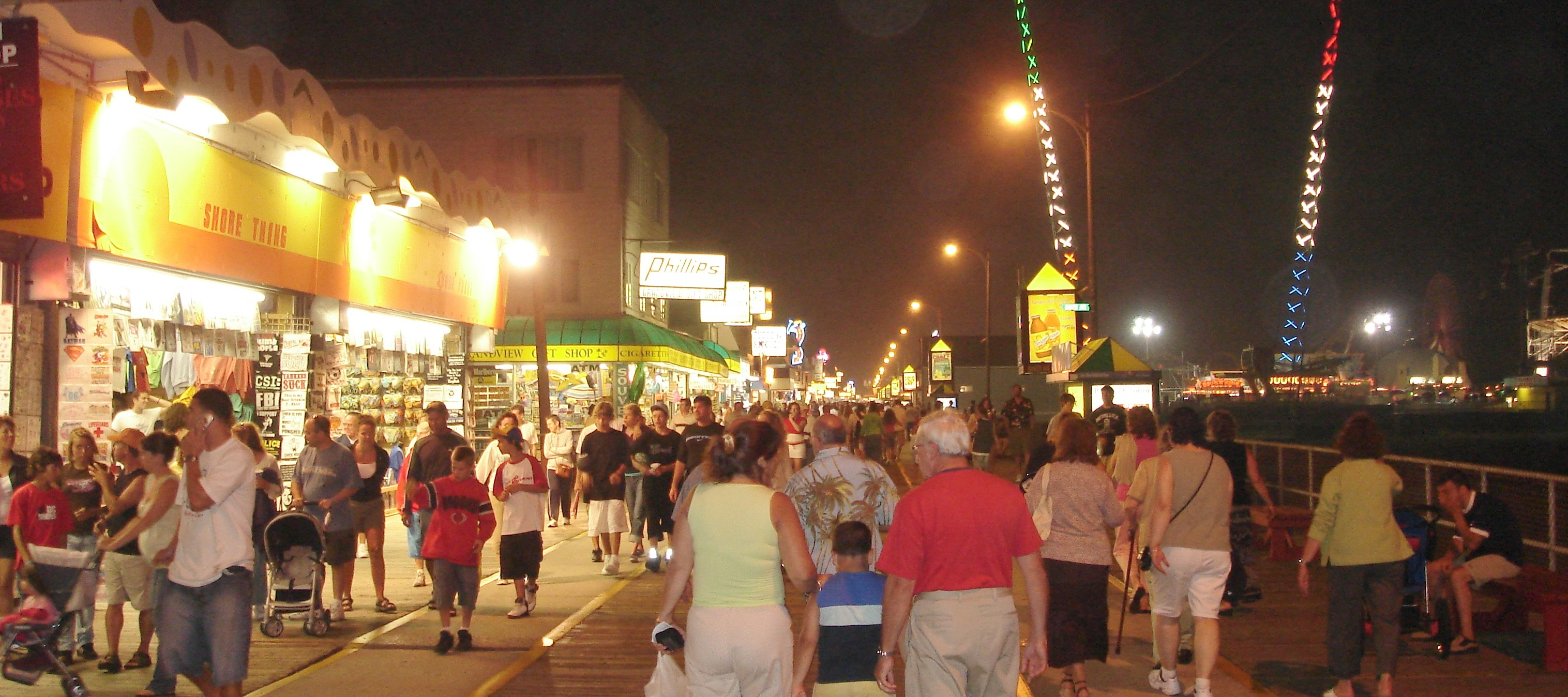
Wildwood, New Jersey Boardwalk, from the front of the Boardwalk Chapel.

Known as the Boardwalk of Fame and Happiness, the 2-mile (3.2 km) long boardwalk in Wildwood has a total of three amusement piers plus a myriad of other carnival games, souvenir shops, food stands, water parks, and many rides including world-class roller coasters. The Boardwalk started out as a mere 150 feet (46 m). It has actually been moved closer to the ocean twice. Today, the boardwalk stretches for 38 blocks from 16th Ave in North Wildwood to Cresse Ave in Wildwood Crest. The Wildwood Boardwalk is said to have more rides than Disneyland. The Boardwalk piers also have several water parks and many other rides, and six roller coasters, including four major ones, and includes a giant ferris wheel — one of the largest on the east coast.

In 2008-2009 a section of the boardwalk was rebuilt. As of 2022, the boardwalk is undergoing reconstruction in stages.

=== New York ===
==== Coney Island, Brooklyn ====
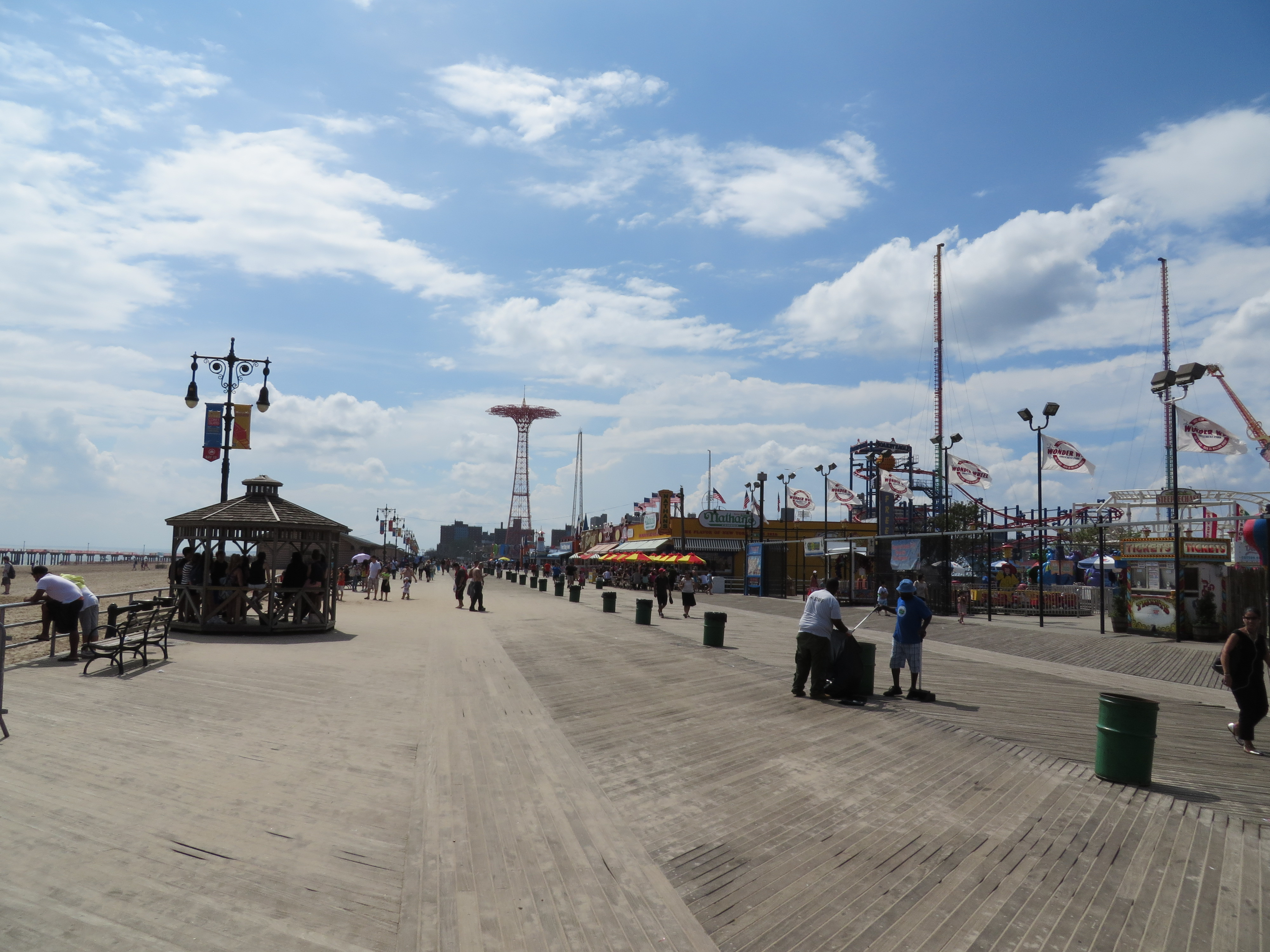
Riegelmann Boardwalk, Coney Island

Riegelmann Boardwalk runs for 2.51 miles (4.04 km) on Coney Island, along the southern shore of Brooklyn adjacent to the Atlantic Ocean. It became known for its amusement parks along the boardwalk, and contains the Cyclone roller coaster, the Wonder Wheel Ferris wheel, the Luna Park and Deno's Wonder Wheel Amusement Park amusement parks, and the defunct Parachute Jump ride, as well as the New York Aquarium. The boardwalk also contains MCU Park, home of the minor league Brooklyn Cyclones baseball team.

==== Jones Beach ====
The 2 miles (3.2 km) long Jones Beach Boardwalk runs along the central section of the 10 mi (16 km) Jones Beach State Park, created during the administration of Robert Moses and opened in 1929. It is accessible from the mainland via the Meadowbrook State Parkway or the Wantagh State Parkway. Apart from a few amenities such as a two bathhouses and several refreshment stands, the boardwalk is much less commercialized compared with other boardwalks in the region. The historic Boardwalk Restaurant, built in the 1930s and rebuilt in 1966 was demolished in 2004 pending redevelopment by Trump Entertainment Resorts. It was expected to open in 2014, but it was later cancelled due to worry of damage from future hurricanes after Hurricane Sandy. The Boardwalk Bandshell, originally adjacent to the restaurant, was moved from the east to the west side of the central mall and still serves as a popular venue for summertime beachside concerts.

==== Atlantic Beach ====
Atlantic Beach, A narrow 0.6-mile (1 km) boardwalk stretches from Acapulco Street to Putnam Avenue along the Atlantic Ocean beach in the incorporated Village of Atlantic Beach. The boardwalk, which is in a dangerous state of disrepair, stands on wooden piles, with several beach clubs situated under it at places.

==== Long Beach ====
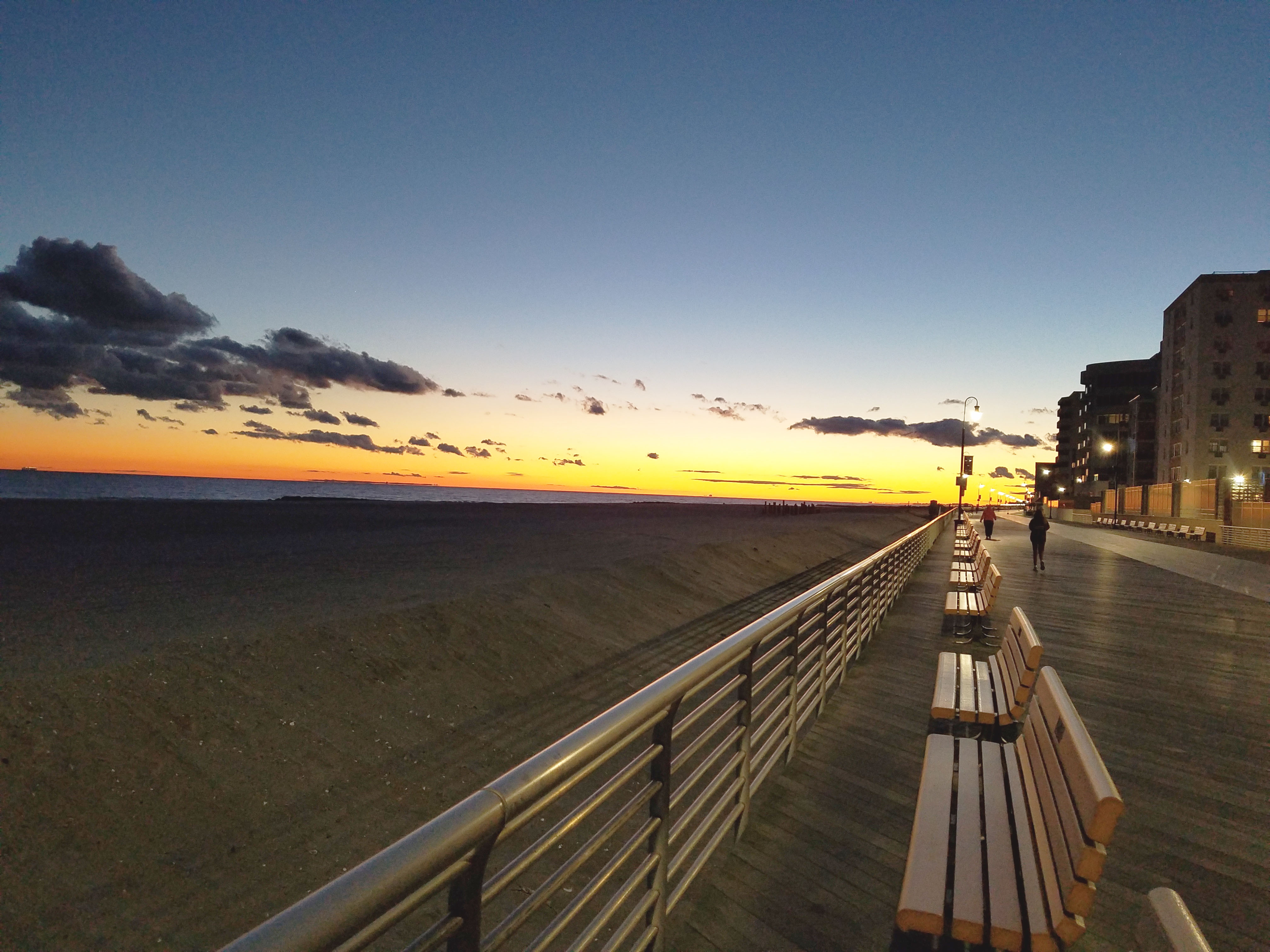
Long Beach, NY boardwalk at sunset

Long Beach, nicknamed "The City By the Sea" and once known as "The Riviera of the East", boasts a 2.2-mile (3.5-km) boardwalk east of New York Avenue, which was planned and developed in 1906–1907 by Tammany Hall-connected real estate developer and former New York senator William H. Reynolds. In an effective publicity stunt, Reynolds had a herd of elephants trucked in from Coney Island's Dreamland amusement park, ostensibly to help build the boardwalk.

==== Rockaway, Queens ====
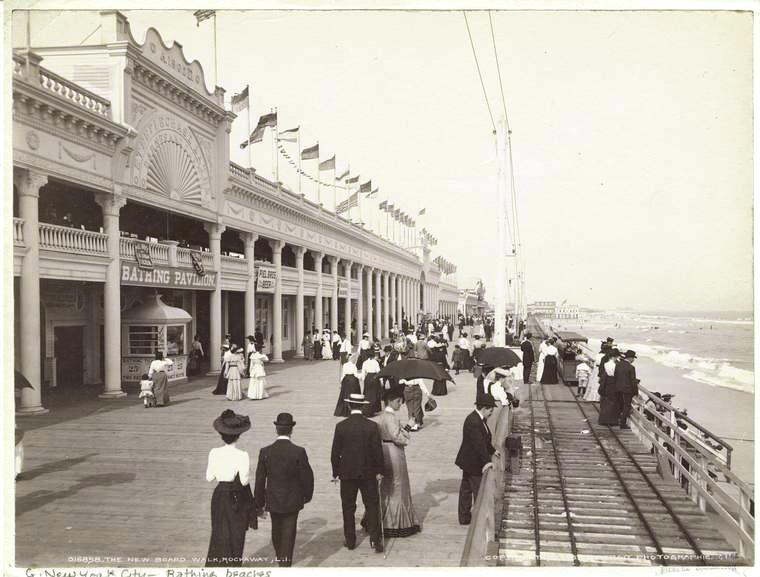
Rockaway Boardwalk, 1903

The Rockaway Boardwalk is 5.5 miles (9 km) long, the longest in the United States within one city. The boardwalk runs from Beach 9th Street in Far Rockaway to Beach 126th Street in Rockaway Park, at the edge of Belle Harbor. While several unconnected sections were first built at the end of the 19th century, most of the construction of the original boardwalk began in 1925 and completed in 1928. The concrete boardwalk from Beach 9th Street to Beach 19th Street was completed in 1963. The boardwalk and its adjacent 170 acres of beaches are maintained by the NYC Parks Department and policed by the NYC Parks Enforcement Patrol.

==== South Beach, Staten Island ====
The Franklin D. Roosevelt Boardwalk along South Beach is 2.5 miles (4 km) long, making it the fourth longest boardwalk in the world. The boardwalk was built in 1935, replacing an existing commercial boardwalk and tourist area that had been ravaged by fires, economic loss and the Great Depression. The boardwalk is part of a New York City public park that stretches from the Fort Wadsworth and the Verrazzano–Narrows Bridge to Miller Field. Both Fort Wadsworth and Miller Field are federal parks.

=== South Carolina ===
==== Myrtle Beach ====
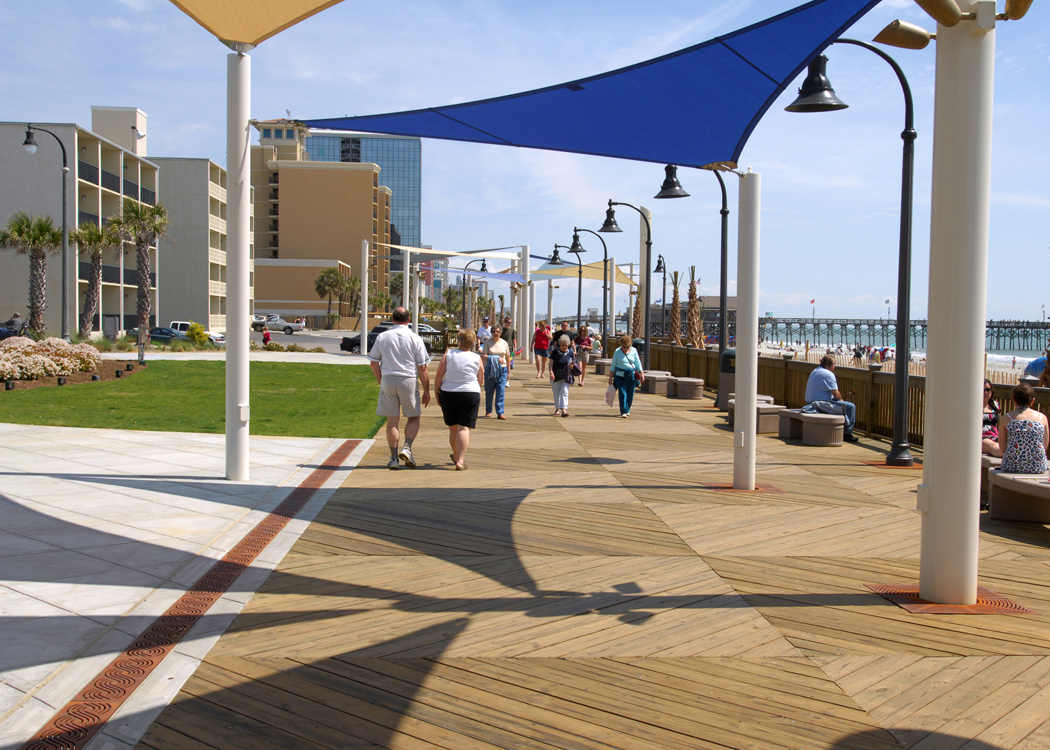
Myrtle Beach Boardwalk

The 1.2 mile Myrtle Beach Boardwalk, finished in 2010, was recognized later that year by National Geographic as the nations's #3 boardwalk behind the ones at Atlantic City and Coney Island.

=== Texas ===
==== Kemah ====
The Kemah Boardwalk is a hotel and restaurant destination in Kemah, Texas, USA, which also features a small selection of amusement rides. The main attractions of the 35-acre (140,000 m^{2}) complex, which opened in 2001, are its many restaurants overlooking Galveston Bay, recreational sailing, and rides. The area was developed by Landry's, which owns all of the restaurants on the boardwalk. Activities include shopping and midway games, as well as a miniature train that traverses the entire area. Additional attractions include a 36-foot (11 m) carousel a 65-foot (20 m) Ferris wheel and a new wooden roller coaster.

=== Virginia ===
==== Virginia Beach ====
Virginia Beach's 3-mile (4.8 km) boardwalk features restaurants, entertainment, and many sporting events.

== Unincorporated Territories of the United States ==
=== Puerto Rico ===
==== La Guancha Boardwalk ====
La Guancha Boardwalk is located on Ponce's seashore. Built in the 1990s, the boardwalk overlooks the Ponce Nautical Club and has many restaurants and bars. It also has kiosks which sell food and alcoholic beverages.

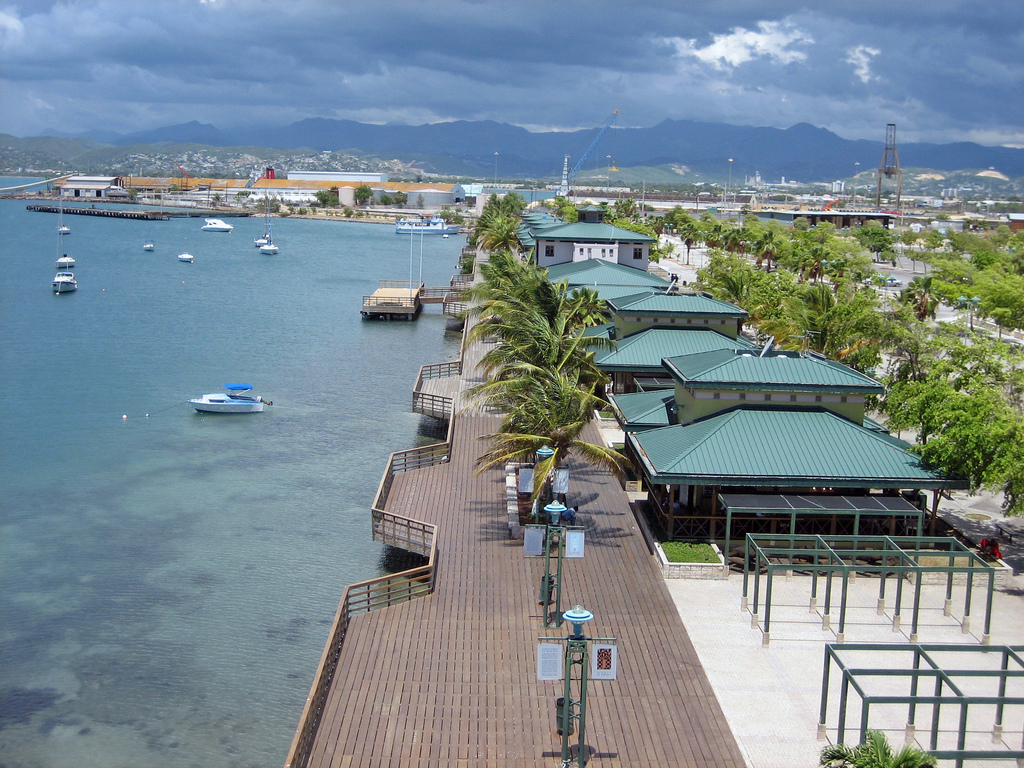

==== Piñones Boardwalk ====
The Pinones Boardwalk starts in Pinones and heads east for 11 km skirting the beaches then crossing PR 187 into the Pinones mangrove forest.

==== Cataño Boardwalk ====
The Cataño Boardwalk commands a view of the San Juan Bay, including views of Fort San Felipe del Morro on the opposing side. There are several monuments and sculptures along the boardwalk, including a monument to Taíno culture called "India Taína".

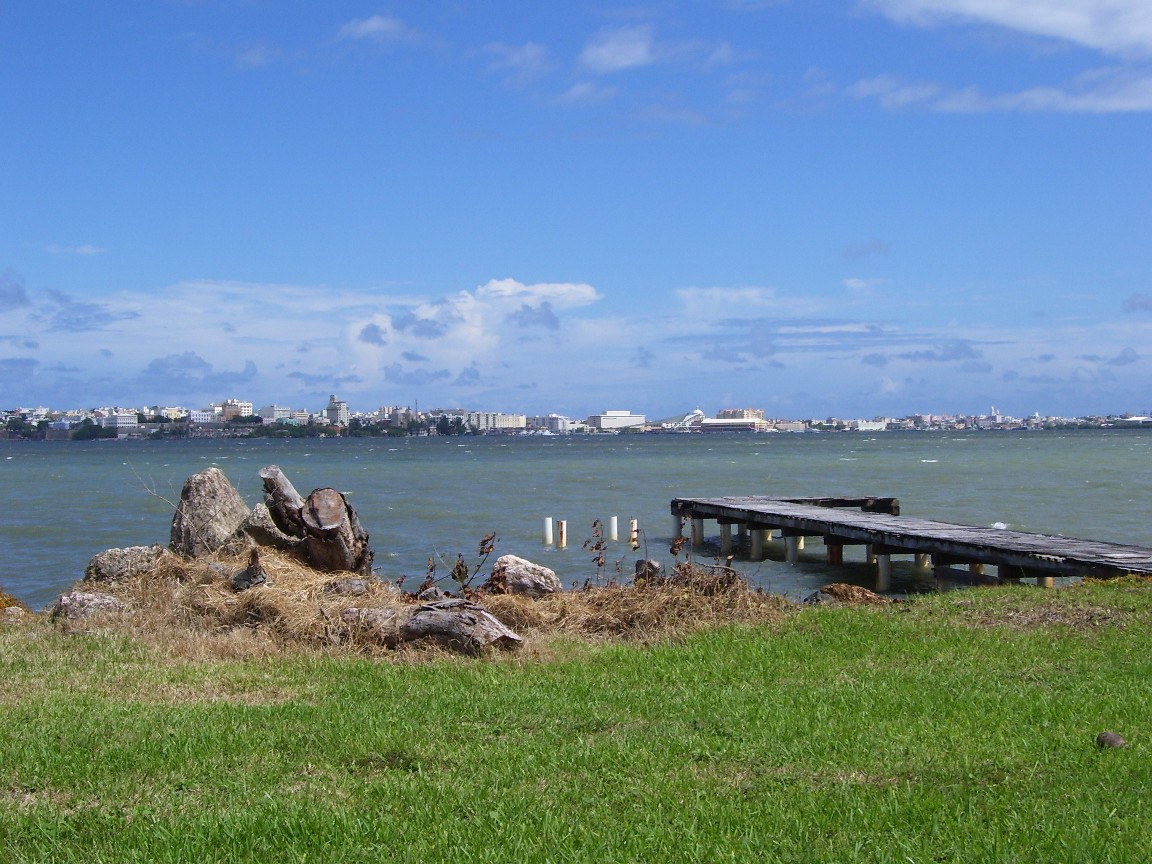
View of the San Juan Bay from the Cataño shore.
