= Tenafly High School =

High school in Bergen County, New Jersey, US

Location
- 19 Columbus Drive; Tenafly, Bergen County, New Jersey 07670; United States; 40.931723°N 73.966655°W

Information
- Type: Public
- NCES School ID: 341611000864
- Principal: James O. Morrison
- Faculty: 101.9 FTEs
- Grades: 9-12
- Enrollment: 1,141 (as of 2024–25)
- Student to teacher ratio: 11.2:1
- Colors: Black and orange
- Athletics conference: Big North Conference (general); North Jersey Super Football Conference (football)
- Team name: Tigers
- Rival: Dumont High School
- Publication: Omega (literary and art magazine)
- Newspaper: The Echo
- Website: ths.tenaflyschools.org

Tenafly High School is a four-year comprehensive community public high school in Tenafly in Bergen County, in the U.S. state of New Jersey, serving students in ninth through twelfth grades as the lone secondary school of the Tenafly Public Schools. Students from the neighboring community of Alpine attend the school as part of a sending/receiving relationship with the Alpine Public School.

As of the 2024–25 school year, the school had an enrollment of 1,141 students and 101.9 classroom teachers (on an FTE basis), for a student–teacher ratio of 11.2:1. There were 25 students (2.2% of enrollment) eligible for free lunch and 10 (0.9% of students) eligible for reduced-cost lunch.

== History ==
Until October 1962, when the initial wing of Cresskill High School opened, Cresskil's students in grades seven to twelve had attended Tenafly High School. Students already in the Tenafly district for grades 11 and 12 when the Cresskill school opened remained at Tenafly High School until graduation.

== Awards, recognition and rankings ==
Tenafly High School was recognized by the National Blue Ribbon School Award by the United States Department of Education at a special assembly to the Tenafly High School community on September 20, 2005. Tenafly was the only high school in New Jersey and one of 38 public high schools in the U.S. to receive the 2005 Blue Ribbon School Award.

The school was the 17th-ranked public high school in New Jersey out of 339 schools statewide in New Jersey Monthly magazine's September 2014 cover story on the state's "Top Public High Schools", using a new ranking methodology. The school had been ranked 3rd in the state of 328 schools in 2012, after being ranked 3rd in 2010 out of 322 schools listed. The magazine ranked the school third in 2008 out of 316 schools. The school was ranked 2nd in the magazine's 2006 rankings out of 316 schools included across the state. Schooldigger.com ranked the school 68th out of 381 public high schools statewide in its 2011 rankings (a decrease of 42 positions from the 2010 ranking) which were based on the combined percentage of students classified as proficient or above proficient on the mathematics (89.2%) and language arts literacy (97.3%) components of the High School Proficiency Assessment (HSPA).

In the 2011 "Ranking America's High Schools" issue by The Washington Post, the school was ranked 19th in New Jersey and 720th nationwide. Tenafly High School was the 2nd-highest ranked school in New Jersey in a 2007 listing by Newsweek magazine of the top 1,200 U.S. high schools .

In its 2013 report on "America's Best High Schools", The Daily Beast ranked the school 253rd in the nation among participating public high schools and 20th among schools in New Jersey. The school was ranked 198th in the nation and 16th in New Jersey on the list of "America's Best High Schools 2012" prepared by The Daily Beast / Newsweek, with rankings based primarily on graduation rate, matriculation rate for college and number of Advanced Placement / International Baccalaureate courses taken per student, with lesser factors based on average scores on the SAT / ACT, average AP/IB scores and the number of AP/IB courses available to students.

"As of 2024, SchoolDigger ranked Tenafly High School 26th out of 426 public high schools statewide, based on New Jersey Student Learning Assessment (NJSLA) proficiency data."

== Extracurricular activities ==
A clip of journalism students at the school was featured on a December 2025 episode of The Late Show with Stephen Colbert introducing Colbert's "Meanwhile" segment.

=== Marching band ===
In 2012, the Tenafly High School Marching Band came in first place for group 3A in the USBands Marching Band Competition in Fair Lawn, New Jersey. In 2022 and 2023, the Band came in first place for group 4A in the USBands New Jersey State Championships. In 2023, the band competed in the USBands National Championships for the first time and placed first in group 4A.

In October 2024, the marching band won at the USBands annual competition at Bergenfield High School in October 2024, scoring 81.700 in Group Open IV. In November 2025, the band competed in the USBands New Jersey State Championships and placed second place in group 4O.

=== Athletics ===
The Tenafly High School Tigers compete in the Big North Conference, which is comprised of public and private high schools in Bergen and Passaic counties, and was established following a reorganization of sports leagues in Northern New Jersey by the New Jersey State Interscholastic Athletic Association (NJSIAA). Before the 2010 realignment, Tenafly competed in the Bergen County Scholastic League (BCSL) American Conference, which included public and private high schools located in Bergen and Hudson counties. With 910 students in grades 10–12, the school was classified by the NJSIAA for the 2019–20 school year as Group III for most athletic competition purposes, which included schools with an enrollment of 761 to 1,058 students in that grade range. The football team competed in the Ivy White division of the North Jersey Super Football Conference, which includes 112 schools competing in 20 divisions, making it the nation's biggest football-only high school sports league. The football team was one of the 12 programs assigned to the two Ivy divisions starting in 2020, which are intended to allow weaker programs ineligible for playoff participation to compete primarily against each other. The team was promoted to the American Red division after an 8–0 record in 2020, and a 6–4 run in 2021. The school was classified by the NJSIAA as Group III North for football for 2024–2026, which included schools with 700 to 884 students. The name for the school's athletic teams is the Tigers, and its school colors are black and orange, adopted in the 1920s as a nod to those of Princeton University.

The school participates as the host school / lead agency in a joint ice hockey team with Cresskill High School. The co-op program operates under agreements scheduled to expire at the end of the 2023–24 school year.

In the annual "Turkey Bowl" game, played on Thanksgiving Day in 2025, Dumont High School beat Tenafly by a score of 28-20 to win its 11th consecutive game in the series. The game between the two teams, played 95 times, is the oldest and most-played high school football rivalry in Bergen County, and one of only two remaining Thanksgiving Day games in the county, with Tenafly leading the all-time series against Dumont 56–36–3.

The boys' cross country team won the Group III state championship three consecutive years, from 1955 to 1957.

The boys track team won the indoor relay Group III state championship in 1966, won the Group I-II title in 1967, 1968 and 1977, and won the Group II title in 1975. The program's five state group titles are tied for eighth-most in the state.

The boys track team won the Group III spring / outdoor track state championship in 1957 and the Group II title in 1967.

The 1975 boys' soccer team finished the season with a record of 18-1-2 after a scoreless tie in the playoff finals with Ewing High School made them the Group III co-champion. In 2014, the boys' soccer team won their first state sectional title in 11 years with a 4–1 win against Wayne Hills High School in the North I, Group III state sectional final.

Tenafly is noted for its tennis team, which has been coached by Anthony Zorovich. The boys' tennis team won the Group I/II state championship in 1975 (vs. Princeton High School), and won four consecutive Group II titles in 2004 (vs. Haddonfield Memorial High School), 2005 (vs. Summit High School), 2006 (vs. West Essex High School) and 2007 (vs. Rumson-Fair Haven Regional High School). The 1975 team finished the season with a record of 17-1 after defeating Chatham Borough High School 5–0 in the semifinals and moving on to defeat Princeton 3 1/2-1 1/2 in the finals win the Group I/II state title. The team won the 2006 Group II state championship, defeating Rumson-Fair Haven 3–2 in the semifinals and West Essex by 3–2 in the finals to take the title. In 2007, the team won the state sectionals defeating Dwight Morrow High School 5–0 to win the North I, Group II championship, the team's sixth consecutive sectional title. The team moved onto win the 2007 NJSIAA Group II state championship, defeating Rumson-Fair Haven 3–2 in the final match to earn their fourth consecutive Group II state championship. The 2019 team won the Group III title over West Windsor-Plainsboro High School North 4–1 in the tournament final.

The girls' tennis team won the Group II state championship in 1976 (vs. Princeton High School) and 2007 (vs. Manasquan High School); the 2007 team advanced to the finals of the Tournament of Champions, losing to Millburn High School. In 2007, the girls' tennis team took the North I, Group II state sectionals with a string of 5-0 wins over Westwood Regional High School in the quarterfinals, Newton High School in the semis and Pascack Hills High School in the finals. The win was the eighth sectional title in team history. The team took the Group II state championship with a 3½-1½ win over Haddonfield Memorial High School in the semifinals and Manasquan High School in the finals by a 3–2 score.

The girls' volleyball team won the Division B state championship in 1981 (against Park Ridge High School in the final match of the tournament) and won the Group II title in 1982 (vs. Garfield High School). The 1981 team won the inaugural NJSIAA state title, winning the Group I-II championship in two games (15-11, 16–14) against finals opponent Park Ridge. The 1982 team won the Group II title in two games (15–10 and 15–12) against Garfield.

The ice hockey team won the McMullen Cup in 2002. The team made the Public B state finals in 2012 but fell to Summit High School by a score of 2–1 in overtime.

== Administration ==
The school's principal is James O. Morrison. His administration team includes the vice principal and athletic director.

== Notable alumni ==
- Edie Adams (1927-2008), actress
- Edan Alexander (born 2003, class of 2022), American-Israeli soldier held hostage in Gaza for 584 days by Hamas after the October 7 attacks
- Josette Andrews (born 1995 née Norris, class of 2014), middle to long-distance runner
- Mark Attanasio (born 1957), businessman who is principal owner of the Milwaukee Brewers and majority shareholder of English football club Norwich City
- Paul Attanasio (born 1959, class of 1977), screenwriter and producer who was nominated for the Academy Award for Best Adapted Screenplay for Quiz Show and Donnie Brasco
- Ann Blackman (born 1946, class of 1964), author and journalist
- Neil M. Bressler, ophthalmologist who is a professor at the Johns Hopkins School of Medicine and editor-in-chief of JAMA Ophthalmology
- Matt Brown (born 1999), professional ice hockey left winger who plays for the Bakersfield Condors
- Jonathan Carney, appointed concertmaster of the Baltimore Symphony Orchestra in 2002
- Hope Davis (born 1964, class of 1982), actress
- Pierce H. Deamer Jr. (1907-1986), politician who served in the New Jersey General Assembly from 1952 to 1962 and then in the New Jersey Senate until 1966
- Tate Donovan (born 1963, class of 1981), actor
- Emin (born 1979, class of 1997), stage name of Azerbaijani-Russian singer and businessman Emin Agalarov
- Eran Ganot (born 1981, class of 1999), head coach of the Hawaii Rainbow Warriors basketball team
- Alan Geisler (1931-2009), food chemist, best known for creating the red onion condiment used as a topping on hot dogs in New York City
- Alexander Gemignani (born 1979, class of 1997), actor, starred in Les Misérables, Assassins, Sunday in the Park with George
- Alexie Gilmore (born 1976, class of 1995), actor who starred in the television series New Amsterdam
- Nakia Griffin-Stewart (born 1996), American football tight end for the Kansas City Chiefs of the NFL
- Han Seung-yeon (born 1988), actress and member of South Korean girl group Kara
- Ed Harris (born 1950, class of 1969), actor
- Jon-Erik Hexum (1957-1984), actor and model
- Jason Itzler (born 1967 as Jason Sylk), founder of NY Confidential, regular guest on The Howard Stern Show - Interviewed on CNN's Larry King Live
- Ross Levinsohn (born c. 1964), interim CEO of Yahoo!
- Eric Maskin (born 1950, class of 1968), Nobel Prize-winning economist
- Richard P. McCormick (1916-2006, class of 1933), historian and professor, who was president of the New Jersey Historical Society
- Lea Michele (born 1986, class of 2004), singer and actress who has starred in Les Misérables, Glee and Scream Queens
- Edward Miguel (born 1974; class of 1992), Professor of Environmental and Resource Economics at the University of California, Berkeley
- Barbara Pariente (born 1948, class of 1966), Chief Justice of the Florida Supreme Court from 2004 to 2006
- Adam Rothenberg (born 1975), stage and movie actor who appeared in the film Mad Money
- Steve Rothman (born 1952, class of 1970), Congressman who served from 1997 to 2013
- Peter Secchia (1937–2020), businessman who served as the United States Ambassador to Italy and San Marino from 1989 to 1993
- Michael Sorvino (born 1977, class of 1996), actor and voice actor
- John Spike (born 1951, class of 1969), art historian
- Michèle Kahn Spike (born 1951, class of 1969), historian and social activist
- Seth Stephens-Davidowitz (born 1982), data scientist, economist and author
- Trish Van Devere (born 1941), actress
- Gary Wright (1943–2023), singer best known for his song Dream Weaver
- Sofie Zamchick (born 1994, class of 2012), indie-pop singer/songwriter and actress
