= Neil M. Bressler =

American ophthalmologist

- Born: New Jersey, US
- Spouse: Susan Bloom (m. 1979)

Academic background
- Education: BS, 1978, University of Michigan; MD, 1982, Johns Hopkins School of Medicine

Academic work
- Institutions: Johns Hopkins School of Medicine; Harvard Medical School

Neil M. Bressler is an American ophthalmologist. He is the James P. Gills Professor of Ophthalmology and chief of the Retina Division at the Wilmer Eye Institute at Johns Hopkins School of Medicine and editor-in-chief of JAMA Ophthalmology.

== Early life and education ==
Bressler was born in New Jersey to father Sidney Bressler, and raised in Tenafly, New Jersey. Growing up, he played the clarinet and won the Senate Award while attending the Interlochen National Music Camp. After attending Tenafly High School as part of the class of 1974, Bressler enrolled at the University of Michigan for his Bachelor of Science degree. Upon receiving his degree, Bressler married his wife Susan (née Bloom) in a Jewish ceremony on July 8, 1979. Together, they earned their medical degrees at Johns Hopkins School of Medicine in 1982 and completed their internships and three-year residency in ophthalmology together.

== Career ==
Following his internship and residency, Bressler joined the faculty at Harvard Medical School as an instructor of ophthalmology and the Massachusetts Eye and Ear Infirmary. He then joined the Johns Hopkins School of Medicine and the Johns Hopkins Hospital's Wilmer Eye Institute in 1988. As an associate professor of ophthalmology in 1995, Bressler received an Olga Keith Wiess Scholar Award from the Research to Prevent Blindness organization to support research into age-related macular degeneration. A few years later, Bressler was the recipient of the Macula Society's Young Investigator Award as an "individual under 50 years of age whose work gives high promise of a notable advance in the clinical treatment of disorders of the eye." In 1999, Bressler was the recipient of the Heed-Gutman Award for displaying evidence of major contributions to ophthalmology, outstanding original discoveries or investigation, and long-term evidence of extraordinary and distinguished leadership service on behalf of ophthalmology. As a result of his academic accomplishments, Bressler was the inaugural recipient of the James P. Gills Professor of Ophthalmology at Johns Hopkins in 2000.

Alongside his wife, Bressler was the co-recipient of the 2008 Gertrude D. Pyron Award from the American Society of Retina Specialists for "outstanding vision scientists whose work contributes to knowledge about vitreoretinal disease." In 2013, Bressler was appointed editor-in-chief of JAMA Ophthalmology after having served on the journal's editorial board.

In 2017, Bressler co-published a study that demonstrated the ability of a form of AI known as deep learning to accurately detect age-related macular degeneration. Following the study, Bressler and his team evaluated algorithms and comparing methods before ultimately determining that low-shot deep learning does have the potential to overcome limitations imposed by a low number of training images in retinal diagnostics. He was also again named to the Ophthalmologist's Power List for 2020.
