= Alan Geisler =

American food chemist

Alan Stark Geisler (September 30, 1930 – January 6, 2009) was an American food chemist, best known for creating the red onion sauce most often used as a condiment topping on hot dogs in New York City. Specifically, the sauce, which is marketed as Sabrett's Prepared Onions, is usually served on Sabrett brand hot dogs sold by New York's many pushcart hot dog vendors.

Sabrett brand hot dogs and the red onion sauce which Geisler created are the flagship products of Marathon Enterprises, Inc. The company is headquartered in Englewood, New Jersey.

== Personal life ==
Geisler was a graduate of Tenafly High School in Tenafly, New Jersey. He received his bachelor's degree in food technology from the Massachusetts Institute of Technology. He served as an officer in the Quartermaster Corps of the US Army during the Korean War.

Geisler resided in Mahwah, New Jersey, for 45 years. He was an ardent stamp collector and dealer, and an original member of the Apple Ridge Golf and Country Club of Mahwah, NJ. An avid golfer with a 4 handicap at one time, he won the Club Championship in all four flights, and throughout his career eagled all 18 holes. He played the bagpipes with the Fairleigh Dickinson University Pipe Band and the Kearny Caledonian Pipe Band for several years, even performing in the St. Patrick Day Parade in NYC.

== Career ==
Geisler founded a company that manufactured shortenings, emulsifiers and other ingredients for the baking and baked goods industry in 1960.

One of his customers was Gregory Papalexis, who manufactured both hot dogs and hot dog buns. Papalexis's customers included hot dog street vendors, who often made a popular homemade, but time laborious, onion sauce as a topping. Papalexis asked Geisler to come up with a factory-made onion sauce for the hot dog vendors to sell at their carts in New York City.

Geisler, with input from Papalexis, created a new, mass-produced onion sauce for hot dogs. The main formula and spice blends of the sauce consisted predominantly of onions, olive oil and tomato paste, which gives the sauce its distinctive red coloring. The sauce proved to be a hit with both the street vendors, who no longer had to make their own time-consuming sauces, and hot dog consumers.

Geisler and Papalexis partnered to form their own company, called Tremont Foods, to market and make the new red onion sauce. The sauce was initially sold to New York City hot dogs vendors under the brand names Tremont Foods or House of Weenies.

Papalexis acquired Sabrett Food Products in 1989. As a result of the acquisition, Geisler's onion sauce became the only onion sauce served on Sabrett hot dogs by vendors in New York City. The red onion condiment also became available for purchase in supermarkets under the Sabrett's brand. It is marketed nationwide as "Sabrett's Prepared Onions."

As of 2009, Geisler's red onion sauce enjoys "a couple of million dollars a year in sales," according to Papalexis. Geisler's and Papalexis's original company, Tremont Foods, is currently a division of Marathon Enterprises, Inc., which owns the Sabrett trademark. (Marathon Enterprises is owned by Papalexis.) The only product made by Tremont Foods is the popular red onion sauce. The sauce is manufactured in The Bronx, but production is scheduled to shift to a new facility, in Fair Lawn, New Jersey, in 2009.

Geisler remained active with the company until his death in 2009.

== Death ==
Geisler died at his winter home in Hernando, Florida, on January 6, 2009, at the age of 78. Geisler had been suffering from a protein disorder called amyloidosis. He was survived by his wife, Jean Geisler, his daughter, Martha Geisler, his son, Glenn Geisler, his brother and a grandson.

== See also ==
- Street food
