= Michèle Kahn Spike =

American lawyer, historian, and lecturer

Michèle Kahn Spike is an American lawyer, historian, and lecturer. She graduated from Boston University School of Law in 1976 and became a member of the Bar of the State of New York in 1977, concentrating in international corporate law. From the late 1980s until 2011, she lived in Florence, Italy together with her husband, art historian John Spike.

== Biography ==
Spike grew up in Tenafly, New Jersey and attended Tenafly High School and Connecticut College.

She is known for her biography of Matilda of Tuscany, Tuscan Countess: The Life and Extraordinary Times of Matilda of Canossa, which was published in 2004. She also collaborated with John Spike on his study of Caravaggio and Mattia Preti.

Spike has been a member of the Bar of the State of New York since 1977 and during those 40 years engaged in the practice of international corporate law.

In the spring of 2015, in honor of the 900th anniversary of the death of Matilda of Canossa, Spike curated the exhibition Matilda of Canossa and the Origins of the Renaissance for the Muscarelle Museum of Art in coordination with the Marshall-Wythe School of Law at the College of William and Mary. The catalogue for that exhibition was published by the Muscarelle Museum of Art. In 2015, Spike also published An Illustrated Guide to the ‘One Hundred Churches’ of Matilda of Canossa, Countess of Tuscany (Centro Di, Florence, 2015).

In 2016, also in honor of the 900th anniversary of the death of the Countess, she curated the exhibition, Matilda di Canossa (1046-1115) La donna che mutò il corso della stori / Matilda of Canossa (1046-1115) the Woman who Changed the Course of History for the Casa Buonarroti in Florence. The catalogue, available in Italian and in English, was published by Centro Di, Florence.

As a member of the Standing Commission on Anglican and International Peace with Justice Concerns of the Episcopal Church (USA) 2003-2009, Spike participated in delegations to Palestine and Israel as well as to United Nations conferences in New York City and Amman, Jordan. Since 2005, Spike has been Chancellor to the Bishop of the Convocation of Episcopal Churches in Europe. She most recently lectured on the Rule of Law at the Jerusalem Peacebuilders Camp in Brattleboro, Vermont.
