= The Windmill (restaurant) =

Coordinates: 40.29802°N 73.979292°W

- Original location in Long Branch
- Interactive map of The Windmill

Restaurant information
- Established: 1964
- Location: 586 Ocean Blvd. (location of the first restaurant of the chain), Long Branch, New Jersey, 07740, United States

The Windmill (stylized as WindMill) is a chain of restaurants located mostly near the Jersey Shore known for its hot dogs and other fast food. The original location, a windmill-shaped building in Long Branch, New Jersey, was built and opened in 1963. Leo and Ed Levine bought the restaurant in 1976, and opened a second location in Belmar, New Jersey, three years later. George James in The New York Times writes, "Aside from Sabrett, the family-owned hot dog manufacturer based in New Jersey that makes the Windmill hot dog, the Levines, probably constitute the largest wiener dynasty in the state." The Windmill's hot dog style is a Jersey Shore flat-grilled dog.

The Windmill's Long Branch location is known for its fierce competition with nearby Max's Famous Hotdogs.
