= John Spike =

American art historian

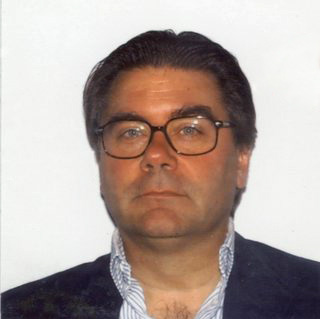
John Spike

John Thomas Spike (born November 8, 1951, in New York City) is an American art historian, curator, and author, specializing in the Italian Renaissance and Baroque periods. He is also a contemporary art critic and past director of the Florence Biennale.

Spike earned his B.A. at Wesleyan University in Connecticut and his M.A. and Ph.D. from Harvard University. His doctoral dissertation was a study of Mattia Preti, a painter of the Caravaggio school. In 1999, he was awarded honorary citizenship of Taverna, Italy, Preti's birthplace. In recognition of his studies of two Knights of St. John, Mattia Preti and Caravaggio, in 2013 Queen Elizabeth II appointed Spike to the Most Venerable Order of the Hospital of St. John of Jerusalem.

== Childhood, youth, and personal life ==
Spike grew up in New York City and Tenafly, New Jersey where he graduated from Tenafly High School. His father was the Rev. Robert W. Spike, a prominent figure in the Civil Rights Movement in the 1960s and his brother is Paul Spike, an author and the first American to be named editor of the British satirical magazine Punch. He lives in Williamsburg, Virginia with his wife Michèle Kahn Spike, lawyer and biographer of Matilda of Tuscany.

== Career as art historian ==
In the course of his career, Spike has organized art exhibitions and read lectures at numerous museums, including the Pinacoteca Nazionale, Bologna; the Galleria degli Uffizi and the Biblioteca Nazionale Centrale, Florence; the Metropolitan Museum of Art, New York; the Musée du Louvre, Paris; the National Museum of Fine Arts, Valletta, and the National Gallery of Art in Washington, D.C. He has also read lectures at Harvard, Yale and Princeton Universities, and the University of Malta. He is permanent consultant to two Italian museums, the Museo Civico di Taverna and the Museo Civico di Urbania, as well as a consultant to the Cathedral Museum of Mdina and the National Museum of Fine Arts, Valletta, Malta. In 2006 Spike was also appointed to the Board of the Muscarelle Museum of Art at the College of William & Mary, Williamsburg, Virginia. His contributions to culture and history have been recognized in Italy by the bestowal of the Premio Anthurium, 1998, the Annual Medal of the Accademia delle Belle Arti di Messina, 2001, the Premio Anassilaos, 2002 and Man of the Year by the Tuscan American Foundation, Florence, 2006.

Among the books Spike has published on the Florentine Renaissance are Masaccio (Abbeville Press 1996), and Fra Angelico (Abbeville Press, 1997), both also available in Italian and French editions. His Fra Angelico, which also appeared in a German edition by Hirmer Verlag, was named “Art Book of the Year 1997” by the Hearst newspapers in the USA. His catalogue raisonné of the paintings of Caravaggio (2001) was published in a second Revised Edition in 2010. His Young Michelangelo: The Path to the Sistine: A Biography was published in 2010 (Vendome Press; ISBN 0-86565-266-X).

In 2007, Spike was appointed to the faculty of the master's program in Sacred Art History jointly offered by the European University of Rome and the Pontifical Athenaeum Regina Apostolorum.

Between 2012 and 2019 Spike was Assistant Director and Chief Curator of the Muscarelle Museum of Art at The College of William & Mary, in Williamsburg, Virginia. During his tenure, Spike curated and authored the catalogues for several international loan exhibitions of Italian art including Michelangelo: Sacred and Profane, Masterpiece Drawings from the Casa Buonarroti and A Brush with Passion: Mattia Preti (1613-1699) as part of the "2013 Year of Italian Culture" in the United States in cooperation with the Italian foreign ministry; Caravaggio Connoisseurship: Saint Francis in Meditation and the Capitoline Fortune Teller in 2014; Leonardo da Vinci and the Idea of Beauty in 2015; and Botticelli and the Search for the Divine: Florentine Painting between the Medici and the Bonfire of the Vanities, with Alessandro Cecchi, in 2017. These exhibitions were under the auspices of the Italian Embassy in Washington, D.C. Michelangelo: Sacred and Profane, Masterpiece Drawings from the Casa Buonarroti; Leonardo da Vinci and the Idea of Beauty; and Botticelli and the Search for the Divine were also exhibited at the Museum of Fine Arts, Boston, MA. Additionally, the Leonardo exhibition under the title Leonardo da Vinci y la Idea de la Belleza drew record crowds during its exhibition at the Palacio Real, Ciudad de Mexico in 2015.

For the fall of 2017, Spike curated for the Muscarelle the exhibition, Fred Eversley: 50 Years an Artist: Light & Space & Energy, that was shown as part of the celebrations of the fiftieth anniversary of the admission of African-American students to The College of William & Mary, 1967–2017. In the spring of 2018, Spike curated for the Muscarelle the exhibition, Women with Vision: Masterworks from the Permanent Collection, that was shown as part of the celebrations of the one hundredth anniversary of the admission of women students to The College of William & Mary.

== Career as contemporary art critic ==
Spike has written essays for books and exhibition catalogues on many contemporary artists, both in New York City and in Italy.

In 1992 Spike published the biography Fairfield Porter: An American Classic, drawing upon previously unpublished correspondence to which Porter's widow, Anne, gave Spike unrestricted access. The book drew acclaim for its discussion of Porter's oeuvre as a leading figurative painter who struggled to achieve recognition in the post-war decades dominated by Abstract Expressionism.

Spike has spoken on David Hockney's theory that Old Masters of the early 16th century used optical devices at symposiums on the topic at New York University in 2001, at Optics, Optical Instruments and Painting: The Hockney-Falco Thesis Revisited in Ghent in 2003, at the Royal Society in London in 2006, and in Florence in 2007.

In 2010, Spike also oversaw the production of the Catalogue Raisonné for Richard Anuszkiewicz, the leading American artist of the Op Art movement by David Madden and Nicholas Spike.

Spike's most noteworthy contribution to contemporary art has been his involvement with the Biennale Internazionale dell'Arte Contemporanea, Florence, Italy - more commonly known in English as the Florence Biennale. He was a member of the Jury for the inaugural exhibition in December 1997, and thereafter served as director from 1998 to 2005. In 2005, Spike was also the sole juror of the Turku Biennial in Turku, Finland, as well as a member of the jury for the Triennale of India in New Delhi.

== Selected works ==
- Botticelli and the Search for the Divine. Florentine Painting Between the Medici and the Bonfires of the Vanities, with Alessandro Cecchi and additional essay by Frederick Ilchman and Victoria S. Reed, exh. cat. Muscarelle Museum of Art, Williamsburg, VA and Boston Museum of Fine Arts, Boston, MA, Centro Di Florence 2017.
- Leonardo da Vinci and the Idea of Beauty, with additional essays by David Alan Brown and Paul Joannides, exh. cat., Muscarelle Museum of Art, Williamsburg, VA and Boston Museum of Fine Arts, Boston, MA, Centro Di Florence 2015.
- A Brush with Passion Mattia Preti (1613 – 1699), Paintings from North American Collections in Honor of the 400th Anniversary of His Birth, exh cat Muscarelle Museum of Art, Williamsburg, VA, Centro Di Florence, 2013.
- Michelangelo: Sacred and Profane, Masterpiece Drawings from the Casa Buonarroti, exh. cat, Muscarelle Museum of Art, Williamsburg, VA and Boston Museum of Fine Arts, Boston, MA, Centro Di Florence, 2013.
- Young Michelangelo: The Path to the Sistine. Vendome Press, New York, 312 pp. with 60 full-color and black-and-white illustrations, 2010.
- Caravaggio. Abbeville Press, New York, 272 pp. with 153 color plates + 29 b/w ills., plus CD-ROM, 2nd revised edition, 2010.
- Mattia Preti. Catalogue Raisonné of the Paintings / Catalogo ragionato dei dipinti. [Centro Di, Firenze, per il Comune di Taverna], 454 pp. with 108 color plates + 460 b/w ills., 1999.
- Mattia Preti. I documenti / The Collected Documents. [Centro Di, Firenze per la Banca di Credito Cooperativo della Sila Piccola - Taverna], 285 pp. with 30 color plates + 120 b/w ills., 1998.
- Masaccio, Fabbri Editori, 1995, 244 pp. with 97 color plates + 96 b/w ills. (French edition: Éditions Liana Levi, Paris; American edition, 1996: Abbeville Press, New York).
- Fra Angelico, Fabbri Editori, 1996, 280 pp. with 90 color plates + 285 b/w ills. (French edition: Éditions Liana Levi, Paris; American edition, 1997: Abbeville Press, New York; German edition, 1997: Hirmer Verlag, München).
- Fairfield Porter: An American Classic, Harry N. Abrams, Inc., New York, 1992, 320 pp. with numerous color plates + b/w ills.
- A Connoisseur's Guide to the Met, with Paul Magriel, Random House, New York, 1988, 235 pp. with 100 b/w ills.
- The Age of Monarchy, The Metropolitan Museum of Art, New York, and The Franklin Mint, Japanese edition, 1987; English and French editions, 1988.
- Giuseppe Maria Crespi and the Emergence of Genre Painting in Italy, The Kimbell Art Museum, Fort Worth, Texas, 1986, 245 pp. with 52 color plates + 111 b/w ills.
- Baroque Portraiture in Italy: Works from North American Collections, The John and Mable Ringling Museum of Art, Sarasota, FL., 1984, 214 pp. with 19 col pls + 130 b/w ills.
- Italian Still Life Paintings from Three Centuries, National Academy of Design, New York, 1983, 149 pp. with 50 color plates + 87 b/w ills.
- Italian Baroque Paintings from New York Private Collections, The Art Museum, Princeton University, with Princeton University Press, 1980, 127 pp., color cover + 71 b/w ills.
