= Florence Biennale =

Art exhibition in Florence, Italy

The Biennale Internazionale Dell’Arte Contemporanea, also known as the Florence Biennale, is an art exhibition held in Florence, Italy. Since 1997 it has been held every two years in the exhibition spaces of the Fortezza da Basso, Florence.

The list of the famous participants include Marina Abramović, David Hockney, Christo & Jeanne-Claude, Gilbert & George, Anish Kapoor, El Anatsui and others.

The exhibition is held under the patronage of the UNESCO (the Italian Commission), European Parliament, Italian Ministry of Culture and Tourism, Tuscany Region, and Municipality of Florence.

== History ==
The Biennale in its current form was begun in 1997 by Piero and Pasquale Celona.

The first Art Director of the Florence Biennale was the art historian Stefano Francolini. From 1998 to 2005 the Art Director in charge was the art historian and critic John Spike. Emanuel von Lauestein Massarani, Secretary of Culture and Superintendent of Cultural Heritage of São Paulo took over the job in 2007. Stefano Francolini was made art director again in 2009 and 2011. Florentine art historian and critic Rolando Bellini was appointed in 2013 and is currently in charge.

== Awards ==
=== “Lorenzo il Magnifico” Award ===
During the Florence Biennale, an International Jury awards the “Lorenzo il Magnifico” International Award to outstanding artists across various art categories. The categories include Painting, Mixed Media, Photography, Sculpture, Video Art, Ceramic Art, Digital Art, Drawing, Calligraphy and Printmaking, showcasing a wide range of artistic talents. The award commemorates the Renaissance era under Lorenzo de’ Medici, "the Magnificent," aiming to reflect Florence's historical significance in the arts during his patronage (1449-1492). It features a medal with a relief portrait of Lorenzo de’ Medici, crafted by sculptor Mario Pachioli, symbolizing the enduring connection to Florence's rich artistic heritage.

=== “Lorenzo il Magnifico” Lifetime Achievement Award ===
The "Lorenzo il Magnifico" Lifetime Achievement Award is presented to individuals or organizations that have achieved exceptional heights in artistic excellence or have made significant contributions to culture around the world.

=== “scan.art” Visitor Award ===
The Visitor Award is presented to the three artworks that receive the highest number of scans through the scan.art digital exhibition guide which is used by visitors during their exhibition visit to receive digital information about exhibited artworks and artists.

== Criticism ==
The cost of the Florentine Biennale is borne directly by the participating artists. At the time this has given rise to criticism that the Florence Biennale is a vanity exhibition, but this changes as the artworks are judged before admission by a professional jury of leading international experts. Over the years, the Biennale has been positively assessed both quantitatively and qualitatively. Juried artists shown in the exhibition pay a participation fee between $2700-$4000.
