= Ann Blackman =

American author and biographer

- Born: Ann Towers Blackman; Englewood, New Jersey
- Occupations: Author, journalist
- Writing career
- Genre: Biography
- Website: annblackman.com

Ann Blackman is an author and a journalist. She lived in Bogota, New Jersey, until 1956 when her family moved to Tenafly, New Jersey. Blackman graduated from Tenafly High School in 1964, received an Associate of Arts degree from Colby Junior College in 1966, a diplome from the Sorbonne in 1967 and a B.A. from the University of Connecticut in 1968.

Blackman was a news correspondent for more than 30 years. She spent 16 years with Time, joining the magazine in 1985 as deputy bureau chief in the Washington bureau. She also spent three years as a foreign correspondent in Time's Moscow bureau. Before that, Blackman was a reporter for the Associated Press with assignments that included the Watergate hearings, presidential politics, the Iranian hostage crisis and the assassination attempts on Governor George Wallace and President Ronald Reagan. Blackman began her career at The Boston Globe.

Blackman's books include: Off To Save the World, How One Woman Made A Difference, published by Maine Custom Publishing (2012). She is also the author of Seasons Of Her Life, a biography of Madeleine K. Albright, the first women to become U.S. secretary of state (Scribner/Simon & Schuster, 1998); co-author of The Spy Next Door, about the secret life of FBI turncoat Robert Hanssen (Little Brown, 2002); and author of Wild Rose, A True Story, about the remarkable life of Civil War spy Rose O'Neal Greenhow, who grew up in the nation's capital in the 19th century and spied for the South during the American Civil War (Random House, 2005). Blackman has appeared on TV and radio shows including A&E Biography, Washington Week in Review, The Diane Rehm Show, Hardball with Chris Matthews, CNN, Fox Morning News, The Charlie Rose Show, Booknotes, The Hill, To the Best of Our Knowledge and The Jim Bohannon Show. She is married to Michael Putzel and lives in Washington, DC, and on the coast of Maine.

== Bibliography ==
- Blackman, Ann (1998). Seasons of Her Life: A Biography of Madeleine Korbel Albright. New York: Scribner. ISBN 0-684-84564-4.
- Blackman, Ann (2002). The Spy Next Door: The Extraordinary Secret Life of Robert Philip Hanssen. Little Brown. ISBN 0-316-71821-1.
- Blackman, Ann (2005). Wild Rose, Civil War Spy, A True Story. Random House. ISBN 978-0-8129-7045-6.
- Blackman, Ann (2011). Off to Save the World: How Julia Taft Made a Difference. Rockland, Maine: Maine Authors Publishing. ISBN 978-0-8129-7045-6.
