= Sabrett =

American brand of food products

Marathon Enterprises, Inc.
- Type: Incorporated company
- Industry: Meats and gourmet delicatessen products
- Founded: 1948
- Founder: Gregory Papalexis
- Headquarters: Englewood, New Jersey,, United States
- Area served: New York City
- Products: frankfurters, condiments
- Website: www.sabrett.com

Sabrett is a brand of meats and gourmet delicatessen products sold to the food service industry in the New York City metropolitan area. It is especially known for its hot dogs. The brand belongs to Marathon Enterprises, Inc., a private corporation headquartered in Englewood, New Jersey.

== History ==
Samuel Ogus (1891–1970), who emigrated from Latvia in 1909, started a wholesale bakery, the Star Baking Company, in 1928 with a partner, Fritz Frankel. The company was located on the Lower East Side, on East 3rd Street. Ogus was the "inside" man – running the factory and even designing much of the equipment - and Frankel was the "outside" man, dealing with the sales force and customers.

During the Great Depression, hot dogs were particularly popular because they offered an inexpensive meal. As a result, there was an increasing demand for hot dog rolls – their slogan claimed they were the "largest hot dog roll manufacturer in the world!" – which led to manufacturing hot dogs as well. They planned to call the combined company Star but the meat company Armour/Star objected, so they chose Sabre with the slogan "keen on quality." They couldn't use that name either, because there was a Sabre tuna fish company. So they decided on Sabrett, a little saber, "small and sharp". Sabrett moved the bakery and then the hot dog factory to Jersey City in the late forties.

Sabrett was known for spicy, all-beef casing kosher-style hot dogs. The ubiquitous hot dog carts were bought exclusively from Sabrett's but were independently owned. Major Sabrett customers also included Nathan's Famous in Coney Island, Papaya King, and the Stevens Company, which supplied hot dogs to area ballparks. Eventually, Sabrett expanded to supermarkets and went national.

Mr. Frankel had a daughter, Pearl, and a son, Jules. Pearl married Kurt Teitler and both Kurt and Jules Frankel joined Sabrett. Mr. Ogus had one daughter, Marilyn, who married Maurice B. "Mac" Katz (1927–1990). Mac Katz joined the business in 1958 and ran it with Mr. Ogus, Kurt Teitler and Jules Frankel. After Fritz Frankel and Jules Frankel died, Pearl and Kurt's two daughters, Ellen and Cherri, had married, and their husbands, Eric Merlin and Boyd Adelman entered the business in the 1960s. For over thirty years, Sabrett was run by the son-in-law (Mac) and the grandsons-in-law, (Eric and Boyd) of the two original founders. Hans Mueller, a German immigrant, was a sausage maker at Sabrett from 1956 to 1994, and the 'working foreman' from the mid-1970s until 1994. When Sabrett was sold to Gregory Papalexsis of Marathon Industries in 1989, only Boyd Adelman remained in management. Marathon bought rights to retain the Sabrett name which is synonymous with hot dogs in New York City.

In 2017, hundreds of tons of product was recalled when reports of small pieces of bone and cartilage being found in some of the foods were made, with one person claiming a minor mouth injury.

== Products ==
The company's flagship product is the Sabrett brand frankfurter, which is processed along with other meats, such as pastrami and salami, at the Marathon factory in the Bronx, New York. The frankfurters are sold through Sabrett branded carts on the streets of New York City and elsewhere in the metropolitan area, local supermarkets, and club locations such as BJ's, Costco, and Jetro.

Other products sold under the Sabrett brand name include condiments popular on hot dogs, such as sauerkraut, sweet relish, spicy brown mustard, and red onion sauce.

The company also sells hot dog buns.
