= Max's Bar & Grill =

Restaurant in Long Branch, New Jersey, U.S.

Coordinates: 40.2896°N 73.9825°W

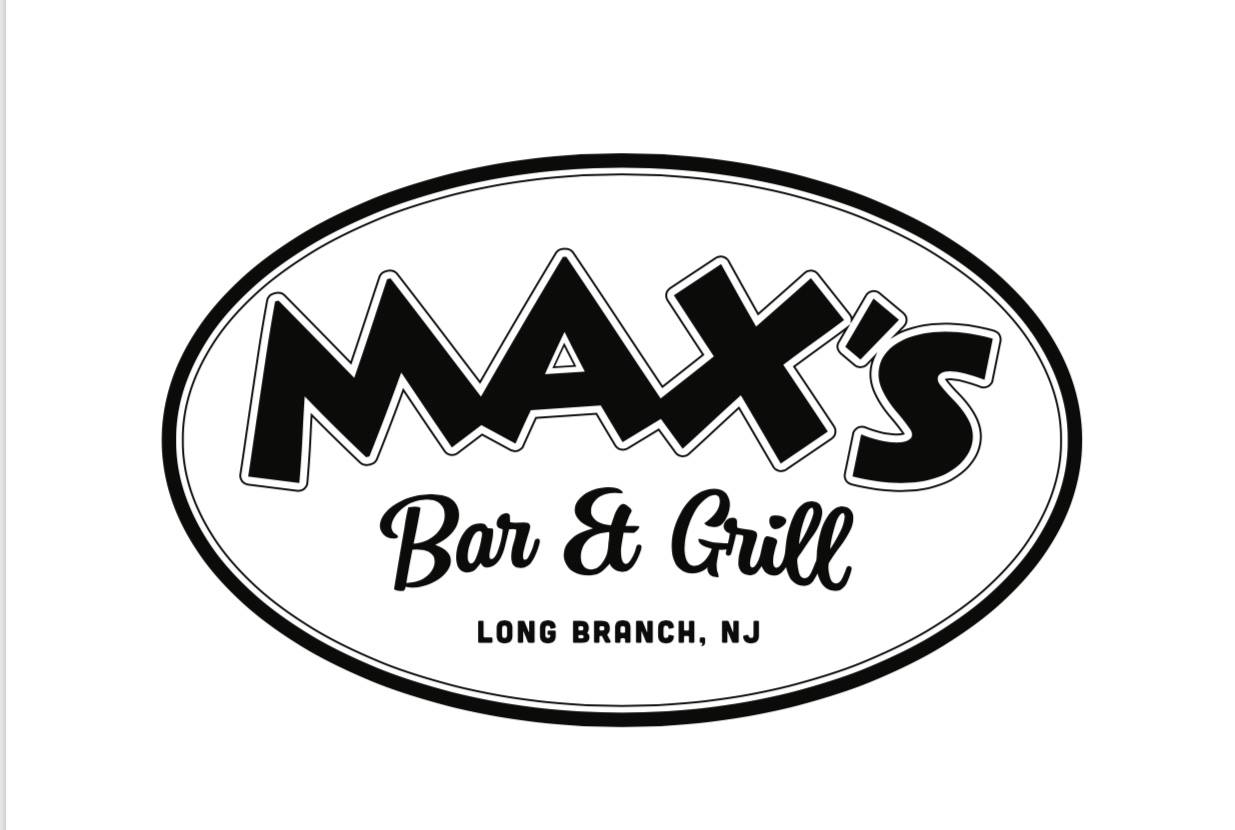
- Interactive map of Max's Bar & Grill

Restaurant information
- Established: 1928
- Location: 25 Matilda Ter., Long Branch, New Jersey, 07740, United States

Max's Bar & Grill (formerly Max's Famous Hot Dogs) is a restaurant in Long Branch, New Jersey known for its hot dogs. Max's uses quarter pound Schickhaus beef/pork dog slow cooked on a griddle. Max's hot dog style is a Jersey Shore variant of Kosher style. It is popular with local celebrities and is said to be a favorite of Bruce Springsteen and the late Cardinal John O'Connor. Among those who have visited Max’s are Jon Bon Jovi, Steven Van Zandt, Red Buttons, Gov. Brendan Byrne, Connie Francis, actors Joe Pantoliano, Joe Pesci, Nick Puccio, John Travolta, Jackie Mason, Dean Martin and singer Frankie Valli. The restaurant was also featured in season 8 of Kitchen Nightmares, which aired on December 4, 2023.

== History ==
In 1928, Max Altman opened a small restaurant on the northern end of the Long Branch pier. Max named the place after himself and did business with Milford Maybaum, who in 1950 bought him out and kept the name. Soon after Max's was purchased, Maybaum expanded the business by moving it south of the Long Branch Pier and amusements. After a short time, Maybaum became known as Mr. Max by patrons and friends. Max's developed the idea for the Jersey fresh corn on the cob and family style portions of french fries and onion rings.

Located on the Jersey shore, Max's was a seasonal business. Maybaum closed the restaurant each winter, headed south to Miami Beach and indulged in his other passion, horse racing. During that time, "Max" met Celia Levy through a mutual friend. In 1967 after a brief but intense courtship, Celia, a New York native, became Celia Maybaum. For the next 13 years, the two ran Max's together during the summers and each winter returned to Florida to race horses.

Celia Maybaum soon became known as "Mrs. Max". Over the years "Mrs. Max" has become an enduring iconic symbol of Max's Famous Hot Dogs. "Max" died in 1980 but the legacy continues as the second and third generations of the Maybaum family keep the tradition of Max's alive.

Today, Maybaum's son Robert "Bobby" Maybaum and his wife Madeline, daughters Jennifer and Michele, and grandmother Celia, continue to work at the restaurant.

In 1978 Gov. Byrne proclaimed Max’s as the finest hot dog emporium; in 1991 Joan Haberle, secretary of state, proclaimed Mrs. Max as the Queen of Hot Dogs; and in 1992 Gov. James Florio proclaimed that a trip to the Jersey Shore without a stop at Max’s in Long Branch would have been considered an incomplete visit. In 1995 Gov. Christine Todd Whitman proclaimed "Democrats and Republicans are in agreement on very few issues, but we can all concur that Max’s in Long Branch serves the most outstanding hot dogs in New Jersey."

Max's is also known for its fierce competition with The Windmill in Long Branch.
