= JAMA Ophthalmology =

Medical journal about eye disease and treatment

- Discipline: Ophthalmology
- Language: English
- Edited by: Neil M. Bressler

Publication details
- Former name: Archives of Ophthalmology
- History: 1869–present
- Publisher: American Medical Association (United States)
- Frequency: Monthly
- Open access: Hybrid
- Impact factor: 10.5 (2025)

Standard abbreviations
- ISO 4: JAMA Ophthalmol.

Indexing
- CODEN: JOAPB7
- ISSN: 2168-6165 (print); 2168-6173 (web)
- LCCN: 2012200364
- OCLC no.: 1026526463
- Archives of Ophthalmology
- ISSN: 0003-9950

Links
- Journal homepage; Online access

JAMA Ophthalmology (formerly Archives of Ophthalmology) is a monthly peer-reviewed medical journal covering all aspects of ophthalmology. The editor-in-chief is Neil M. Bressler (Johns Hopkins School of Medicine). It is published by the American Medical Association, with which it has been affiliated since 1929.

== History ==
The journal was established in New York in 1869 as the Archives of Ophthalmology and Otology, with a simultaneous German language version published in Karlsruhe, Germany, as Archiv für Augen- und Ohrenheilkunde; sometimes articles would be slightly different. The editors were Hermann Knapp (New York), who practiced both ophthalmology and otology, with greater emphasis on the eye, and the otologist Salomon Moos (Heidelberg). The journal obtained its current name in 2013.

== Naming History ==
JAMA Ophthalmology - Historical Name Changes
Title	Year	ISSN
JAMA Ophthalmology	2013-	2168-6173
Archives of Ophthalmology (1960)	1960-2012	0003-9950
A.M.A. Archives of Ophthalmology	1950-1960	0096-6339
Archives of Ophthalmology (1929)	1929-1950	0096-0326
Archives of Ophthalmology and Otology	1869-1928	0092-5624

== Abstracting and indexing ==
The journal is abstracted and indexed in:

- BIOSIS Previews
- Current Contents/Clinical Medicine
- Current Contents/Life Sciences
- Index Medicus/MEDLINE/PubMed
- Science Citation Index
- Scopus

According to Journal Citation Reports, the journal has a 2021 impact factor of 8.253, ranking it 3rd out of 61 titles in the category "Ophthalmology".

== See also ==
- List of American Medical Association journals
