= Vision science =

Scientific study of vision

Vision science is the scientific study of visual perception in humans and other organisms, and an interdisciplinarity study spanning many fields of study. Researchers of the field are sometimes referred to as vision scientists.

Vision science encompasses all studies of vision, such as how human and non-human organisms process visual information, how conscious visual perception works in humans, how to exploit visual perception for effective communication, and how artificial systems can do the same tasks. Vision science overlaps with or encompasses disciplines such as ophthalmology and optometry, neuroscience(s), psychology (particularly sensation and perception psychology, cognitive psychology, linguistics, biopsychology, psychophysics, and neuropsychology), physics (particularly optics), ethology, and computer science (particularly computer vision, artificial intelligence, and computer graphics), as well as other engineering related areas such as data visualization, user interface design, and human factors and ergonomics. Below is a list of pertinent journals and international conferences.

== Journals ==
Scientific journals exclusively or predominantly concerned with vision science include:

- Acta Ophthalmologica
- American Journal of Ophthalmology
- Annual Review of Vision Science
- Attention Perception & Psychophysics (previously Perception & Psychophysics)
- British Journal of Ophthalmology
- Clinical & Experimental Ophthalmology
- Current Opinion in Ophthalmology
- European Journal of Ophthalmology
- Experimental Eye Research
- Eye
- Graefe's Archive for Clinical and Experimental Ophthalmology
- Investigative Ophthalmology & Vision Science (IOVS)
- JAMA Ophthalmology
- Journal of Glaucoma
- Journal of Neuro-Ophthalmology
- Journal of Ophthalmology
- Journal of the Optical Society of America
- Journal of Vision
- translational vision science & technology (tvst)
- Ophthalmic and Physiological Optics (OPO)
- Ophthalmology
- Optometry and Vision Science
- Perception and i-Perception
- Progress in Retinal and Eye Research
- Seeing and Perceiving and Spatial Vision
- Survey of Ophthalmology
- Vision Research (including Clinical Vision Sciences)
- Optica

== Conferences ==
- Association for Research in Vision and Ophthalmology (ARVO)
- American Academy of Ophthalmology (AAO) Annual Meeting
- American Academy of Optometry(AAOpt) Annual Meeting
- European Conference on Visual Perception (ECVP)
- Annual Meeting of the Vision Sciences Society (VSS)
- Asia Pacific Conference on Vision (APVC)
- British Congress of Optometry and Vision Science(BCOVS)[4]
- Indian Contact Lens Education Program(ICLEP) Annual Meeting
- International Myopia Conference, International Myopia Institute
- World Congress of Optometry(WCO)[5]
- IVI International Optometry Conference[6]

== See also ==
- Brain
- Color constancy
- Color vision
- Computer vision
- Eye
- Linguistic relativity and the color naming debate
- Neuropsychology
- Neuroscience
- Ophthalmology
- Optical illusions
- Optometry
- Primary colors
- Psychophysics
- Visual cortex
- Visual neuroscience
- Visual system
