= Marilyn T. Miller =

American ophthalmologist (died 2021)

Marilyn T. Miller (died 2021) was an American pediatric ophthalmologist specializing in the diagnosis and treatment of congenital eye diseases and strabismus. She held leadership positions in her field.

== Training ==
Miller graduated from the University of Illinois School of Medicine in 1959, and subsequently completed her internship, ophthalmology residency and fellowship in pediatric ophthalmology at University of Illinois Hospital. She was a student of strabismus expert Eugene R. Folk. Miller received her B.A. in microbiology from Purdue University in 1954 and M.S. in the same subject from the University of Illinois in 1966.

== Contributions to medicine ==
Miller's contributions include descriptions of ocular findings in Möbius syndrome, Parry–Romberg syndrome, and fetal alcohol syndrome. She described associations of Duane syndrome with craniofacial abnormalities, as well as dyslexia, thalidomide toxicity, and other first-trimester anomalies. In the 1990s, her study of eye motility problems in people affected by thalidomide contributed to research into the causes of autism.

During her long career, Miller became known particularly for her interest in international ophthalmology. Along with administrative and educational work in this area, she has cared for thousands of patients around the world, and particularly in Nigeria.

Miller has been recognized for decades of care provided to children. She was the first female to serve as president of the American Association for Pediatric Ophthalmology and Strabismus, and also the first female board member of the American Academy of Ophthalmology.

Miller died on September 28, 2021, in Holland, MI.

== Offices held and honors (partial list) ==
- Director of pediatric ophthalmology and adult strabismus service in the department of ophthalmology at The University of Illinois Eye and Ear Infirmary from 1984 to 2002.
- Professor of Ophthalmology, The University of Illinois Eye and Ear Infirmary
- 1988-1994 Editor-in-Chief, Journal of the American Association for Pediatric Ophthalmology and Strabismus
- 1988-1994 Board of Directors, American Academy of Ophthalmology
- 1998-1999 President, American Association for Pediatric Ophthalmology and Strabismus
- 1990 Honor Award, 1997 Senior Honor Award, American Association for Pediatric Ophthalmology and Strabismus
- 1993 Martin J. Urist Endowed Lecture
- 1996 Frank D. Costenbader Lecturer, American Association for Pediatric Ophthalmology and Strabismus
- 2002-2003 President American Ophthalmological Society
- 2006 Marshall M. Parks Medal for Excellence in Pediatric Ophthalmology, American Association for Pediatric Ophthalmology and Strabismus
- 2007 Life Achievement Honor Award, American Academy of Ophthalmology
