= Elias Traboulsi =

Lebanese-American ophthalmologist

Elias I. Traboulsi (born May 19, 1957) is a physician in the fields of ophthalmic genetics and pediatric ophthalmology.

== Early life ==
Elias Traboulsi was born May 19, 1957, in Beirut, Lebanon, to Iskandar and Renée Traboulsi. Dr. Traboulsi earned a bachelor's degree in Science in 1977 and a Doctorate in Medicine in 1982 at the American University of Beirut.

== Professional career ==
Traboulsi completed a residency in ophthalmology at the American University of Beirut Medical Center in 1985. He then moved to the United States, to complete a fellowship in ophthalmic genetics at the Wilmer Ophthalmological Institute of Johns Hopkins Hospital, Baltimore, Maryland. Traboulsi continued his training with a residency in ophthalmology at Georgetown University Medical Center and a fellowship in pediatric ophthalmology and strabismus at Children's National Medical Center, both in Washington, D.C.

=== Positions ===
Following a year as chief resident in ophthalmology at Georgetown University Medical Center, Traboulsi joined the faculty at The Johns Hopkins Hospital, where he served as associate professor of ophthalmology from 1990 to 1997. He additionally was named as chairman of the Department of Ophthalmology at Johns Hopkins Bayview Medical Center 1995–1997.

In 1997, Traboulsi left Johns Hopkins to join the faculty at, Cleveland Clinic, Cleveland, Ohio, as head of the Department of Pediatric Ophthalmology and Strabismus and director of the Center for Genetic Eye Diseases, where he has worked since. He was director of the Cole Eye Institute fellowship program in Pediatric Ophthalmology and Strabismus 1997–2009, and has been the Cole Eye Institute residency program director since 2001. He was appointed director of the Graduate Medical Education and vice-chairman of the Cleveland Clinic Education Institute in 2005.

Traboulsi has also been a professor of ophthalmology at the Cleveland Clinic Lerner College of Medicine of Case Western Reserve University since 2006.

Additional positions include:

- Past president (1998–2004), and current executive vice president (2005–present), International Society for Genetic Eye Disease and Retinoblastoma
- Editor-in-chief, Ophthalmic Genetics
- Past and present editorial board member of peer-reviewed journals, including American Journal of Ophthalmology, Journal of AAPOS, Middle East Journal of Ophthalmology, EyeNet Magazine, Canadian Journal of Ophthalmology, and British Journal of Ophthalmology
- Director, Vision First Program: This is privately funded program for vision screening for detection of amblyopia and other eye disease of children in Cleveland Public Schools.

=== Awards ===
His honors include:

- Marshall M. Parks Fellowship Award, Costenbader Society, 1989–1990
- Honor Award, The American Academy of Ophthalmology, 1995
- Clinician Scientist Award, The Cleveland Clinic Eye Institute, 1998
- Honor Award, The American Association for Pediatric Ophthalmology & Strabismus, 2002
- Elected to the American Ophthalmological Society, May 2004. Thesis title: "Congenital Abnormalities of Cranial Nerve Development: Overview, Molecular Mechanisms and Further Evidence of Heterogeneity and Complexity of Syndromes with Congenital Limitation of Eye Movements".
- Recipient of the Sandy and Tom Trudell Award for the Study of Retinal Degenerative Disease, 2004
- Senior Honor Award, American Academy of Ophthalmology, 2005
- Marshall M. Parks Lectureship, American Academy of Ophthalmology, 2008
- Great Ormond Street Hospital Gold Medal Visiting professor, London, England, 2009
- Castle Connolly America's Top Doctors 2002–2010
- Franceschetti Lectureship, International Society for Genetic Eye Diseases and Retinoblastoma, Bangalore, India 2011

=== Scientific contributions and professional legacy ===
Traboulsi has authored the books Genetic Diseases of the Eye (Oxford Press, First Ed. 1999) and A Compendium of Inherited Disorders and the Eye (Oxford Press, 2005). He has worked as principal investigator on a number of studies focused on determination and description of the molecular genetics and clinical manifestations of ocular disorders.
