= Bruce M. Zagelbaum =

American ophthalmologist

Bruce Mitchel Zagelbaum is an American ophthalmologist specializing in cornea and external disease, laser vision correction, eye trauma, and sports ophthalmology. He authored the textbook Sports Ophthalmology, and was the principal investigator in eye injury studies involving players in Major League Baseball and in the National Basketball Association. He is an associate clinical professor of ophthalmology at Hofstra North Shore - LIJ School of Medicine and North Shore University Hospital where he is an attending physician.

== Early life and education ==
Zagelbaum grew up in Queens. He graduated from Queens College of the City University of New York with a B.A. in biology. He received his medical degree from the Chicago Medical School in 1988. Zagelbaum completed his residency training at Albert Einstein College of Medicine in 1992. He completed advanced fellowship training in anterior segment diseases and surgery, including cataracts, laser vision correction (LASIK), eye trauma, and corneal transplants at North Shore University Hospital / Cornell University Medical College in 1993.

== Career ==
In 1994, Zagelbaum became a clinical instructor in the Department of Ophthalmology at Cornell University School of Medicine and North Shore University Hospital. By 1997 he was an assistant clinical professor at New York University School of Medicine and North Shore University Hospital, where by 2003 he became an associate professor. He founded New York Ophthalmology, P.C., in Long Island, New York.

Zagelbaum's research during these years focused on sports-related eye injuries, and he published and co-published a number of papers on this subject. As a result, he was asked to serve as the team ophthalmologist for the New York Mets, the New York Jets and the New York Dragons. He has served as an ophthalmology consultant for the U.S. Tennis Open, Flushing New York, and St. John University's Queen's campus Department of Athletics. He is also the ophthalmology consultant to the National Football League and the team ophthalmologist for the New York Islanders.

A number of news sources have quoted Zagelbaum's views on sports related injuries, protective eyewear, and refractive surgery, and interviewed him about his role as a team ophthalmologist, and his studies of eye injuries in major league baseball and professional basketball.

Zagelbaum sat on the editorial board and was a reviewer for The Physician and Sportsmedicine journal. He was also a reviewer for the Journal of Pediatric Ophthalmology and Strabismus. He is a diplomate of the American Board of Ophthalmology and a fellow of the American Academy of Ophthalmology and the American College of Surgeons. Zagelbaum served on the medical committee for the Association of Boxing Commissions for mixed martial arts and boxing. He is an Honorary Police Surgeon with the New York Police Dept (NYPD) since 2014.

== Awards ==
Zagelbaum has been presented with the American Medical Association Physician's Recognition Award, the American Academy of Ophthalmology Lifetime Education Award, and the American Academy of Ophthalmology Honor Award.

== Publications ==
Zagelbaum has co-published a number of studies on the subject of sports injuries to the eye in the New England Journal of Medicine and Archives of Ophthalmology.

=== Textbooks ===
- Zagelbaum, B. Sports Ophthalmology. Cambridge, Mass: Blackwell Scientific. Published: 1996.
- Hersh, P., Zagelbaum, B., and Cremens, S. Ophthalmic Surgical Procedures. Thieme Medical Publishing Co. Published: 2009.
- Zagelbaum, B. Sports Ophthalmology. 2nd Edition. In Progress: 2013.

=== Textbook chapters ===
- Hersh, P., Zagelbaum, B., Kenyon, K., and Shingleton, B., "Anterior Segment Ocular Trauma". In Tasman, W. (ed.): Duane's Clinical Ophthalmology. Philadelphia: J.B. Lippincott. 1994:6(39);1-19. Also in updated versions published in 2008 and 2011.
- Zagelbaum, B., Darienzo, P., and Hersh, P. Cornea and Anterior Segment Trauma Pre-Test Board Review. McGraw-Hill. Published: Oct., 1996.
- Hersh, P., Zagelbaum, B., Shingleton, B., and Kenyon, K. Anterior Segment Trauma. In Principles and Practice of Ophthalmology, Albert and Jakobiec (eds.). 1999. Also in updated version in 2008.
