= Henry Metz =

Henry S. Metz is an American pediatric ophthalmologist. He was the CEO of the Smith-Kettlewell Institute in San Francisco from 2003 to 2008. Much of his early research concerned eye movements and strabismus, including saccadic velocity measurements and use of botulinum toxin.

== Education and career ==
After completed his undergraduate degree from Columbia College, Columbia University, Metz received his medical degree from SUNY and MBA from the University of Rochester. He did a medical internship at the Jewish Hospital of Brooklyn, followed by an ophthalmology residency at the University of Rochester School of Medicine and strabismus fellowship at the Smith-Kettlewell Eye Research Institute. His fellowship preceptor was the renowned strabismologist Arthur Jampolsky. During the late 1990s Metz maintained private practice in Rochester and at The Eye Specialists Center in Illinois, and served as visiting professor at The University of Illinois Eye and Ear Infirmary until his appointment at Smith-Kettlewell in 2003.

== Honors and offices held ==
- 1978–1993, Chair of the Department of Ophthalmology at the University of Rochester Eye Institute
- Editor-in-chief of the Journal of Pediatric Ophthalmology and Strabismus (JPOS), 1982–1988
- 1990–1991, President of the American Association for Pediatric Ophthalmology and Strabismus
- 1993, Frank D. Costenbader lecturer, AAPOS
- Medical advisory board, Better Vision for Children Foundation

=== Published works (partial list) ===
- Metz HS, Rose S, Burkat C (2004). "Late-onset progressive strabismus associated with a hydrogel scleral buckle". J AAPOS. 8 (1): 72–3. doi:10.1016/j.jaapos.2003.09.014. PMID 14970805.
- Metz HS (2003). "Light and the circadian clock". J AAPOS. 7 (4): 229–30. doi:10.1016/S1091-8531(03)00119-8. PMID 12917606.
- Metz HS (2004). "20th annual Frank Costenbader Lecture: Muscle transposition surgery". J Ped Oph Strabismus. 30 (6): 346–53. doi:10.3928/0191-3913-19931101-03. PMID 8120738.
- Metz HS, Dickey CF (1991). "Treatment of unilateral acute sixth-nerve palsy with botulinum toxin". Am J Ophthalmol. 112 (4): 381–4. doi:10.1016/s0002-9394(14)76243-9. PMID 1928238.
- Metz HS (2004). "Ocular tension and vitreous loss in cataract extraction". Am J Ophthalmol. 64 (2): 309–12. doi:10.1016/0002-9394(67)92530-5. PMID 6036288.
- Metz HS (1988). "The use of vertical offsets with horizontal strabismus surgery". Ophthalmology. 95 (8): 1094–7. doi:10.1016/s0161-6420(88)33055-1. PMID 3231447.
- Metz HS (1976). "Saccadic velocity measurements in internuclear ophthalmoplegia". Am J Ophthalmol. 81 (3): 296–9. doi:10.1016/0002-9394(76)90243-9. PMID 1258953.
- Metz HS, Livingston A, Zigman S, Lerman S (1965). "Studies on the metabolism of the regenerating rabbit lens". Arch Ophthalmol. 74 (2): 244–247. doi:10.1001/archopht.1965.00970040246023. PMID 14318503.

== See also ==
- American Association for Pediatric Ophthalmology and Strabismus
