= Stephen McLeod =

American physician

Stephen McLeod is an American ophthalmologist and professor of ophthalmology at the University of California, San Francisco. He has been CEO of the American Academy of Ophthalmology since 2022. He was previously editor in chief of the Academy's journal Ophthalmology.

== Education and career ==
McLeod went to high school in Jamaica. He immigrated to the US and received an M.D. from the Johns Hopkins University School of Medicine. He completed an ophthalmology residency at the Illinois Eye and Ear Infirmary, University of Illinois in Chicago.
