= Eugene R. Folk =

American ophthalmologist (1924–2003)

Gene Folk (September 7, 1924 - February 28, 2003) was an American ophthalmologist who specialized in the diagnosis and treatment of strabismus. A charter member of the American Association for Pediatric Ophthalmology and Strabismus, he later served as President of this organization. With Martin Urist, Folk helped found the "Chicago" school of strabismus, whose ideas competed with and stimulated those of Marshall M. Parks, Arthur Jampolsky, and other prominent strabismologists. During the 1950s and 1960s, Urist and Knapp's contributions led to a much improved understanding of so-called A and V "pattern" strabismus, where the amplitude of deviation varies in up- and downgaze.

== Early life ==
Eugene R. Folk was born on September 7, 1924, to Max Lyon and Martha Rubin Folk. Folk graduated from the University of Chicago Laboratory School in 1940, and subsequently served as second lieutenant during World War II

== Marriage and children ==
Folk is survived by his wife, Meg Folk, three daughters, and two granddaughters.

== Offices held and honors ==
- President Chicago Ophthalmologic Society, 1973
- President American Association for Pediatric Ophthalmology and Strabismus, 1984–5
- Frank D. Costenbader lecturer, AAPOS, 1995
- Professor, University of Illinois College of Medicine, Illinois Eye and Ear Infirmary, Department of Ophthalmology
- Faculty / staff member, Loyola Stritch School of Medicine Department of Ophthalmology, Weiss Memorial Hospital, Skokie Valley Hospital, and John H. Stroger, Jr. Hospital of Cook County

== Posthumous honor ==
The first Eugene R. Folk MD Endowed Lecture was presented by Burton J. Kushner, MD at the American Academy of Ophthalmology Annual Meeting on October 15, 2005. Dr. Sherwin J. Isenberg gave the second Folk Lecture on September 26, 2006, at The University of Illinois Eye and Ear Infirmary. The third Folk lecturer was David Guyton, who spoke on strabismus on September 19, 2008.

== Published works (partial list) ==
- Folk, ER: Treatment of strabismus 1965—ISBN B0007ENHYU Publisher: C.C. Thomas
- Folk ER (1997). "Costenbader Lecture: A and V syndrome: a historical perspective". J Pediatr Ophthalmol Strabismus. 34 (3): 154–8. doi:10.3928/0191-3913-19970501-05. PMID 9168419.
- Kaufman LM, Folk ER, Miller MT, Tessler HH (1989). "Necrotizing scleritis following strabismus surgery for thyroid ophthalmopathy". J Pediatr Ophthalmol Strabismus. 26 (5): 236–8. doi:10.3928/0191-3913-19890901-07. PMID 2795412.
- Folk ER, Miller MT, Chapman L (1983). "Consecutive exotropia following surgery". Br J Ophthalmol. 67 (8): 546–8. doi:10.1136/bjo.67.8.546. PMC 1040117. PMID 6871147.
- Greenwald MD, Folk ER (1983). "Afferent pupillary defects in amblyopia". J Pediatr Ophthalmol Strabismus. 20 (2): 63–7. doi:10.3928/0191-3913-19830301-06. PMID 6864419.
- Folk ER (1979). "Intermittent congenital esotropia". Ophthalmology. 86 (12): 2107–11. doi:10.1016/s0161-6420(79)35303-9. PMID 555798.
- Mittelman D, Folk ER (1979). "The surgical management of overcorrected esotropia". J Pediatr Ophthalmol Strabismus. 16 (3): 156–9. doi:10.3928/0191-3913-19790501-05. PMID 458523.
- Folk ER (1975). "Indications for weakening the inferior oblique muscle". Am Orthopt J. 25: 131–4. doi:10.1080/0065955X.1975.11982384. PMID 1200459.
- Folk ER (1971). "Practical considerations in amblyopia therapy". Int Ophthalmol Clin. 11 (4): 253–6. doi:10.1097/00004397-197101140-00040. PMID 5155075.
- Folk ER (1956). "Surgical results in intermittent exotropia". Arch Ophthalmol. 55 (4): 767–9. doi:10.1001/archopht.1956.00930030488004. PMID 13312743.
- Folk ER, Whelchel MC (1955). "The effect of the correction of refractive errors on nonparalytic esotropia". Am J Ophthalmol. 40 (2): 232–6. doi:10.1016/0002-9394(55)91633-0. PMID 13238542.

== See also ==
- Pediatric ophthalmology
