= Jane D. Kivlin =

American ophthalmologist

Jane Kivlin is an American ophthalmologist who specializes in the diagnosis and treatment of pediatrics genetics and strabismus. A longstanding member of the American Association for Pediatric Ophthalmology and Strabismus, she served as President of this organization. She is well known for her contributions to the understanding of amblyopia and the ophthalmologic manifestations of shaken baby syndrome.

== Education and training ==
MD, Johns Hopkins University School of Medicine Internship, Medical Center Hospital of Vermont Residency in ophthalmology, The Wilmer Ophthalmological Institute at Johns Hopkins Hospital Fellowship in pediatric ophthalmology, University of Miami Fellowship in ophthalmic genetics, Johns Hopkins University

== Offices held and honors ==
- President American Association for Pediatric Ophthalmology and Strabismus, 2001-2002
- Specialty Fellow, American Academy of Pediatrics
- Member, International Strabismological Association
- Member, Program Advisory Board, American Academy of Ophthalmology
- Honor Award, American Academy of Ophthalmology
- Honor Award, American Association for Pediatric Ophthalmology and Strabismus
- Professor, Medical College of Wisconsin

== Published works (partial list) ==
- Kivlin, JD. A 12-year ophthalmologic experience with the shaken baby syndrome at a regional children's hospital. Tr Am Ophth Soc XCVII:545-581, 1999.
- Kivlin JD., Simons KB., Lazoritz S., Ruttum MS., Shaken baby syndrome. Ophthalmology 107:1246-1254, 2000.
- Quinn GE., Dobson, V., Siatkowski RM., Hardy RJ., Kivlin JD., Palmer EA., Phelps DL., Repka MX., Summers CG.,

Tung B., Chan W., Does cryotherapy affect refractive error? Ophthalmology 108:343-347, 2001.

- Bleyl SB, Kivlin JD, et al. (2007). "Brachymesomelic dysplasia with Peters anomaly of the eye results from disruptions of the X chromosome near the SHOX and SOX3 genes". J Pediatr Ophthalmol Strabismus. 143 (23): 2785–2795. doi:10.1002/ajmg.a.32036. PMID 17994562. S2CID 12510136.
- Ganes A, Stephens D, Kivlin JD, Levin AV (2007). "Retinal and subdural haemorrhages from minor falls?". Br J Ophthalmol. 91 (3): 396–397. doi:10.1136/bjo.2006.099481. PMC 1857666. PMID 17322469.
- Kivlin JD (2001). "Manifestations of the shaken baby syndrome". Curr Opin Ophthalmol. 12 (3): 158–163. doi:10.1097/00055735-200106000-00002. PMID 11389339. S2CID 25232315.

== See also ==
- pediatric ophthalmology
- shaken baby syndrome
