= Burton J. Kushner =

American pediatric ophthalmologist

Burt Kushner is an American pediatric ophthalmologist specializing in the diagnosis and treatment of strabismus. Kushner's contributions include demonstration of improved visual fields of patients following strabismus surgery, elucidation of torsional contribution to patients with diplopia, corticosteroid treatment of periocular capillary hemangioma, and novel hypotheses on the mechanism of "overacting" extraocular muscles.

== Training ==
Kushner graduated from the Northwestern University School of Medicine in 1969, and subsequently completed his internship at Evanston Hospital, ophthalmology residency at University of Wisconsin–Madison Hospital and fellowship in pediatric ophthalmology at Bascom Palmer Eye Institute.

== Offices held and honors ==
- Director of pediatric ophthalmology and adult strabismus service in the department of ophthalmology at University of Wisconsin–Madison Medical School, Madison, Wisconsin.
- John W. and Helen Doolittle Professor, University of Wisconsin–Madison Medical School
- Founding Editor-in-Chief, Journal of AAPOS
- 1992 Heed Foundation Award
- 1999 Senior Honor Award, American Association for Pediatric Ophthalmology and Strabismus
- 2005 Alfred W. Bressler Prize in Vision Science, awarded by The Jewish Guild for the Blind
- Dr. Kushner presented the first Eugene R. Folk MD Endowed Lecture at the American Academy of Ophthalmology Annual Meeting on October 15, 2005.

== Published works (partial list) ==
- Merriam SW, Kushner BJ (2007). "An investigation into the mechanisms causing antipodean strabismus". J AAPOS. 11 (3): 249–53. doi:10.1016/j.jaapos.2006.10.022. PMID 17360204.
- Kushner BJ (2006). "How do recessions and resections of extraocular muscles work?". J AAPOS. 10 (4): 291–2. doi:10.1016/j.jaapos.2006.06.001. PMID 16935224.
- Kushner BJ; Miller, MT; Chapman, L (2006). "PRK and amblyopia". Ophthalmology. 113 (6): 1063–4, author reply 1064-5. doi:10.1016/j.ophtha.2006.02.033. PMID 16751052.
- Kushner BJ (2006). "Multiple mechanisms of extraocular muscle 'overaction'". Arch Ophthalmol. 124 (5): 680–8. doi:10.1001/archopht.124.5.680. PMID 16682590.
- Steele AL, Bradfield YS, Kushner BJ, France TD, Struck MC, Gangnon RE (2006). "Successful treatment of anisometropic amblyopia with spectacles alone". J AAPOS. 10 (1): 37–43. doi:10.1016/j.jaapos.2005.08.003. PMID 16527678.
- Kushner BJ (2005). "The treatment of convergence insufficiency". Arch Ophthalmol. 123 (1): 100–1. doi:10.1001/archopht.123.1.100. PMID 15642819.
- Kushner BJ (2004). "Ocular torsion: rotations around the 'WHY' axis". J AAPOS. 8 (1): 1–12. doi:10.1016/j.jaapos.2003.09.004. PMID 14970791.
- Kushner BJ, Kowal L (2003). "Diplopia after refractive surgery: occurrence and prevention". Arch Ophthalmol. 121 (3): 351–21. doi:10.1001/archopht.121.3.315. PMID 12617699.
- Kushner BJ (2002). "Intractable diplopia after strabismus surgery in adults". Arch Ophthalmol. 120 (11): 1498–504. doi:10.1001/archopht.120.11.1498. PMID 12427063.
- Kushner BJ (2002). "Atropine vs patching for treatment of amblyopia in children". JAMA. 287 (16): 2145–6. doi:10.1001/jama.287.16.2145. PMID 11977238.

== See also ==
- pediatric ophthalmology
