= George Bartley (editor) =

American ophthalmologist and journal editor

George B. Bartley is an American eye surgeon and former editor-in-chief of Ophthalmology, a journal in ophthalmology and visual sciences. He is the twelfth ophthalmologist in 108 years to serve as Chief Executive Officer of the American Board of Ophthalmology, the oldest medical specialty certification board in the United States. Bartley is also the Louis and Evelyn Krueger Professor of Ophthalmology at the Mayo Clinic in Rochester, Minnesota. In 2020, the American Academy of Ophthalmology awarded Bartley the Laureate Recognition Award for exceptional scientific and leadership contributions to ophthalmology.

== Education ==
Bartley earned a Bachelor of Arts from Miami University in 1978 and a Doctor of Medicine degree from the Ohio State University College of Medicine in 1981. After internship at Riverside Methodist Hospital in Columbus, Ohio, he completed residency training in ophthalmology at the Mayo Clinic and subspecialty training in ophthalmic plastic and orbital surgery at Wright State University under John D. Bullock, a cataract surgeon and ophthalmic plastic surgeon.

== Medical career ==
Bartley joined the Department of Ophthalmology at Mayo Clinic in 1986 and was appointed Department Chair in 1992. He served in that role until 2001 when he was elected to the Mayo Clinic Board of Governors. The following year, Bartley was appointed chief executive officer of Mayo's operations in Florida. He resumed his surgical practice in Rochester in 2009 while serving as Chair of the Doctors Mayo Society and Medical Director for Alumni Philanthropy.

Bartley has served as the editor-in-chief of Ophthalmic Plastic and Reconstructive Surgery, Senior Associate Editor of the American Journal of Ophthalmology, and as an editorial board member of Archives of Ophthalmology. He was editor-in-chief of the journal Ophthalmology from 2012 to 2017.

Bartley is a former President of the American Ophthalmological Society, Trustee of the American Academy of Ophthalmology, President of the Cogan Ophthalmic History Society, and Chair of the Doctors Mayo Society. He was previously on the board of directors of the Minnesota Academy of Ophthalmology. He currently serves on the Foundation Advisory Board of the American Academy of Ophthalmology and the Board of Directors of the American Board of Medical Specialties.
