= Abbas Bagheri Lotfabad =

Iranian ophthalmologist, academic, and researcher

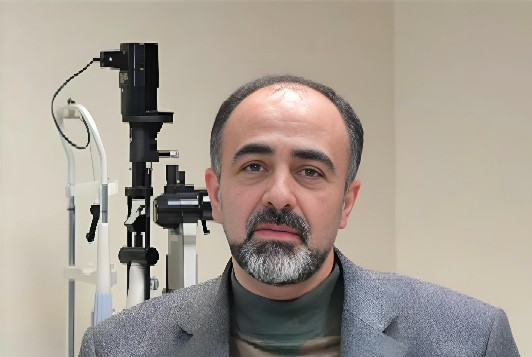
- Born: April 10, 1965; Masjed Soleyman
- Died: May 23, 2022 (aged 57); Tehran, Iran
- Awards: Excellence in Ophthalmology Award (2013)
- Scientific career
- Fields: Ophthalmology
- Workplaces: Professor at Shahid Beheshti University of Medical Sciences

Abbas Bagheri Lotfabad (Persian: عباس باقری لطف‌آباد; April 10, 1965 – May 23, 2022) was an Iranian ophthalmologist, academic, and researcher specializing in pediatric ophthalmology, strabismus, and oculoplastic surgery. He served as a professor at Shahid Beheshti University of Medical Sciences and was instrumental in advancing ophthalmic education and clinical practice in Iran.

== Early life and education ==
Bagheri was born on April 10, 1965, in Masjed Soleyman, Iran. He completed his primary and secondary education in Tehran. In 1983, he was admitted to the medical program at Shahid Beheshti University of Medical Sciences, graduating with distinction in 1990. He pursued a residency in ophthalmology at the same institution, completing it in 1994. Subsequently, he undertook a fellowship in strabismus and oculoplastic surgery at Labbafinejad Medical Center. In 2001, Bagheri completed three advanced fellowships at the Wilmer Eye Institute of Johns Hopkins University, focusing on pediatric ophthalmology, optics and refraction, and oculoplastic surgery.

== Career ==
Bagheri served as a professor of ophthalmology at Shahid Beheshti University of Medical Sciences from 2010 until his passing in 2022. He was instrumental in establishing the Optics and Refraction Department at Labbafinejad Medical Center. His research led to the development of innovative surgical techniques for treating conditions such as ptosis. He authored over 139 articles in Persian-language journals and more than 50 articles in international journals. His scholarly work has been cited over 2,900 times (as of late 2022/early 2023 data), and he had an h-index of 29. Bagheri also contributed to or authored ten significant books in ophthalmology. Examples include Strabismus Surgery: A Guide to Advanced Techniques (2023), The Five Senses and Beyond: The Encyclopedia of Perception (2016), and contributions to Surgical Ophthalmic Oncology (2019). His work has also been referenced in major texts such as Smith and Nesi's Ophthalmic Plastic and Reconstructive Surgery and Ocular Tissue Engineering.

== Honors and recognition ==
- In 2013, Bagheri received the inaugural "Excellence in Ophthalmology Award" in Iran for his contributions to education and research in strabismus and pediatric ophthalmology.
- His book "Geometric Optics" was recognized as the best ophthalmology book at the Professor Mohammad Gholi Shams Festival in 2019.
- He was a selected researcher at the Eighth Research Festival of Shahid Beheshti University of Medical Sciences in 2007.
- Bagheri received the third-place award in clinical and surgical sciences at the 13th Razi Medical Sciences Research Festival in 2007.
- His book "Optics and Refraction" was chosen as the selected book of the year at Shahid Beheshti University of Medical Sciences in 2004.

== Professional affiliations ==
- Professor of Ophthalmology, Shahid Beheshti University of Medical Sciences (2010–2022)
- Member, Iranian Board of Ophthalmology (since 2009)
- Reviewer for journals including Clinical Ophthalmology, Journal of Ophthalmic & Vision Research, Journal of AAPOS (JAAPOS), and Ophthalmology
- Member, Editorial Board, Journal of Ophthalmic & Vision Research
- Member, Committee on Medical Education Reforms (since 2004)

== Death ==
In 2011, Bagheri was diagnosed with advanced lung cancer and was given a prognosis of six months. Defying expectations, he continued his professional activities and managed the disease for over a decade. After multiple recurrences, he died on May 23, 2022, at the age of 57, at his home in Tehran. The Iranian Minister of Health described him as a "distinguished scientist and a dedicated and devoted physician" in a condolence message.
