= Traboulsi =

Traboulsi is a surname. Notable people with the surname include:

- Elias Traboulsi (born 1957), Lebanese ophtalmologist
- Izzat Traboulsi (1913–2000), Syrian politician, economist, banker, and writer
- Katya Traboulsi (born 1960), Lebanese artist
- Mohamad Traboulsi (1950–2002), Lebanese weightlifter and firefighter
- Sleiman Traboulsi (died 2021), Lebanese politician and magistrate
- Yasmina Traboulsi (born 1975), French writer
