= Gholam A. Peyman =

Iranian-American ophthalmologist and retina surgeon known for inventing LASIK eye surgery

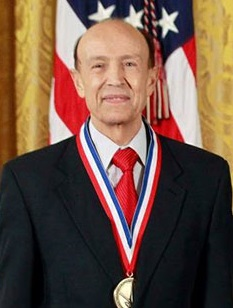
- Born: Gholam Ali Peyman; 1 January 1937 (age 89); Shiraz, Iran
- Education: University of Freiburg; University of Essen
- Known for: Inventor of LASIK
- Awards: National Medal of Technology and Innovation (2012)
- Scientific career
- Fields: Ophthalmology, Engineering
- Workplaces: Professor of Basic Medical Sciences at the University of Arizona, Phoenix & Optical Sciences at University of Arizona Tucson, Arizona; Emeritus Professor of Ophthalmology, Tulane University

Gholam A. Peyman (born 1 January 1937) is an Iranian American ophthalmologist, retina surgeon, and inventor. He is best known for his invention of LASIK eye surgery, a vision correction procedure designed to allow people to see clearly without glasses. He was awarded the first US patent for the procedure in 1989.

== Life and career ==
Peyman was born in Shiraz, Iran. At the age of 19, he moved to Germany to begin his medical studies. He received his MD at the University of Freiburg in 1962. He completed his internship at St. Johannes Hospital in Duisburg, Germany in 1964 and at Passaic General Hospital in Passaic, New Jersey in 1965. Peyman completed his residency in ophthalmology and a retina fellowship at the University of Essen, Essen Germany, in 1969 and an additional postdoctoral fellowship in retina at the Jules Stein Eye Institute, UCLA School of Medicine in Los Angeles in 1971. Peyman held the position of assistant professor of ophthalmology at the UCLA School of Medicine from 1971 and served as associate professor and then professor of ophthalmology and ocular oncology at the Illinois Eye and Ear Infirmary, University of Illinois at Chicago during 1971–1987.

Peyman held a joint appointment at the School of Medicine and also at the Neuroscience Center of Excellence at the Louisiana State University Medical University Medical Center in New Orleans during 1987–2000. During 1998-2000 Peyman held the Prince Abdul Aziz Bin Ahmed Bin Abdul Aziz Al Saud Chair in Retinal Diseases. During 2000–2006, Peyman served as professor of ophthalmology, ocular oncology and co-director, Vitreo-Retinal Service, Tulane University School of Medicine in New Orleans.

During 2006–2007, he was professor of ophthalmology at the University of Arizona, Tucson, with a cross appointment at University of Arizona College of Optical Sciences. He has been emeritus professor of ophthalmology at Tulane University since 2009.

Peyman is currently professor of basic medical sciences at the University of Arizona College of Medicine – Phoenix & Optical engineering at the University of Arizona in Tucson. Peyman was awarded in 2013 an honoree doctorate degree from the National University of Cordoba in Argentina.

== The Invention of LASIK surgery and its improvements ==
At the Illinois Eye and Ear Infirmary, Peyman, because of his interest in the effects of lasers on tissues in the eye, began evaluating the potential use of a CO_{2} laser to modify corneal refraction in rabbits. No prior study had existed on this concept. The laser was applied to the surface of the cornea using different patterns. This laser created significant scarring. His conclusions at that time were: 1) one has to wait for the development of an ablative laser and 2) one should not ablate the surface of the cornea but, instead, the ablation should take place under a flap in order to prevent scarring, pain and other undesirable sequelae. Peyman published the first article on this subject in 1980.

In late 1982, he read an article from IBM Laboratories, published in Laser Focus, describing the photo-ablative properties of an excimer laser on organic material. This was very exciting information, but, unfortunately, Peyman did not have access to this laser, which at the time was new and very expensive. By 1985 and beyond, many investigators were interested in ablating the corneal surface. However, because of his previous experience with the CO_{2} laser, Peyman wanted to avoid surface ablation in order to prevent potential corneal scarring and the pain associated with the removal of the corneal epithelium, necessary to expose the surface of the cornea. Therefore, in July 1985, he applied for a patent that described a method of modifying corneal refractive errors using laser ablation under a corneal flap. This US patent was accepted after two revisions and issued in June, 1989. Peyman performed a number of experimental studies evaluating the effect of various excimer lasers in collaboration with Physics Department of the University of Helsinki, Finland. Since he had purchased an Erb-Yag laser in the U.S., he evaluated the concept using this laser in vivo in rabbit and primate eyes and described the creation of a hinged corneal flap to enable the ablation to be performed on the exposed corneal bed, thus reducing the potential for postoperative scarring and pain.

Always aware of the potential limitations of his invention, Peyman devoted considerable time and effort in subsequent years to ameliorating them. Interestingly, he seems to have never undergone LASIK himself. In order to improve the risk/benefit considerations of the LASIK procedure, he invented in 2004 and patented a broad range of ablative and non-ablative inlays to be placed under the surgically created corneal flap (US Patent 6,702,807). These inlays offered many potential advantages over the standard LASIK technique, the most significant of which is that the inlay procedure is reversible.

However, their ablation was not predictable. In October 2009, Peyman invented and applied for a patent on a method of preventing corneal implant rejection, which was approved in 2017 (US Patent 9,681,942). It consisted of forming a Lasik flap in the cornea, raising the flap, inserting a lamellar cornea under the flap so as to overlie the exposed stromal tissue. The inlay is ablated with wavefront guided excimer laser, to correct the refractive errors of the eye, applying a cross linking solution to the inlay and stromal tissue of the cornea, replacing the corneal flap and cross linking the inlay with UV radiation, killing the cellular elements in the inlay and its surrounding cornea, preventing cellular migration in the inlay and its rejection or encapsulation by the host corneal cells. This new procedure is now called “Mesoick” (Meso means Inside, Implant, Crosslinking Keratomileusis (US Patent 9,037,033). This creates an immune privileged cell free space that does not initiate an immune response to an implant. A synthetic, crosslinked organic or polymeric lens can be implanted in the corneal pocket to compensate for the patient's refractive error. The implant can be exchanged as the eye grows or refractive need dictates.

== Laser in ophthalmology ==
Peyman has been granted 200 US Patents covering a broad range of novel medical devices, intra-ocular drug delivery, surgical techniques, as well as new methods of diagnosis and treatment.

- First attempt to correct refractive - Modification of rabbit corneal curvature with use of carbon dioxide laser burns (1980)
- Errors using lasers Evaluations of laser use in ophthalmology - Histopathological studies on transscleral argon-krypton laser coagulation with an exolaser probe (1984)
- Comparison of the effects of argon fluoride (ArF) and krypton fluoride (KrF) excimer lasers on ocular structures (1985)
- The Nd:YAG laser 1.3μ wavelength: In vitro effects on ocular structures (1987)
- Effects of an erbium:YAG laser on ocular structures (1987)
- Contact laser: Thermal sclerostomy ab interna (1987)
- Internal trans-pars plana filtering procedure in humans (1988)
- Internal pars plana sclerotomy with the contact Nd:YAG laser: An experimental study (1988)
- Intraocular telescope for age related - Age-related macular degeneration and its management (1988)
- Endolaser for vitrectomy (Arch Ophthalmol. 1980 Nov;98(11):2062-4)
- New operating microscope with stereovision for the operator and his assistant(US Patent 4,138,191)

Development of direct intraocular drug delivery and Vitrectomy

- Refs. Articles; J Ophthalmic Vis Res. 2018 Apr-Jun;13(2):91-92. Doi, Retina. 2009 Jul-Aug;29(7):875-912.
- Vitreoretinal surgical techniques; Informa 2007 UK Ltd ISBN 978-1841846262.

Surgical removal of intraocular tumors

- Can J Ophthalmol. 1988 Aug;23(5):218-23.
- Br J Ophthalmol. 1998 Oct;82(10):1147-53.

=== Remote controlled system for Laser Surgery ===
This technology enables an ophthalmologist to treat a patient located in another location e.g. another city by a laser system controlled remotely, via the internet, using a sophisticated secure system in a non-contact fashion.

US Patent 9,931,171	Laser treatment of an eye structure or a body surface from a remote location
US Patent 9,510,974	Laser coagulation of an eye structure or a body surface from a remote location
US Patent 9,037,217	Laser coagulation of an eye structure or a body surface from a remote location
US Patent 8,903,468	Laser coagulation of an eye structure from a remote location
US Patent 8,452,372	System for laser coagulation of the retina from a remote location

Development of precision thermotherapy in oncology Therapy of malignant tumors in early-stage along with imaging and immune therapy and precision localized drug delivery:

US Patent 10,376,600	Early disease detection and therapy
US Patent 10,300,121	Early cancer detection and enhance immunotherpay
US Patent 9,849,092	Early cancer detection and enhance immunotherapy
US Patent 9,393,396	Method and composition for hyperthermally treating cells

Tele-laser system and tele- medicine with a novel Dynamic Identity recognition

US Patent 10,456,209	Remote laser treatment system with dynamic imaging

Macular degeneration

- Retinal pigment epithelium transplantation - A technique for retinal pigment epithelium transplantation for age-related macular degeneration secondary to extensive subfoveal scarring (1991)
- Photodynamic therapy for ARMD - The effect of light-activating .n ethyl etiopurpurin (SnET2) on normal rabbit choriocapillaries (1996)
- Problems with and pitfalls of photodynamic therapy (2000)
- Semiconductor photodiode stimulation - Subretinal semiconductor microphotodiode array (1998)
- Subretinal implantation of semiconductor-based photodiodes. Durability of novel implant designs (2002)
- The artificial silicon retina microchip for the treatment of vision loss from retinitis pigmentosa (2004)
- Testing intravitreal toxicity of Bevacizumab (Avastin), (2006)
- Oscillatory photodynamic therapy for choroidal neovascularization and central serous retinopathy; a pilot study (2013).
- 8,141,557 Method of oscillatory thermotherapy of biological tissue.

Intravitreal slow-release Rock inhibitors alone or in combination with Anti-VEGF

US Patent 10,272,035	Ophthalmic drug delivery method
US Patent 9,486,357	Ophthalmic drug delivery system and method
US Patent 10,278,920	Drug delivery implant and a method using the same

Artificial Retina Stimulation

- Semiconductor photodiode stimulation of the retina - Subretinal semiconductor microphotodiode array (1998)
- Subretinal implantation of semiconductor-based photodiodes. Durability of novel implant designs (2002)
- The artificial silicon retina microchip for the treatment of vision loss from retinitis pigmentosa (2004)

Quantum dots and Optogenetic for artificial retinal and brain stimulation and gene therapy

- 8,409,263—Methods to regulate polarization of excitable cells
- 8,388,668—Methods to regulate polarization of excitable cells
- 8,460,351—Methods to regulate polarization and enhance function of excitable cells
- 8,562,660—Methods to regulate polarization and enhance function of excitable cells

Gene therapy with non-viral nanoparticles and CRISPR

- 10,022,457—Methods to regulate polarization and enhance function of excitable cells

Adaptic optic phoropter for automated vision correction and Tunable light field camera in use for VR and AR technology

- 7,993,399—External lens adapted to change refractive properties
- 8,409,278—External lens with flexible membranes for automatic correction of the refractive errors of a person
- 8,603,164—Adjustable fluidic telescope combined with an intraocular lens
- 9,016,860-Fluidic adaptive optics fundus camera
- 9,164,206-Variable focal length achromatic lens system comprising a diffractive lens and a refractive lens
- 9,191,568-Automated camera system with one or more fluidic lenses
- 9,671,607-Flexible fluidic mirror and hybrid system
- 9,681,800-Holographic adaptive see-through phoropter
- 10,133,056-Flexible fluidic mirror and hybrid system

== Honors and awards ==
Among other awards and honors, Peyman has received the National Medal of Technology and Innovation (2012), the Waring Medal of the Journal of Refractive Surgery (2008), and the American Academy of Ophthalmology's Lifetime Achievement Award (2008) He was named a fellow of the National Academy of Inventors in 2013.
