= John Pratt-Johnson =

Canadian ophthalmologist

John Ashburnham Pratt-Johnson, FRCS(C.), FRCS(Edin.), (June 6, 1929 - September 9, 2015) was a Canadian ophthalmologist and Emeritus Professor of Ophthalmology, University of British Columbia, Vancouver, British Columbia, Canada. He was a famous pediatric ophthalmologist and trained many fellows at the university. He also involved himself in international cooperation to improve the status of medical care in the area of blindness prevention and access to surgical expertise for under-served areas in poor countries. As part of Orbis and the board of directors of Seva Canada Society he has helped organise funds, build facilities and train health care workers and ophthalmologists, particularly from Nepal, where prevalence of blindness is quite high.

Pratt-Johnson had over 50 publications in international peer-reviewed journals and has given many memorial lectures on pediatric ophthalmology and strabismus, including 18th annual Frank D. Costenbader Lecture in 1991 and the Sixth annual Richard G. Scobee Memorial Lecture. There is an annual lecture dedicated in his name.

Pratt-Johnson was the president of the American Association for Pediatric Ophthalmology and Strabismus from 1983 to 1984. He co-wrote with orthoptist, Geraldine Tilson, Management of Strabismus and Amblyopia: A Practical Guide - a book giving straightforward guidelines for managing patients with strabismus, amblyopia and related disorders.

He died in September 2015.
