= David E. Shoch =

American ophthalmologist, educator (1918–1990)

David E. Shoch (1918–1990) was an American ophthalmologist and educator.

== Biography ==
David E. Shoch was born in 1918 Warsaw, Poland, but grew up in New York City. He completed his bachelor's degree from the City College of New York. He obtained master's degree and doctorate in biochemistry from Northwestern University. In 1953, he joined the ophthalmology department at Northwestern Medical School, eventually serving as department head from 1966 to 1983.

Shoch practiced ophthalmology at Northwestern Hospital, Children's Memorial Hospital, and the Veterans Administration Lakeside Medical Center. He was the editor of abstracts for the American Journal of Ophthalmology for over twenty years.

Shoch died of cancer at Northwestern Memorial Hospital in Chicago at the age of 71. He was a resident of Glencoe, Illinois, and was survived by his wife Gertrude, two sons—James of Somerville, Massachusetts, and John of Palo Alto, California.
