= Ophthalmology (disambiguation) =

Ophthalmology may refer to:

- A branch of medicine called ophthalmology
- A medical journal called Ophthalmology (journal)
- A medical journal called Archives of Ophthalmology
