= Marshall M. Parks =

American ophthalmologist (1918–2005)

Marshall Miller Parks (July 6, 1918 – July 25, 2005) was an American ophthalmologist known to many as "the father of pediatric ophthalmology".

== Early life ==
Parks was born in Old Mission, Michigan to Ruth E. and Reuben Elvin Parks. In 1939, he earned a BS from Illinois College and in 1943 graduated from the Saint Louis University School of Medicine. His success in medical school gained him induction into Alpha Omega Alpha Society. During World War II, Parks served as a medical officer on destroyers in the United States Navy, including the USS Gamble and USS Terror during the battle of Iwo Jima.

== Professional career ==
Parks studied under the guidance of Frank D. Costenbader, the first ophthalmologist to dedicate his practice solely to the care of children. At Children's Hospital in Washington, D.C., now known as the Children's National Medical Center, they began the first ophthalmology fellowship training program of any subspecialty. This evolved from the rotation of Heed Fellowship ophthalmologists who had trained with Costenbader for many years. The first Children's Hospital of Washington fellow was Leonard Apt in 1959.

Parks' scientific contributions include:

- Elucidation of monofixation syndrome
- Description and refinement of numerous eye muscle surgical techniques, particularly the fornix incision approach to strabismus surgery
- Recognition of the benefits of very early strabismus correction (by age 1 year)
- Innovation in surgical techniques for pediatric cataracts

=== Positions ===
From 1974 to 1975, Parks was the first president of the American Association for Pediatric Ophthalmology and Strabismus, a professional association of which he was a founding member. In 1982, he was president of the American Academy of Ophthalmology.

- Chairman, Department of Ophthalmology at the Washington Hospital Center and the Children’s National Medical Center
- Founder, president and chairman of the board, Children’s Eye Care Foundation
- Director and chairman, American Board of Ophthalmology
- Director and chairman of the board, Foundation of the American Academy of Ophthalmology
- Advisory Council for Ophthalmic Surgery of the American College of Surgeons
- Chairman, Scientific Committee of the Retina Foundation of the Southwest

Editor / Assistant Editor

- American Medical Association Archives of Ophthalmology
- Clinical Proceedings
- Survey of Ophthalmology
- American Orthoptic Journal

=== Awards ===
- Founder of the Costenbader Society
- Recipient of the Lucien Howe Medal from the American Academy of Ophthalmology
- Senior Honor Award from the American Academy of Ophthalmology
- Life Achievement Award and the Laureate Recognition Award 2004 from the American Academy of Ophthalmology
- Superior Public Service Award from the US Naval Department
- John Carroll Society Medal
- Best Ophthalmologist in America award from Ophthalmology Times
- Leadership Award from The National Eye Care Foundation
- Leslie Dana Gold Medal from the St. Louis Society for the Blind
- Induction into the Knights of Malta
- Vicennial Medal from Georgetown University
- Arthur Linksz Award from the International Strabismological Society
- Professional Service Award, the Society for the Prevention of Blindness

=== Legacy ===
Parks trained over 160 fellows in pediatric ophthalmology and strabismus; many of his former fellows later held leadership positions in the field.

Dr. Kenneth Wright, a former Parks fellow and current director of Pediatric Ophthalmology Research and Education at Cedars-Sinai Medical Center in Los Angeles, published a tribute to Dr. Parks in the medical text Pediatric Ophthalmology & Strabismus, calling him “the driving force that has led to the development and maturation of our specialty, pediatric ophthalmology and strabismus.”

== Family life ==
Parks and his late wife, Angeline Miller Parks, raised eleven children. Following the death of his first wife, Parks and Martha McSteen Parks married and resided in Washington, D.C. for 14 years prior to his death. He is a devout Catholic.

== See also ==
- Parks–Bielschowsky three-step test
