= John Kempen =

American ophthalmologist and epidemiologist

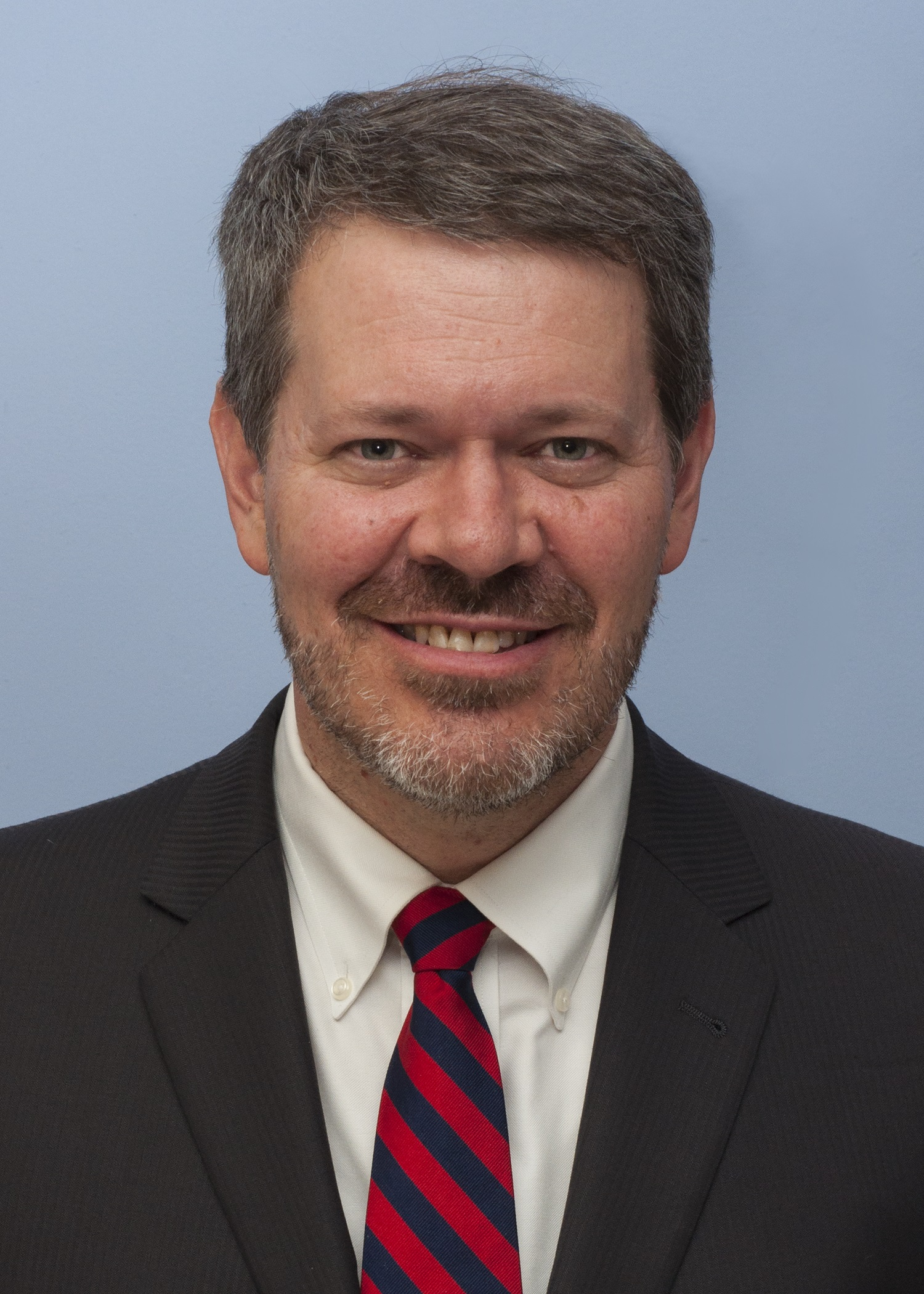
Kempen in 2015

John Harold Kempen is an American ophthalmologist and epidemiologist currently serving as a Professor of Ophthalmology at Harvard Medical School as well as an Adjunct Professor at both Addis Ababa University and Myunsung Medical College (MMC) in Addis Ababa, Ethiopia. Kempen holds the position of Director of Global Surgery and Health at Massachusetts Eye and Ear in Boston, Massachusetts. Additionally, he is both the President and a Board Member of Sight for Souls, a nonprofit organization registered as a 501(c)(3) in the U.S.

== Education ==
Kempen earned his Bachelor's degree in Biological Sciences from Stanford University in 1988. He completed his Doctor of Medicine at the UC San Diego School of Medicine in 1992. He completed residency in ophthalmology at the University of Washington in 1996 then proceeded to complete the Johns Hopkins Public Health Ophthalmology Program including a fellowship in Preventive Ophthalmology and Master of Public Health in International Health from Johns Hopkins Bloomberg School of Public Health. After this, he completed a Uveitis and Clinical Immunology fellowship at Johns Hopkins’ Wilmer Eye Institute and an NIH-funded Clinical Trials program with the Johns Hopkins Center for Clinical Trials. He later received his Master of Health Sciences in Biostatistics in 1999 and his PhD in Epidemiology in 2001, also from Johns Hopkins.

== Career ==
Kempen is trained as both a clinical ophthalmologist and a PhD-trained investigator in clinical epidemiology, specializing in ocular inflammatory and infectious diseases, commonly referred to as "uveitis". He has built a career as a clinician-investigator, spending seven years at Johns Hopkins University, 11.5 years at the University of Pennsylvania, and most recently Massachusetts Eye and Ear since 2017. In 2021, he became an affiliate of Harvard School of Medicine's Global Health and Social Medicine program. His research focuses on program development in ocular inflammatory diseases research programs, with a focus on clinical trials, and the burden of eye disease.

In 2014, Kempen and his colleagues established the eye care charity Sight for Souls, leading him to Ethiopia to create a self-sustaining eye institute in collaboration with the MCM Comprehensive Specialized Hospital. While continuing research about uveitis, he expanded his research program to address issues of the poor in sub-Saharan Africa including the neglected tropical disease trachoma.

Kempen has authored over 200 original data publications, with an average approaching 200 citations per manuscript. Kempen previously served as Editor-in-Chief for the journal Ophthalmic Epidemiology and Executive Editor for Uveitis on the editorial board of the American Journal of Ophthalmology.
