= Translational Vision Science & Technology =

Medical journal

- Discipline: Ophthalmology
- Language: English
- Edited by: Roy S. Chuck, MD, PhD

Publication details
- History: 2012–present
- Publisher: Association for Research in Vision and Ophthalmology
- Open access: Yes
- Impact factor: 2.7 (2025)

Standard abbreviations
- ISO 4: Transl. Vis. Sci. Technol.

Indexing
- ISSN: 2164-2591
- OCLC no.: 802751328

Links
- Journal homepage; Online archive

Translational Vision Science & Technology is a peer-reviewed online-only open access medical journal covering ophthalmology. It was established in 2012 and is published by the Association for Research in Vision and Ophthalmology, of which it is an official journal. The editor-in-chief is Roy S. Chuck. According to the Journal Citation Reports, the journal has a 2018 impact factor of 2.399, ranking it 19th out of 58 journals in the category "Ophthalmology".
