= Edward Lorenzo Holmes =

American ophthalmologist

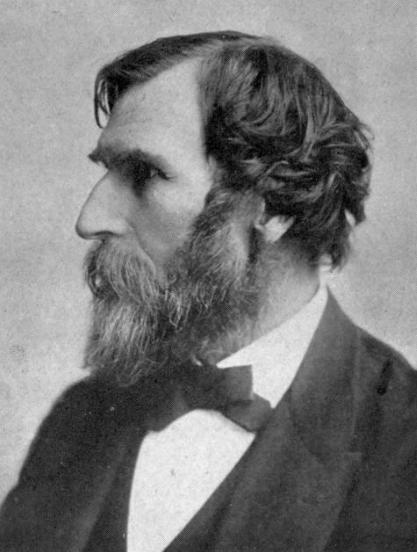
- Born: January 28, 1828; Dedham, Massachusetts
- Died: February 12, 1900 (aged 72); Chicago, Illinois
- Burial place: Rosehill Cemetery
- Education: Harvard Medical School
- Occupation: Ophthalmologist
- Spouse: Paula von Wieser (m. 1862)
- Children: 5

Edward Lorenzo Holmes (1828–1900) was an American ophthalmologist who founded The University of Illinois Eye and Ear Infirmary.

== Biography ==
Holmes was born in Dedham, Massachusetts on January 28, 1828. He received instruction from the historian John Lathrop Motley, and learned German from Henry Wadsworth Longfellow. He summered at Brook Farm, an experimental, utopian, literary community, based on the principles of transcendentalism and shared manual labor. Holmes received undergraduate and medical school training at Harvard, followed by postgraduate training at Massachusetts General Hospital. He then studied ophthalmology and otology in Paris and Vienna.

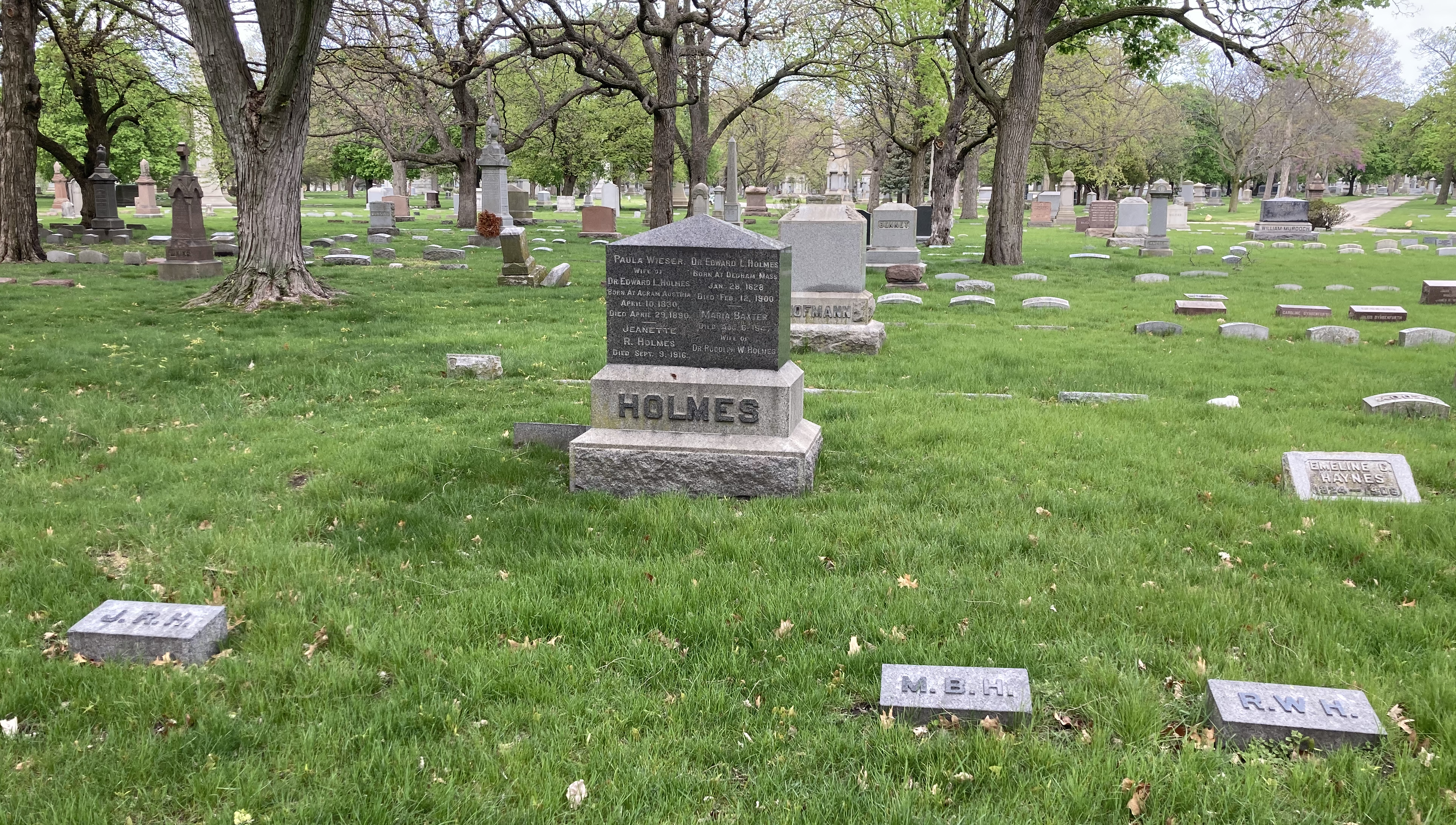
Holmes's grave at Rosehill Cemetery

He married Paula von Wieser in 1862, and they had five children.

At age 29, Holmes moved to Chicago, where, in May 1858 he founded the Chicago Eye and Ear Infirmary, the first hospital of its kind west of the Alleghenies. Holmes served as head of the institution until 1885, when he moved to Rush Medical College, subsequently becoming staff president there.

He died from pneumonia in Chicago on February 12, 1900. He was buried at Rosehill Cemetery.
