= Masjed Soleyman =

City in Khuzestan province, Iran

Masjed Soleyman Persian: مسجدسلیمان
- City
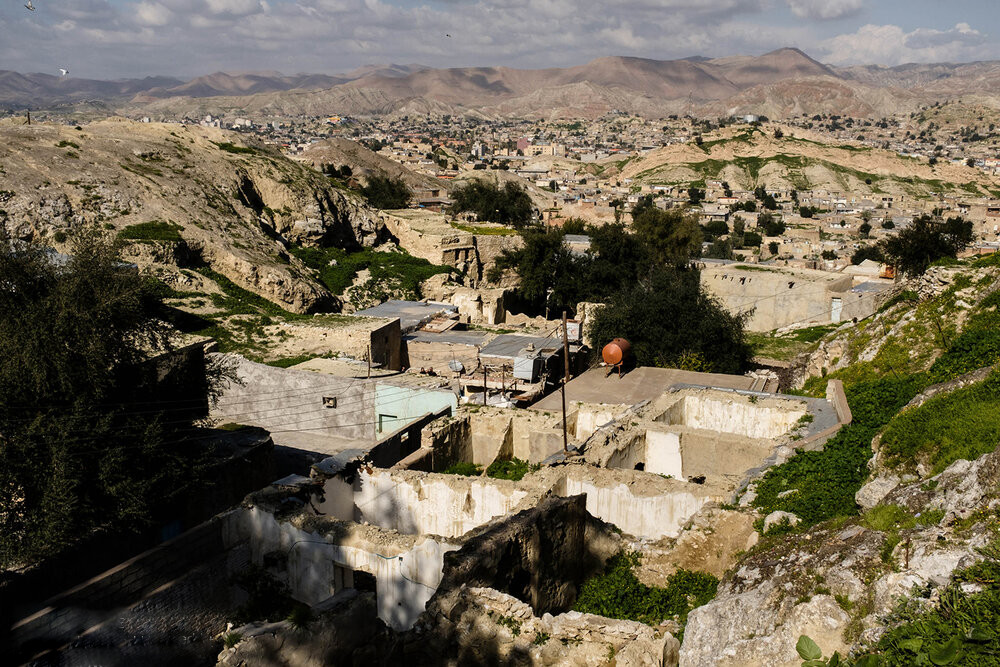
- General view of Masjed Soleyman

- Location within Iran
- Coordinates: 31°57′36″N 49°17′17″E
- Country: Iran
- Province: Khuzestan
- County: Masjed Soleyman
- District: Central

Population (2016)
  - Total: 100,497
- Time zone: UTC+3:30 (IRST)

Masjed Soleyman [fa] (Persian: مسجدسلیمان) (Note: Also romanized as Masjed Soleiman, Masjed-e Soleymān, Masjedsoleimān, and Masjid-i-Sulaiman) is a city in the Central District of Masjed Soleyman County, Khuzestan province, Iran, serving as capital of both the county and the district.

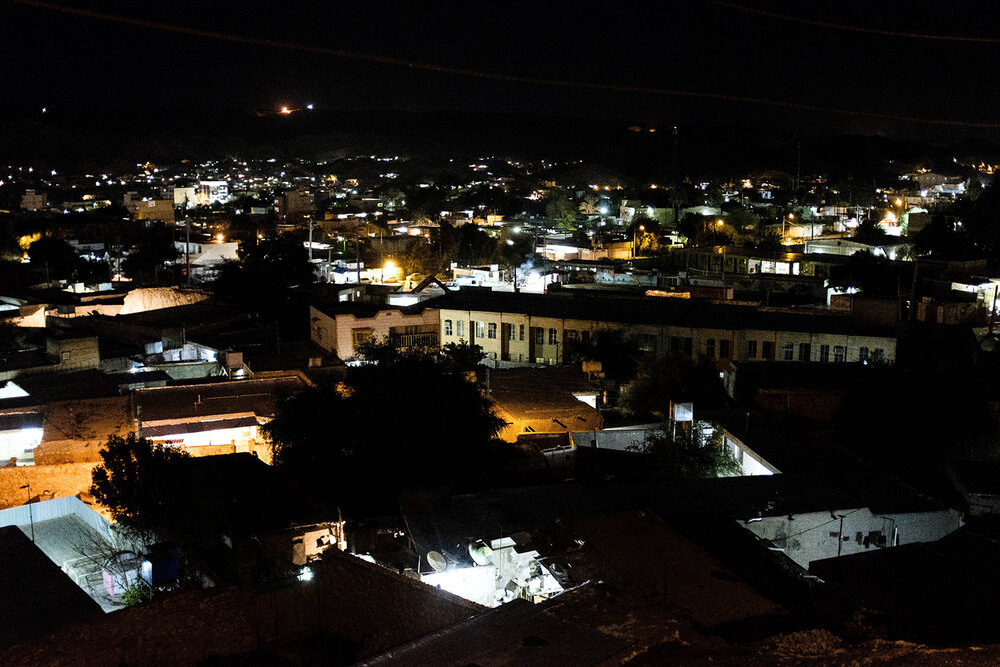
Night view of Masjed Soleyman

== History ==
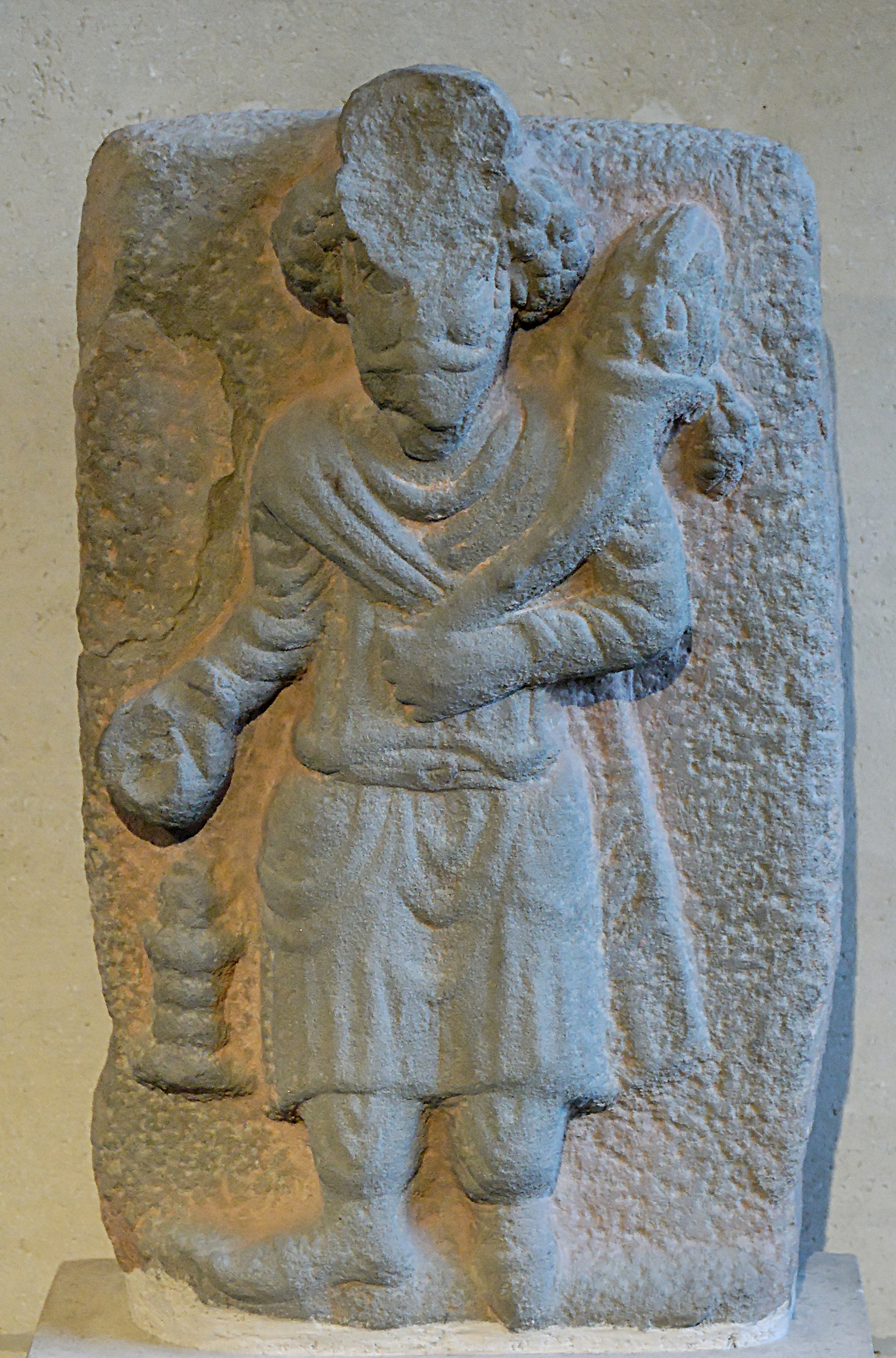
Parthian king, making an offering to the god Herakles-Verethragna. Masdjid-e Suleiman, Iran. 2nd–3rd century CE. Louvre Museum Sb 7302.

The city of Masjed Soleyman is among the ancient cities of the early Mesopotamian Elam civilisation which was originally known as Assak, but was changed to Parsomash by the early Achaemenids. In 1955, Roman Ghirshman discovered evidence of human inhabitation dating to 10,000 years ago in Pepdeh cave in vicinity of the current city of Lali, making it one of the oldest inhabited sites in the Khuzestan plain. Ghirshman's excavations in the area of Masjed Soleyman led him to believe that Parsomash (present-day Masjed Soleyman) was the oldest capital of the Achaemenid Empire.

The remains of an ancient fire-temple known locally as Sar-masjid and attributed to the legendary pre-historic king Houshang, and the ruins of an Achaemenid palace known locally as Bard- Neshandeh are among the archaeological ruins in this city. Under the Seleucids and the Parthians the city of Masjed Soleyman remained an important city.

During the Sasanian era canals and weir-bridges were built, resulting into the cultivation of tobacco and cereals in the region. The ruins of such edifices can be seen in the Tembi region, Godar Landar and Dow-Paloon region (near Izeh); however, following the Muslim conquest of Iran, many of the ancient monolithic structures of the region were demolished and the region was ruled by rulers imposed by the Umayyad Caliphs and remained relatively obscure, until the Qajar era when it became a center for the tar trade and its name was changed to Tol-Ghor, with its borders being limited from the Karun river's Western bank to the tar springs; however, with the advent of the discovery of oil in the region, this city was named Jahangiri, but after the first oil well began production it was renamed Maydan-Nafton. In 1924, the National Council of Iran through an edict from Reza Khan officially changed the city's name to Masjed Soleyman.

=== Masjed Soleyman in the 20th century ===
Masjed Soleyman regained importance with the discovery of oil and the erecting of the first oil well in the middle east by D'Arcy's concession. In 1900, he agreed to fund a search for oil and minerals in Qajar Iran headed by Wolff, Ketabchee and Cotte, although D'Arcy never visited Persia himself. Negotiations with the reigning monarch Mozaffar al-Din Shah Qajar began in 1901, and with the offer of £20,000 (£2.1 million today), for a sixty-year concession to explore for oil—later, the D'Arcy concession—was secured in May, covering 480,000 square miles (1,200,000 km^{2}), and stipulated that D'Arcy would have the oil rights to the entire country except for five provinces in Northern Iran.

In exchange, the Iranian government was given 16% of the oil company's annual profits, an agreement that would remain in effect until the 1979 Iranian Revolution. After the D'Arcy concession, the British government became much more concerned with the stability of Iran because of their reliance on the country's vast oil reserves.

=== Constitutional Revolution ===
Ḥossain Qolī Khan Haft Lang was appointed superintendent (nāẓem) of the Baḵtīārīs by the Shah in 1862 and head of the tribe (īlḵān) in 1867. He was the first recipient of this title, and in the tribe he became known by the surname Īlḵānī. In 1882, the Shah caused him to be murdered and replaced by his brother Emām Qolī Khan, surnamed Ḥājī Īlḵānī.

From then almost without interruption until the abolition of the title khan in 1956, the successive heads of the tribe were descendants of one or the other of the two brothers. The Haft Lang tribe played a significant role; particularly during the advent of the country's Constitutional Revolution (1905–1907). This event largely succeeded as a result of the Bakhtari tribal coalition military campaign led by Ali-Gholi Khan, Sardar Asaad II, a chieftain of the Haft-lang tribe and his brother Najaf Qoli Khan Bakhtiari- Saad ad-Daula (also referred to as Samsam-os Saltane) whom in 1909 marched up to the gates of Tehran, and eventually deposed Mohammad Ali Shah Qajar (r. 1907–1909).

Following his abdication in 1909, Mohammad Ali Shah went to exile in Russia. This incident secured Saad ad-Daula the position of Prime Minister in the period that followed the abdication of the Qajar Shah. Nonetheless, with Russian backing, the Shah would attempt to regain his throne in 1911 by landing with a coalition of forces at Astarabad . However, his efforts to reclaim his throne would bear no fruit. In this sense, the Bakhtiaris played a critical role in saving the revolution from the Qajar forces.

=== Pahlavi era ===
With the expansion of Bakhtiari influence, influential policy makers (particularly in Tehran) began to worry regarding the potential Bakhtiari takeover of Iran's affairs. Prior to this point, the Bakhtiari had largely remained within their own territorial boundaries. In February 1921, the said policy makers instigated a coup by which Reza Pahlavi the commander of the entire Cossack Brigade which was based in Qazvinordered his troops to march towards Tehran and seized the capital.

He forced the dissolution of the government and installed Zia ol Din Tabatabaee as the new prime minister. In 1925, Reza Pahlavi was appointed as the legal monarch of Iran by the decision of Iran's constituent assembly. The assembly deposed Ahmad Shah Qajar, the last Shah of the Qajar dynasty, and amended Iran's 1906 constitution to allow selection of Reza Pahlavi as the Shah of Iran. The Bakhtiari influence in Iranian politics thus waned, but they would continue to play an important role within the early 20th century politics of Iran. Reza Shah Pahlavi (r. 1925–1941) made the destruction of the Bakhtiari influence his mission; moreover, the existence of oil on Bakhtiari territory further motivated the Pahlavi monarch to undermine the autonomy of the tribe and force its population to adhere to the commands of the central government.

Reza Shah would eventually execute a few noteworthy tribal leaders to crush Bakhtiari autonomy and maintain control over the tribe. Amongst the executed Khans was Mohammad Reza Khan (Sardar-e-Fateh), whose son later became the Pahlavi Prime Minister Shapour Bakhtiar. The latter event was a turning point for Bakhtiari and their rise within Iranian politics.

=== Discovery of oil in the early 20th century ===
In the late 19th century Britain's Royal Navy, under the leadership of Sir Winston Churchill decided to shift its fuel source from coal to oil; therefore the British admiralty and the War office became the de facto force behind the British government's quest for oil. During the 1890s, research and reports were collected by the British foreign office indicating that Persia had great oil potential.

The British Foreign office selected William Knox D'Arcy, a millionaire investor, and provided him with the reports, promising him greater wealth and governmental support if he invested in the excavation of oil. D'Arcy agreed and sent out representatives to Tehran to win a concession that would give him the exclusive rights to prospect for oil in Persia. On 16 April 1901 negotiations commenced between D'Arcy's representatives and the Qajar monarch Mozzafar al-Din Shah over a potential oil concession.[4]

On 28 May 1901, Shah Mozzafar al-Din signed an 18 article concession which exclusively gave D'Arcy the rights to prospect, explore, exploit, transport and sell natural gas, petroleum, asphalt and mineral waxes in Persia.[7] This concession also granted D'Arcy these rights for a 60-year period, and it covered an area of 1,242,000 square kilometers.[8] or roughly three quarters of the country.

In 1902, a drilling team under George B. Reynolds was sent to Chiah Surkh near the current Iran-Iraq border and in 1904 discovered oil; however, he and his team suffered much hardship and the venture had put a strain on D'arcy's funds in as such that he had already spent £160,000, and was overdrawn at Lloyds Bank by £177,000. In 1905, the British Admiralty fearing the possible selling of the concession to its rivals in the Middle east convinced D'Arcy through an elaborate ruse to seek financial support from Burmah Oil Company Ltd., and in 1905 the Concession Syndicate was established which was later renamed as the Anglo Persian Oil Co. in 1909.[18]

The infusion of capital provided by Burmah Oil allowed for the exploration of oil to continue; however, drilling operations shifted to southwestern Persia, and all drilling equipment was shipped to a new drilling site at Masjed Soleyman.[19] Once again Reynolds encountered problems in this region with hostile tribes and the local population.

Reynolds often had to pay them a high fee and guarantee them a share of profits in order to protect the concession.[20] In 1907, due to no success in findings, D'Arcy sold off the majority of his shares to Burmah Oil for £203,067 cash and £900,000 in shares, allowing Burmah to become the major shareholder of the company.[15]. At 4:00 am on 26 May 1908, commercial quantities of oil were struck at the Masjed Soleyman site and a fifty-foot gusher of petroleum shot up the no. 1 drilling rig.[22]

In April 1909, D'Arcy was appointed a director of the newly founded Anglo-Persian Oil Company (APOC), which would later become British Petroleum (BP). By 1911, APOC had run a pipeline from the oil field in Masjed Soleyman to a refinery at Abadan.

== Demographics ==
=== Ethnicity ===
The city of Masjed Soleyman is home to a large Bakhtiyari population of the Haft-lang tribe. The Bakhtiaris occupy the mountain tract in South-West Persia lying roughly between longitudes 31 to 34 N and 48 40' to 51 E, bound on the south by the plains of Khuzistan and on the north by the districts of Chahar Mahal, Faridan, and Khonsar where the central Iranian Plateau blends into the great southern mountain range. Bakhtiaris were semi-nomadic, and their livelihood depended on the survival of their herds of sheep, cattle, and horses. The four main tribal divisions of Haft Lang are Duraki, Babadi, Bakhtiarwand, and Dinaruni, who are then divided into lesser clans.

=== Population ===
At the time of the 2006 National Census, the city's population was 106,121 in 22,393 households. The following census in 2011 counted 103,369 people in 24,577 households. The 2016 census measured the population of the city as 100,497 people in 26,502 households.

== Climate ==
At Masjed-Soleyman, the summers are long, sweltering, arid, and clear and the winters are cool, dry, and mostly clear. Over the course of the year, the temperature typically varies from 45 °F to 112 °F and is rarely below 38 °F or above 117 °F. The best time of year to visit Masjed-Soleyman is from mid-September to late October. Masjed Soleyman is classified as having a hot semi-arid climate (Köppen climate classification: BSh).

Climate data for Masjed Soleyman (1991-2020, extremes 1985-2025)
Month	Jan	Feb	Mar	Apr	May	Jun	Jul	Aug	Sep	Oct	Nov	Dec	Year
Record high °C (°F)	26.4 (79.5)	29.0 (84.2)	37.8 (100.0)	43.1 (109.6)	48.1 (118.6)	51.2 (124.2)	52.0 (125.6)	53.0 (127.4)	48.0 (118.4)	43.2 (109.8)	34.2 (93.6)	30.0 (86.0)	53.0 (127.4)
Mean daily maximum °C (°F)	17.0 (62.6)	19.4 (66.9)	24.0 (75.2)	30.7 (87.3)	38.0 (100.4)	43.6 (110.5)	45.4 (113.7)	45.2 (113.4)	41.3 (106.3)	34.8 (94.6)	25.3 (77.5)	19.3 (66.7)	32.0 (89.6)
Daily mean °C (°F)	11.8 (53.2)	13.8 (56.8)	18.0 (64.4)	24.4 (75.9)	31.6 (88.9)	36.8 (98.2)	38.9 (102.0)	38.3 (100.9)	33.9 (93.0)	27.6 (81.7)	19.0 (66.2)	13.6 (56.5)	25.6 (78.1)
Mean daily minimum °C (°F)	7.6 (45.7)	8.8 (47.8)	12.3 (54.1)	17.9 (64.2)	24.3 (75.7)	28.7 (83.7)	31.6 (88.9)	30.9 (87.6)	26.4 (79.5)	20.9 (69.6)	13.8 (56.8)	9.3 (48.7)	19.4 (66.9)
Record low °C (°F)	−3.6 (25.5)	−4.4 (24.1)	1.8 (35.2)	7.0 (44.6)	14.4 (57.9)	22.0 (71.6)	24.0 (75.2)	22.0 (71.6)	19.6 (67.3)	12.4 (54.3)	3.4 (38.1)	0.5 (32.9)	−4.4 (24.1)
Average precipitation mm (inches)	88.8 (3.50)	51.2 (2.02)	64.9 (2.56)	34.3 (1.35)	7.3 (0.29)	0.0 (0.0)	0.1 (0.00)	0.0 (0.0)	1.0 (0.04)	10.9 (0.43)	63.4 (2.50)	93.9 (3.70)	415.8 (16.37)
Average precipitation days (≥ 1.0 mm)	7.3	5.8	5.8	4.2	1.2	0.0	0.0	0.0	0.1	1.3	4.5	6.6	36.8
Average relative humidity (%)	74	64	52	38	22	15	16	17	19	29	53	72	39.3
Average dew point °C (°F)	6.7 (44.1)	6.2 (43.2)	6.5 (43.7)	7.4 (45.3)	5.5 (41.9)	4.0 (39.2)	7.2 (45.0)	8.0 (46.4)	6.1 (43.0)	6.3 (43.3)	7.7 (45.9)	8.0 (46.4)	6.6 (43.9)
Mean monthly sunshine hours	168	172	209	217	267	322	328	336	304	258	193	167	2,941
Source 1: NOAA NCEI
Source 2: Iran Meteorological Organization (records), Ogimet

Climate data for Masjed Soleyman
Month	Jan	Feb	Mar	Apr	May	Jun	Jul	Aug	Sep	Oct	Nov	Dec	Year
No. of days with Visibility ≤ 2 km (1.2 miles)	10.0	6.1	4.6	1.6	3.1	2.5	4.1	3.0	1.0	0.8	2.6	8.3	47.7
Mean number of days with Dust	0.7	2.9	3.9	5.0	7.5	10.4	13.1	7.3	4.5	2.3	0.9	0.4	58.9

== Notable people ==
- Abbas Bagheri Lotfabad (1965–2022), Professor of Ophthalmology, Shahid Beheshti University of Medical Sciences.
- Ali-Qoli Khan Bakhtiari (1856–1917), a chieftain of the Bakhtiari Haft Lang tribe and one of the primary figures of the Persian Constitutional Revolution.
- Bibi Maryam Bakhtiari (1874–1937), revolutionary and activist of the Iranian Constitutional Revolution who was the daughter of Hossein Gholi Khan Bakhtiari, and the sister of Ali-Qoli Khan Bakhtiari.
- Soraya Esfandiary-Bakhtiary (1932–2001), Queen of the Imperial State of Iran and second wife of Shah Mohammad Reza Pahlavi.
- Bijan Allipour (1949–2023), Iranian business executive. former CEO of NISOC.
- Mehran Karimi Nasseri (1945–2022), Iranian refugee who lived in the departure lounge of Terminal One in Charles de Gaulle Airport from 26 August 1988 until July 2006.
- Habib Far Abbasi (1997–), footballer.
- Masoud Bakhtiari (1940-2006), teacher, poet and singer.
- Mohsen Rezaee (1954–), Iranian politician, economist and former military commander.
- Laleh Bakhtiar, author and former professor at the University of Chicago, who wrote a female re-interpretation of the Qur'an.
- Rudi Bakhtiar, former CNN and FOX TV news anchor and journalist.
- Shahpour Bakhtiar, politician and Prime Minister of Iran (1979).
- Teymur Bakhtiar, former general and head of SAVAK.
- Behnoosh Bakhtiari, actress.
- David Bakhtiari, NFL player and offensive tackle for the Green Bay Packers.
- Shaghayegh Dehghan, Iranian television actress, half Bakhtiari.
- Khalil Esfandiary-Bakhtiary, Iranian Ambassador to West Germany (1952–1961).
- Eman Mobali, football player.
- Bahram Akasheh, Iran's leading experts on earthquakes.

== MasjedSoleyman Municipality ==
Masjed Soleyman Municipality is a public non-governmental organization that was founded in 1960 and manages the city of Masjed Soleyman. The highest executive authority of this organization is the mayor of Masjed Soleyman, who is elected by the Islamic Council of Masjed Soleyman. The current mayor of Masjed Soleyman is Mohammad Khosravi.

== History ==
Masjed Soleyman Municipality became a member of the International Union of Municipalities by a decision of the Organization of the Union of Municipalities of Iran and was established on March 12, 1960. Ali Asghar Nouri Fayazi was registered as the first mayor of Masjed Soleyman in 1960.

== Arrests in Masjed Soleyman Municipality ==
The Public Prosecutor and Islamic Revolution of Masjed Soleyman city reported on July 7, 2023, the arrest of a member of the Islamic Council of Masjed Soleyman city. In the continuation of the preliminary investigation regarding the financial corruption case of Masjed Soleyman municipality, the prosecutor of this city announced the arrest of the head of the Islamic Council of the city on August 10, 2023. The former supervisor of Masjed Soleyman Municipality and two other members of the Islamic Council of Masjed Soleyman were also arrested and sent to prison between 13 and 21 September.

5 substitute members of Masjed Soleyman Islamic Council were introduced by the decision of the Dispute Resolution and Grievance Handling Board of Khuzestan Province Councils on October 24, 2023 instead of the 5 previously arrested members.

== List of mayors ==
At the beginning of the establishment of Masjed Soleyman municipality, the position of mayor was introduced by the center (Tehran), and with the establishment of state and provincial associations, the mayor was appointed or removed by the vote of the city association.

From 1960 to before the 1979 revolution, the mayors of Masjed Soleyman are as follows.

Mayors of Suleiman Mosque before the 1357 revolution
first name and last name	Tenure time
Ali Asghar Nouri Fayazi	1960 to 1961
Hossein Ziai	1961 to 1966
Abdul Reza Nusrat	1961 to 1961
Abdul Nabi Behnam	1966 to 1968
Ali Asghar Soleimani Nouri	1968 to 1969
Mohammad Ibrahim Ahmadi	1969 to 1970
Dara Hazini Bahramabadi	1970 to 1972
Seyyed Mohammad Jandaghi	1972 to 1973
Iraj Hashemi	1973 to 1974
Seyyed Mohammad Hossein Ziaei	1974 to 1975
Alidad Taghipour	1975 to 1976
Ali Moghimi	1976 to 1978

After the revolution of 1979 until now, the following people have been appointed to the position of the municipality of Masjed Soleyman.

the mayor	Beginning	End	Period
Seyyed Mohammad Nikorosh	1978	1980	1 year
Seyed Mohsen Jozi	1980	1983	3 years
Ali Akbar Dehkordi	1983	1985	2 years
Darvish Ali Karimi	1985	1988	3 years
Seyed Hamid Hassanzadeh	1988	1990	2 years
Gholam Reza Sorahi	1990	1992	2 years
Abdul Reza Alami Nisi	1992	1996	4 years
Adl Hashemi	1996	1999	3 years
Ghulam Zamanpour	1999	2001	2 years
Firdous Karimi Alkohi	2001	2004	3 years
Seyyed Rasool Salehi	2004	2007	3 years
Ali Madd Hashempour	2007	2009	2 years
Mehrab Philosopher	2009	2012	3 years
Peyman Molai	2012	2013	1 year
Khalil Heydari	2013	2016	3 years
Abdullah Ghasemi Saleh Babri	June 2016	August 2017	1 year
Shaham Soleimani	December 2017	September 2019	2 years
Navid Shabani	12 September 2019	September 2020	1 year
Peyman Molai	November 2020	August 2021	1 year
Arash Ghanbari	December 2022	February 2023	1 year
Mohammad Khosravi	June 2024	Now	

== See also ==
Media related to Masjed Soleyman at Wikimedia Commons

Masjed Solayman travel guide from Wikivoyage
