= Sleiman Traboulsi =

Lebanese politician (died 2021)

Lebanese Minister of Electrical and Water Resources
- In office 4 December 1998 – 26 October 2000
- Prime Minister: Selim Hoss
- Preceded by: Elie Hobeika
- Succeeded by: Muhammad Baydoun

Personal details
- Died: 16 February 2021

Sleiman Traboulsi (died 16 February 2021) was a Lebanese politician and magistrate. He served as President of the Court of Audit of Lebanon until his appointment as Minister of Electrical and Water Resources by Prime Minister Selim Hoss, where he served from 1998 to 2000.
