= Canadian Journal of Ophthalmology =

- Discipline: Ophthalmology
- Language: English
- Edited by: Varun Chaudhary

Publication details
- History: 1966–present
- Publisher: Canadian Ophthalmological Society (Canada)
- Frequency: Bimonthly
- Open access: Yes
- Impact factor: 2.3 (2025)

Standard abbreviations
- ISO 4: Can. J. Ophthalmol.

Indexing
- CODEN: CAJOBA
- ISSN: 0008-4182 (print); 1715-3360 (web)

Links
- Journal homepage; Online access; Online archive

The Canadian Journal of Ophthalmology is a peer-reviewed medical journal and the official journal of the Canadian Ophthalmological Society. It covers all aspects of ophthalmology.

The journal is abstracted and indexed in Science Citation Index Expanded, Embase, MEDLINE, and Scopus.
