= Investigative Ophthalmology & Visual Science =

- Discipline: Ophthalmology
- Language: English
- Edited by: Joseph Carroll, Ph.D.

Publication details
- Former name: Investigative Ophthalmology
- History: 1962–present
- Publisher: Association for Research in Vision and Ophthalmology (United States)
- Frequency: Continuously
- Impact factor: 5.0 (2023)

Standard abbreviations
- ISO 4: Investig. Ophthalmol. Vis. Sci.
- NLM: Invest Ophthalmol Vis Sci

Indexing
- ISSN: 0146-0404 (print); 1552-5783 (web)

Links
- Journal homepage

Investigative Ophthalmology & Visual Science (IOVS) is an online journal published by the Association for Research in Vision and Ophthalmology (ARVO).

== History ==
The journal was established as an official publication of the Association for Research in Ophthalmology (later renamed the Association for Research in Vision and Ophthalmology). The first issue of Investigative Ophthalmology was published in January 1962, with Bernard Becker, MD, as the Executive Editor. The title was changed to Investigative Ophthalmology & Visual Science in 1977.

Abstracts from the ARVO Annual Meeting have been published as an issue of IOVS since 1977.

Also in 1977, IOVS was accepted for inclusion in Index Medicus (and later in MEDLINE) and PubMed.

IOVS was first published online in 1999, with scanned back content being made available online in 2005. The last print issue was published in 2009, and the journal is now published online only.

In January 2016, IOVS ended its subscription program and became open access. All content is freely available to read, and content published 2016-onward is freely available for reuse under either the Creative Commons Attribution-NonCommercial-NoDerivatives license or Creative Commons Attribution license.

== Editors ==
- 1962–1972: Bernard Becker
- 1973–1977: Herbert E. Kaufman
- 1978–1982: Alan M. Laties
- 1983–1987: Steven M. Podos
- 1988–1992: J. Terry Ernest
- 1993–1997: Harry A. Quigley
- 1998–2002: Gerald J. Chader
- 2003–2007: Robert N. Frank
- 2008–2012: Paul L. Kaufman
- 2013–2015: David C. Beebe
- 2015–2017: Thomas Yorio
- 2017-2022: Donald C. Hood
- 2023-2027: Joseph Carroll

== See also ==
- Journal of Vision
