= The Physician and Sportsmedicine =

- Discipline: Sports medicine
- Language: English

Publication details
- History: 1973–present
- Publisher: Informa Healthcare
- Frequency: Quarterly

Standard abbreviations
- ISO 4: Physician Sportsmed.

Indexing
- CODEN: PHSPDE
- ISSN: 0091-3847 (print); 2326-3660 (web)
- LCCN: 73644162
- OCLC no.: 01787159

Links
- Journal homepage; Journal page at publisher's website; Online archive

The Physician and Sportsmedicine is a quarterly peer-reviewed medical journal covering sports medicine. It is published by Informa Healthcare and was established in 1973. The journal is abstracted and indexed in Index Medicus/MEDLINE/PubMed.
