= Pediatric ophthalmology =

Field of medicine treating eye disorders in children

Pediatric ophthalmology is a sub-specialty of ophthalmology concerned with eye diseases, visual development, and vision care in children.

== Training ==
In Australia and New Zealand, physicians train through the Royal Australian and New Zealand College of Ophthalmologists, which sets the Pediatric Ophthalmology Curriculum Standard.

In the United States, pediatric ophthalmologists are physicians who have completed medical school, a 1-year internship, 3-year residency in ophthalmology, and a 1-year fellowship in pediatric ophthalmology and strabismus. Pediatric ophthalmology fellowships in the United States are accredited by the American Association for Pediatric Ophthalmology and Strabismus.

== Clinical expertise ==
Pediatric ophthalmologists focus on the development of the visual system and the various diseases that disrupt visual development in children. Pediatric ophthalmologists also have expertise in managing the various ocular diseases that affect children. Pediatric ophthalmologists are qualified to perform complex eye surgery as well as to manage children's eye problems using glasses and medications. Many ophthalmologists and other physicians refer pediatric patients to a pediatric ophthalmologist for examination and management of ocular problems due to children's unique needs. In addition to children with obvious vision problems, children with head turns, head tilts, squinting of the eyes, or preferred head postures (torticollis) are typically referred to a pediatric ophthalmologist for evaluation. Pediatric ophthalmologists typically also manage adults with eye movement disorders (such as nystagmus or strabismus) due to their familiarity with strabismus conditions.

== Eye problems in children ==
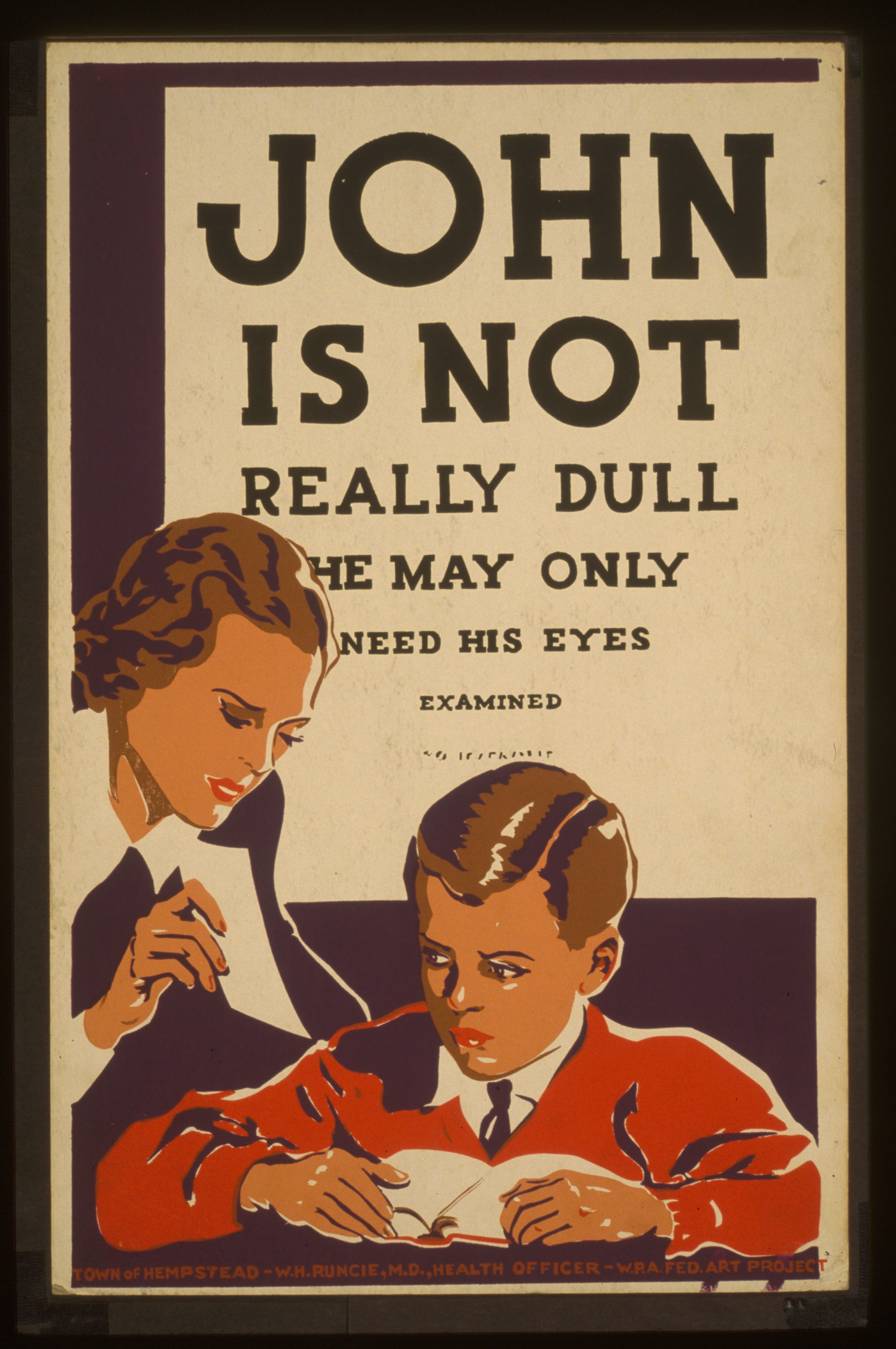
Public education poster urging eye exams for children (Works Progress Administration, circa 1937)

Children experience a variety of eye problems, many quite distinct from adult eye diseases. Pediatric ophthalmologists are specially trained to manage the following disorders:

- Infections (Conjunctivitis).
- Strabismus is a misalignment of the eyes that affects 2-4% of the population; it is often associated with amblyopia. The inward turning gaze commonly referred to as "crossed-eyes" is an example of strabismus. The term strabismus applies to other types of misalignments, including an upward, downward, or outward turning eye.
- Amblyopia (aka lazy eye) occurs when the vision of one eye is significantly better than the other eye, and the brain begins to rely on the better eye and ignore the weaker one. Amblyopia affects 4% of the population and is clinically diagnosed when the refractive error of one eye is more than 1.5 diopters different from the other eye (anisometropia) or one of the eye is misaligned for a long period of time (Strabismus). The management of amblyopia involves correcting of significant refractive errors and using techniques that encourage the brain to pay attention to the weaker eye such as patching the stronger eye (occlusion therapy).
- Blocked tear ducts.
- Ptosis
- Retinopathy of prematurity
- Nystagmus
- Visual inattention
- Pediatric cataracts
- Pediatric glaucoma
- Abnormal vision development
- Genetic disorders often cause eye problems for affected children. Since approximately 30% of genetic syndromes affect the eyes, examination by a pediatric ophthalmologist can help with the diagnosis of genetic conditions. Many pediatric ophthalmologists participate with multi-disciplinary medical teams that treat children with genetic syndromes.
- Congenital malformations affecting vision or the tear drainage duct system can be evaluated and possibly surgically corrected by a pediatric ophthalmologist.
- Orbital tumours
- Refractive errors such as myopia (near-sightedness), hyperopia (far-sightedness) and astigmatism can often be corrected with prescriptions for glasses or contacts.
- Accommodative insufficiency
- Convergence insufficiency and asthenopia
- Evaluation of visual issues in education, including dyslexia and attention deficit disorder.

Pediatric ophthalmologists often work in conjunction with orthoptists in the treatment of strabismus.

== History ==
Frank D. Costenbader was an American physician frequently credited as the world's first pediatric ophthalmologist. Costenbader and Marshall M. Parks (his mentee who would later be known to many as "the father of pediatric ophthalmology") began the first ophthalmology fellowship trained program of any subspecialty at the Children's Hospital in Washington, D.C., now known as the Children's National Medical Center. Parks trained many pediatric ophthalmologists during his career and was instrumental in the establishment of the American Association for Pediatric Ophthalmology and Strabismus, a national organization dedicated to improving the quality and management of pediatric ocular disease. Over time, over 30 programs were developed for the training of pediatric ophthalmologists throughout the United States. The American Academy of Pediatric Ophthalmology and Strabismus works with the American Academy of Pediatrics on issues related to pediatric eye disease and vision screening guidelines.

Other notable pediatric ophthalmologists have included: Jack Crawford, John T. Flynn, David S. Friendly, Eugene R. Folk, David Guyton, Robison D. Harley, Eugene Helveston, Arthur Jampolsky, Barrie Jay, Phillip Knapp, Burton J. Kushner, Henry Metz, Marilyn T. Miller, John Pratt-Johnson, Arthur Rosenbaum, William E. Scott, Gunter K. von Noorden, Mette Warburg, and Abbas Bagheri Lotfabad.

== See also ==
- Eye exam
- Infant vision
- Ophthalmoscope
- Orthoptics
- Refractive surgery#Children
- School vision screening
- Strabismus surgery
- Visual acuity
