= Association for Research in Vision and Ophthalmology =

American learned society

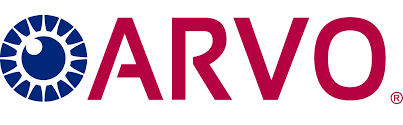
- LOGO of ARVO
- Abbreviation: ARVO
- Formation: 1928
- Founded at: Washington, D.C.
- Professional title: FARVO
- Headquarters: Rockville, Maryland
- Fields: Ophthalmology
- Members: Nearly 12,000 (2019)
- President: Terri Young
- Vice President: Tien Wong
- Revenue: $12.17 million USD (2025)
- Website: www.arvo.org
- Formerly called: Association for Research in Ophthalmology (ARO)

The Association for Research in Vision and Ophthalmology (abbreviated ARVO) is an American learned society dedicated to ophthalmology and other vision-related topics. It is based in Rockville, Maryland.

== Overview ==
The association was established in Washington, D.C., in 1928 as the Association for Research in Ophthalmology (ARO). In May 1970, it was renamed to its current name to reflect its broader scope. As of 2019, it has almost 12,000 members from 75 different countries.

== Publications ==
The society publishes three academic journals: Investigative Ophthalmology & Visual Science, the Journal of Vision, and Translational Vision Science & Technology.

== Annual Meetings ==
Between 1930 and 1971, ARO held an annual meeting, usually as part of some other conference, such as that of the American Medical Association, at which members presented their research. In 1972, the annual meetings began to be organized by ARVO, and were held in the spring, in Sarasota Florida. In 1995, the meetings moved to Fort Lauderdale until 2013 when the meeting was in various locations including Honolulu and virtually in 2021.
