= Progress in Retinal and Eye Research =

- Discipline: Ophthalmology
- Language: English
- Edited by: Alan Stitt

Publication details
- Former name: Progress in Retinal Research
- History: 1994–present
- Publisher: Elsevier
- Frequency: Bimonthly
- Impact factor: 16.2 (2025)

Standard abbreviations
- ISO 4: Prog. Retin. Eye Res.

Indexing
- ISSN: 1873-1635

Links
- Journal homepage

Progress in Retinal and Eye Research is a bimonthly peer-reviewed medical journal covering all aspects of ophthalmology. It was established in 1994 by Elsevier.

== Abstracting and indexing ==
The journal is abstracted and indexed in the Science Citation Index Expanded and Scopus. According to the Journal Citation Reports, the journal has a 2025 impact factor of 16.2.

The journal’s Editor-in-Chief is Alan Stitt, who is also an elected board member of the Society of Eye Journal Editors (SEJE).
