= Survey of Ophthalmology =

- Discipline: Ophthalmology
- Language: English
- Edited by: John Gittinger Jr.

Publication details
- History: 1956–present
- Publisher: Elsevier
- Frequency: Bimonthly
- Impact factor: 6.8 (2025)

Standard abbreviations
- ISO 4: Surv. Ophthalmol.

Indexing
- CODEN: SUOPAD
- ISSN: 0039-6257 (print); 1879-3304 (web)
- OCLC no.: 01766871

Links
- Journal homepage

Survey of Ophthalmology is a review journal dedicated to publishing reviews of ophthalmological topics by established authorities in that particular field. It is a strictly refereed journal with a bi-monthly publication schedule. The procedure of evaluating and inviting specific topics is done primarily by selecting current academics with a record of innovative and original research, supported by publications in international peer journals.

The journal is a clinically oriented review journal that keeps ophthalmologists up to date through expert-authored, peer-reviewed reviews on clinically important topics. It also publishes feature articles, section reviews, book reviews, and abstracts.

The Journal is indexed in Scopus, Medline, Science Citation Index Expanded.

== See also ==
- Archives of Ophthalmology
- Investigative Ophthalmology & Visual Science
- List of medical journals
