= Journal of Pediatric Ophthalmology and Strabismus =

- Discipline: Ophthalmology
- Language: English
- Edited by: Rudolph S. Wagner and Leonard B. Nelson

Publication details
- History: 1964–present
- Publisher: SLACK Incorporated
- Frequency: Monthly
- Impact factor: 0.979 (2017)

Standard abbreviations
- ISO 4: J. Pediatr. Ophthalmol. Strabismus

Indexing
- CODEN: JPOSD
- ISSN: 0191-3913 (print); 1938-2405 (web)
- OCLC no.: 03951436

Links
- Journal homepage; Online archive

The Journal of Pediatric Ophthalmology and Strabismus is a bimonthly peer-reviewed publication for pediatric ophthalmologists. The journal publishes articles regarding eye disorders in pediatric individuals and the treatment of strabismus in all age groups.

== History ==
The journal was established as a quarterly journal in 1964. The current editors-in-chief are Rudolph S. Wagner and Leonard B. Nelson.

== Abstracting and indexing ==
The journal is abstracted and indexed in:

- Current Contents/Clinical Medicine
- EBSCO databases
- Embase
- MEDLINE/PubMed
- ProQuest databases
- Science Citation Index Expanded
- Scopus
- Social Sciences Citation Index

According to the Journal Citation Reports, the journal has a 2017 impact factor of 0.979.
