= American Association for Pediatric Ophthalmology and Strabismus =

The American Association for Pediatric Ophthalmology and Strabismus (AAPOS) is an academic association of pediatric ophthalmologists and strabismus surgeons. The pediatric ophthalmology fellowships in the United States are accredited by the AAPOS. International members are also allowed based on evident valuable contributions and dedication to the field of pediatric ophthalmology.

The association also publishes the Journal of AAPOS as its official publication. The journal presents papers on children's eye diseases and on strabismus. The journal is abstracted and indexed in Chemical Abstracts Service, Embase, ProQuest databases, PubMed, Web of Science, and Scopus.

== Past presidents ==
| President | Annual meeting | Year |
|---|---|---|
| R. Michael Siatkowski | San Diego, CA | 2018-2019 |
| Derek T. Sprunger | Washington DC | 2017-2018 |
| Robert E. Wiggins, Jr | Nashville, TN | 2016-2017 |
| M. Edward Wilson, Jr | Vancouver, BC, Canada | 2015-2016 |
| Sherwin J. Isenberg | New Orleans, LA | 2014-2015 |
| Sharon F. Freedman | Palm Springs, CA | 2013-2014 |
| K. David Epley | Boston, MA | 2012-2013 |
| Steven E. Rubin | San Antonio, TX | 2011-2012 |
| David A. Plager | San Diego, CA | 2010-2011 |
| C. Gail Summers | Orlando, FL | 2009-2010 |
| Bradley C. Black | San Francisco, CA | 2008-2009 |
| Edward G. Buckley | Seattle, WA | 2007-2008 |
| Christie L. Morse | Seattle, WA | 2006-2007 |
| Michael X. Repka | Keystone, CO | 2005-2006 |
| Susan H. Day | Orlando, FL | 2004-2005 |
| George S. Ellis, Jr | Washington, DC | 2003-2004 |
| Joseph H. Calhoun | Waikoloa, HI | 2002-2003 |
| Jane D. Kivlin | Seattle, WA | 2001-2002 |
| Albert W. Biglan | Orlando, FL | 2000-2001 |
| Maynard B. Wheeler | San Diego, CA | 1999-2000 |
| Marilyn T. Miller | Toronto, Canada | 1998-1999 |
| John W. Simon | Palm Springs, CA | 1997-1998 |
| Earl A. Palmer | Charleston, SC | 1996-1997 |
| John D. Baker | Snowbird, UT | 1995-1996 |
| Malcolm L. Mazow | Orlando, FL | 1994-1995 |
| David L. Guyton | Vancouver, BC, Canada | 1993-1994 |
| Forrest D. Ellis | Palm Springs, CA | 1992-1993 |
| John T. Flynn | Maui, HI | 1991-1992 |
| Henry S. Metz | Montreal, QC, Canada | 1990-1991 |
| Eugene M. Helveston | Lake George, NY | 1989-1990 |
| William E. Scott | Kiawah, HI | 1988-1989 |
| Arthur L. Rosenbaum | Boston, MA | 1987-1988 |
| Gunter K. von Noorden | Scottsdale, AZ | 1986-1987 |
| Thomas D. France | Maui, HI | 1985-1986 |
| Eugene R. Folk | Puerto Rico | 1984-1985 |
| John A. Pratt-Johnson | Vail, CO | 1983-1984 |
| Alfred G. Smith | Vancouver, BC, Canada | 1982-1983 |
| Arthur Jampolsky | Monterey, CA | 1981-1982 |
| Webb Chamberlain | Orlando, FL | 1980-1981 |
| Phillip Knapp | San Diego, CA | 1979-1980 |
| David S. Friendly | Toronto, ON, Canada | 1978-1980 |
| Robison D. Harley | Williamsburg, VA | 1977-1978 |
| Jack C. Crawford | San Francisco, CA | 1876-1977 |
| Robert D. Reinecke | Bermuda | 1975-1976 |
| Marshall M. Parks | Lake Tahoe, NV | 1974-1975 |

== See also ==
- Pediatric ophthalmology
- Infant vision
- Orthoptics
- International Orthoptic Association
