= Journal of Vision =

- Discipline: Neuroscience, Psychology, Vision
- Language: English
- Edited by: Dennis M. Levi, OD, PhD

Publication details
- History: 2001–present
- Publisher: Association for Research in Vision and Ophthalmology (United States)
- Frequency: Continuously
- Open access: Yes
- License: CC BY or BY-NC-ND
- Impact factor: 2.0 (2023)

Standard abbreviations
- ISO 4: J. Vis.

Indexing
- ISSN: 1534-7362
- OCLC no.: 46764959

Links
- Journal homepage

Journal of Vision is an open access online scientific journal specializing in the neuroscience and psychology of the visual system. It publishes primary research from any discipline within the visual sciences. Submissions go through pre-publication peer review and are indexed in PubMed.
