= Illinois Eye and Ear Infirmary =

Geography
- Location: 1855/1905 W Taylor St. Chicago, Illinois, United States

Organization
- Type: Specialty, teaching
- Affiliated university: University of Illinois College of Medicine

Services
- Emergency department: Eye trauma

History
- Founded: May 1858

Links
- Website: eyecare.uic.edu
- Lists: Hospitals in Illinois

The Illinois Eye & Ear Infirmary (IEEI) is a center of ophthalmology and otolaryngology research and clinical practice at the University of Illinois College of Medicine.

Located in the Illinois Medical District, the Illinois Eye and Ear Infirmary is the major referral center in the Chicago metropolitan area for eye emergencies and the only Level 1 eye trauma center in the region. The General Eye Clinic also serves as the only emergency eye clinic in all of Chicago. The Chicago Curriculum in Ophthalmology (CCO) meets at the Infirmary where all Chicago area ophthalmology residents are invited. The Illinois Eye Review is also held at the Infirmary. The Infirmary is one of the oldest hospitals of its kind in treatment of disorders of the eye, ear, nose, throat, and head/neck. The Infirmary houses the departments of ophthalmology and otolaryngology of the University of Illinois College of Medicine.

LASIK surgery was invented by Gholam A. Peyman, while he served as the Professor of Ophthalmology at the Illinois Eye and Ear Infirmary.

The Department of Ophthalmology has a NIH-funded K12 research program, one of only 7 in the United States. There are partnerships with global programs through Dr. Marilyn Miller, including exchange programs with Keio University in Tokyo and the Federal University of São Paulo. Other exchange programs exist with Nigeria, India, Brazil, Thailand, Iran, Philippines, Guatemala, and Nepal. The Millennium Park Eye Center is staffed by faculty affiliated with the Illinois Eye and Ear Infirmary.

== History ==
=== 19th century ===
The Illinois Eye and Ear Infirmary was founded in May 1858 by a 30-year-old physician named Edward Lorenzo Holmes as the Chicago Charitable Eye and Ear Infirmary. The Infirmary took up just a single room in a frame building at 60 North Clark Street in Chicago, and the first patient arrived before the room was even ready. That initial year of operation, the Infirmary had 95 eye patient visits. Most of the patients were afflicted with eye infections.

The private organization was registered as an infirmary association, with a slate of officers and 12 trustees. An influential group of physicians and philanthropists guided the association until the state of Illinois took over the Infirmary's operations in 1871. The name then changed to the Illinois Charitable Eye and Ear Infirmary (“Charitable” later was removed from the name because paying patients also were accepted). In 1874, the name became the Illinois Eye and Ear Infirmary.

The Infirmary was totally destroyed by the Chicago Fire of October 9, 1871. Temporary quarters were set up at 137 N. Morgan Street; in 1874 a new building was inaugurated at the corner of Peoria and west Adams street, at a cost of over $40,000.

When the University of Illinois College of Medicine's predecessor, the College of Physicians and Surgeons of Chicago, opened in 1882, the Illinois Eye and Ear Infirmary (IEEI) began its long academic affiliation with the University. However, several government officials thwarted efforts for years to bring the Infirmary into the University Hospitals system. Finally in 1943, the IEEI and the University formally agreed to joint operations.

=== 20th century ===
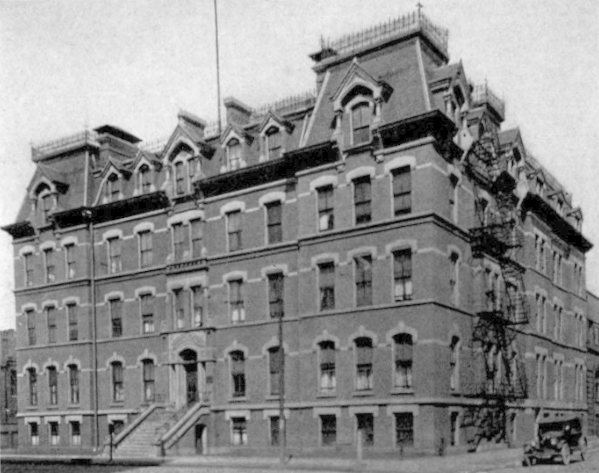
Building at West Adams and South Peoria Streets in 1922

In 1939, the Illinois Eye and Ear Infirmary began one of the nation's first glaucoma specialty clinics. In 1965, the Infirmary moved to the University's West Side Medical Campus, to its current location on Taylor Street. The University's Research and Education (R&E) Hospitals still ran a separate ophthalmology service until 1970, when it was merged into the Infirmary's ophthalmology department.

On October 19, 1965, new facilities for the Illinois Eye and Ear Infirmary were formally dedicated by Illinois Governor Otto Kerner, the result of efforts by Ophthalmology department head Peter C. Kronfeld, MD, Otolaryngology department head Francis L. Lederer, MD, and Lester R. Gerber, Superintendent of the Infirmary since 1946.

Morton F. Goldberg, head of ophthalmology from 1970 to 1989, increased full-time faculty from one to 25, added numerous ophthalmic subspecialty clinics and a postresidency fellowship program, and began a residency surgical rotation in Madurai, India. Dr. Gholam A. Peyman pioneered LASIK surgery at this time. During this period, the Lions of Illinois funded $5 million of the $6.8 million cost of building the Lions of Illinois Eye Research Institute—the largest single donation ever given to the department. When the 30,000-square-foot (2,800 m^{2}) institute opened in 1985, it was heralded as the most comprehensive eye research center in the Midwest.

In 1985, the Lions of Illinois Eye Research Institute (LIERI) opened at the University of Illinois Eye and Ear Infirmary through a generous donation from the Lions Clubs of Illinois. The institute is part of the Department of Ophthalmology and Visual Sciences and has research laboratories, offices, computer services, core facilities for machine shop, imaging, tissue culture and molecular biology research, and one of the largest ophthalmology libraries in the country. Research efforts at LIERI are supported by both private and national grant-funding agencies and by the Department of Ophthalmology and Visual Sciences. LIERI also houses patient care facilities in the Edwin and Lois Deicke Eye Center.

While the Department of Otolaryngology-Head and Neck Surgery existed for the better part of a century before 1933, in that year it became a freestanding department for the first time, headed initially by Joseph C. Beck, M.D., then in 1934 by Francis Lederer, M.D., who led the Department for 33 years. Dr. Beck had been Dr. Lederer's childhood physician and served as his mentor in clinical and administrative matters, as well as a leader in plastic and reconstructive surgery. Dr. Lederer joined the Department in 1922, served as its acting head in 1925, and became board-certified in Otolaryngology-Head and Neck Surgery in 1926. He contributed greatly to the institution and the field, including for his service during World War II, for which he was recognized by President Harry Truman. Author of the landmark book Diseases of the Ear, Nose, and Throat, Dr. Lederer was a mentor for many in the program who became leaders in the field, including Eugene Tardy, M.D.

=== 21st century ===
The Illinois Eye and Ear Infirmary is currently chaired by Dr. R.V. Paul Chan, a Retina specialist.
