= American Journal of Ophthalmology =

- Discipline: Ophthalmology
- Language: English
- Edited by: Richard K. Parrish II

Publication details
- History: 1884–present
- Publisher: Elsevier
- Frequency: Monthly
- Impact factor: 4.7 (2025)

Standard abbreviations
- ISO 4: Am. J. Ophthalmol.

Indexing
- CODEN: AJOPAA
- ISSN: 0002-9394
- LCCN: 62002360
- OCLC no.: 848508794

Links
- Journal homepage; Journal page at publisher's website; Online archive

American Journal of Ophthalmology is a monthly peer-reviewed medical journal covering ophthalmology. It was established in 1884 and is published by Elsevier. The editor-in-chief is Richard K. Parrish II (Bascom Palmer Eye Institute).

== Indexing and abstracting ==
The journal is indexed and abstracted in the following databases:

- BIOSIS Previews
- Chemical Abstracts
- Current Contents/Clinical Medicine
- Current Contents/Life Sciences
- Embase
- Excerpta Medica
- MEDLINE/PubMed
- PsycINFO
- Science Citation Index
- Scopus
- Social Sciences Citation Index

== See also ==
- British Journal of Ophthalmology
- Ophthalmology
