= Ophthalmology (journal) =

- Discipline: Ophthalmology
- Language: English
- Edited by: Bennie H. Jeng

Publication details
- History: 1978–present
- Publisher: Elsevier on behalf of the American Academy of Ophthalmology (United States)
- Frequency: Monthly
- Impact factor: 10.9 (2025)

Standard abbreviations
- ISO 4: Ophthalmology

Indexing
- CODEN: OPHTDG
- ISSN: 0161-6420 (print); 1549-4713 (web)
- LCCN: 78005685
- OCLC no.: 03661682

Links
- Journal homepage

Ophthalmology is a monthly peer-reviewed medical journal published by Elsevier on behalf of the American Academy of Ophthalmology. It covers all aspects of ophthalmology.

== Editors ==
The following persons are or have been editor-in-chief:

- Bennie H. Jeng (2026–present)
- Russell N. Van Gelder (2022–2025)
- Stephen McLeod (2017–2022)
- George B. Bartley (2012–2017)
- Andrew P. Schachat (2003–2012)
- Donald S. Minckler (1995–2003)

== Family of Journals ==
On June 6, 2016, The American Academy of Ophthalmology announced plans to launch Ophthalmology Retina as an extension of the journal Ophthalmology. This new journal was planned in response to the growing volume of research within the retina subspecialty of ophthalmology, and will be a print and online publication.
