= Frank D. Costenbader =

American physician

Frank Duncan Costenbader (1905 - March 19, 1978) was an American physician frequently credited as the world's first pediatric ophthalmologist. He died on March 16, 1978, at his home in Washington following a stroke.
