= Fellowship (medicine) =

Medical training following postgraduate

A fellowship is the period of medical training in the United States and Canada that a physician, dentist, or veterinarian may undertake after completing a specialty training program (residency). During this time (usually more than one year), the trainee is known as a fellow or fellow physician. Fellows are capable of acting as an attending physician or a consultant physician in the specialist field in which they were trained, such as internal medicine or pediatrics. After completing a fellowship in the relevant sub-specialty, the physician is permitted to practice without direct supervision by other physicians in that sub-specialty, such as cardiology or oncology.

== United States ==
In the US, the majority of fellowships are accredited by the Accreditation Council for Graduate Medical Education ("ACGME") or, to a lesser extent, the American Board of Physician Specialties in select states. There are fellowship programs that are not ACGME accredited, yet are well received, given the importance of being a Board-Certified Physician in a primary specialty, where a Fellowship is often more based on demand and research productivity. Not ACGME accredited means that accreditation is not available for specialty/subspecialty or has not been obtained by the program or accreditation by a professional organization or accrediting body other than the ACGME is not sufficient to consider the program accredited or program that provide clinical training to physician. (Exceptions to this include clinical residency programs for PhDs that require approval by their accrediting body by the UWSOM and Sponsoring Institution Designated Institutional Official (DIO)) or program with a training component directly related to medical education or clinical practice.

=== Requirements ===
In general, ACGME accredited programs require completion of ACGME-accredited, RCPSC-accredited or CFPC- accredited residency program, however, exceptions for an ACGME-International- accredited residency programs and non-ACGME-accredited residency programs are possible. International medical graduates must complete residency or fellowship training in the home country, be ECFMG certified, and complete Step 3. Some fellowship specialties require participation in special matching programs such as Specialties Matching Service (SMS) or SF Match. However most of the non-ACGME-accredited fellowships do not take part in any match program.

=== Combined fellowships ===
There are a number of programs offering a combined fellowship, training in two or more sub-specialties as part of a single program. For example:

- Pulmonary/Critical Care: this type of program is more common than Pulmonary Disease (non-combination) programs. As of 2026, there were 239 ACGME-accredited combined Pulmonary/Critical Care programs while only 16 programs for Pulmonary Disease alone.
- Hematology/Oncology: - 213 ACGME-accredited programs.
- Geriatrics/Oncology: the American Board of Internal Medicine approved a 3-year combined fellowship training program in medical oncology and geriatrics.

== See also ==
- Medical intern
- Medical specialty
- Physician specialty codes
- Society of General Internal Medicine
- Internship (medicine)
- Residency (medicine)
- Attending physician
