= American Academy of Ophthalmology =

Ophthalmology organization

- Formation: 1896 (AAOO); 1979 (AAO)
- Type: Professional association
- Headquarters: 655 Beach Street; San Francisco, California
- Coordinates: 37.806675°N 122.419992°W
- Region served: Worldwide
- Members: 32,000
- Website: www.aao.org

The American Academy of Ophthalmology is a professional medical association of ophthalmologists. It is headquartered in San Francisco, California. Its membership of 32,000 medical doctors includes more than 90 percent of practicing ophthalmologists in the United States as well as over 7,000 members abroad.

The academy's stated mission is "to protect sight and empower lives by serving as an advocate for patients and the public, leading ophthalmic education, and advancing the profession of ophthalmology."

== History ==
The academy has its origins in the American Academy of Ophthalmology and Otolaryngology (AAOO), founded in 1896 as a medical association of both ophthalmologists and otolaryngologists. The Academy was founded when the AAOO split in 1979 and divided into separate academies for each specialty. Like most medical associations, the Academy collects dues, provides continuing education and seminars for its members, including its four-day annual meeting. Outside the medical community it promotes public health information. Also, like most other medical associations, the Academy takes public policy stances on issues through lobbying (carried out by its Washington, D.C.–based Governmental Affairs Division).

In 2006, the academy launched EyeSmart, a program to educate the public about the importance of eye health. The EyeSmart website, which was relaunched in 2016, provides ophthalmologist-reviewed information about eye diseases, conditions and injuries.

In 2010, the academy sponsored the creation of EyeWiki, a wiki-model Internet encyclopedia of ophthalmology written and edited by ophthalmologists and "ophthalmologists-in-training".
