= Reza Dana =

American ophthalmologist and immunologist

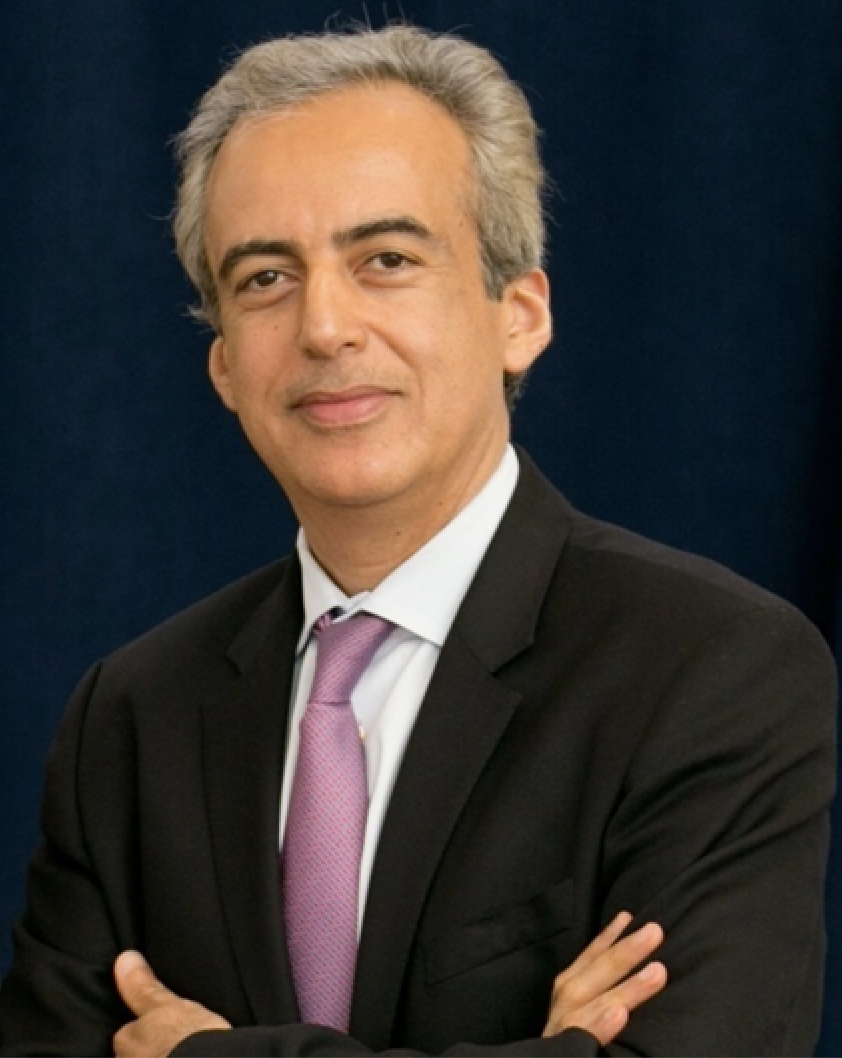
- Dana in 2019
- Education: St. Paul's School; Johns Hopkins University (BA, MD, MPH); Illinois Eye and Ear Infirmary (Residency); Wills Eye Hospital; Massachusetts Eye and Ear; Harvard University (MSc)
- Occupations: Claes H. Dohlman Chair in Ophthalmology, Harvard Medical School
- Known for: Corneal Transplantation; Ocular Trauma; Dry Eye Disease
- Medical career
- Field: Medical research, Immunology; Ophthalmology
- Institutions: Massachusetts Eye and Ear; Massachusetts General Hospital; Brigham and Women's Hospital; Harvard Medical School; Harvard University

Reza Dana is the Claes H. Dohlman Chair in Ophthalmology, Senior Scientist and W. Clement Stone Clinical Research Scholar, Director of Cornea at Massachusetts Eye and Ear, Vice Chair for Academic Programs at the Department of Ophthalmology, Harvard Medical School, and Director of the Harvard-Vision Clinical Scientist Development Program.

Dana is an internationally recognized expert in the field of corneal disorders and ocular inflammation. He is best known for his work on the mechanisms of ocular inflammation with translational applications to transplantation, autoimmunity, and angiogenesis. He is a member of editorial boards of 10 journals, including as editor-in-chief of Cornea.

== Education and training ==
Dana attended the Tehran International School during his early years and graduated summa cum laude from St. Paul's School, New Hampshire. He pursued his baccalaureate degree at Johns Hopkins University School of Arts and Sciences, where he was invited to join the Phi Beta Kappa. Dr. Dana attended medical school at Johns Hopkins School of Medicine, and also obtained a master's degree in Public Health from Johns Hopkins Bloomberg School of Public Health. He received his Ophthalmology residency training at the Illinois Eye and Ear Infirmary, and clinical cornea and external diseases fellowship at Wills Eye Hospital in Philadelphia. He received advanced fellowship training in Immunology and Uveitis at the Massachusetts Eye and Ear and pursued laboratory research training in Ocular and Transplantation Immunology Laboratory at the Schepens Eye Research Institute, Harvard Medical School under the mentorship of the late J. Wayne Streilein.

== Research and career ==
Dana joined the ophthalmology faculty at the Harvard Medical School as an Instructor in 1995 and has been a faculty member there ever since. In 2006, he was named the director of the Cornea Service at Massachusetts Eye and Ear, and in 2007, he was appointed the Claes H. Dohlman Chair in Ophthalmology and Vice Chairman for Academic Programs.

Dana's research focus is in the area of immuno-inflammatory disorders of the cornea and ocular surface. He has published over 400 peer-reviewed publications and over 150 reviews, and edited several books. His work has been cited more than 53000 times and carries an h-index of 110 as per Google Scholar. His is widely recognized for (i) identifying, phenotyping and functionally characterizing resident bone marrow-derived antigen-presenting cells (APC) of the cornea, (ii) identifying novel mechanisms of corneal APC trafficking, (iii) defining novel functional interactions between lymphatic endothelia and APC, (iv) identifying selective topical cytokine and chemokine targeting to promote transplant survival by suppressing effector T cells, (v) defining novel mechanisms employed by the corneal epithelium to maintain angiogenic privilege including the VEGFR-3 sink and PD-L1 mechanisms, (vi) developing strategies to promote corneal endothelial cell survival in transplantation, including gene therapy. (vi) demonstrating the function of memory Th17 cells in pathogenesis of ocular surface autoimmunity. (vii) evaluating the role of regulatory T cells in corneal graft tolerance. (viii) insights into the contribution of diabetes to alterations in corneal graft immunity. (ix) developing novel biomaterials for therapeutics delivery to the eye.

== Lectures, awards and honors ==
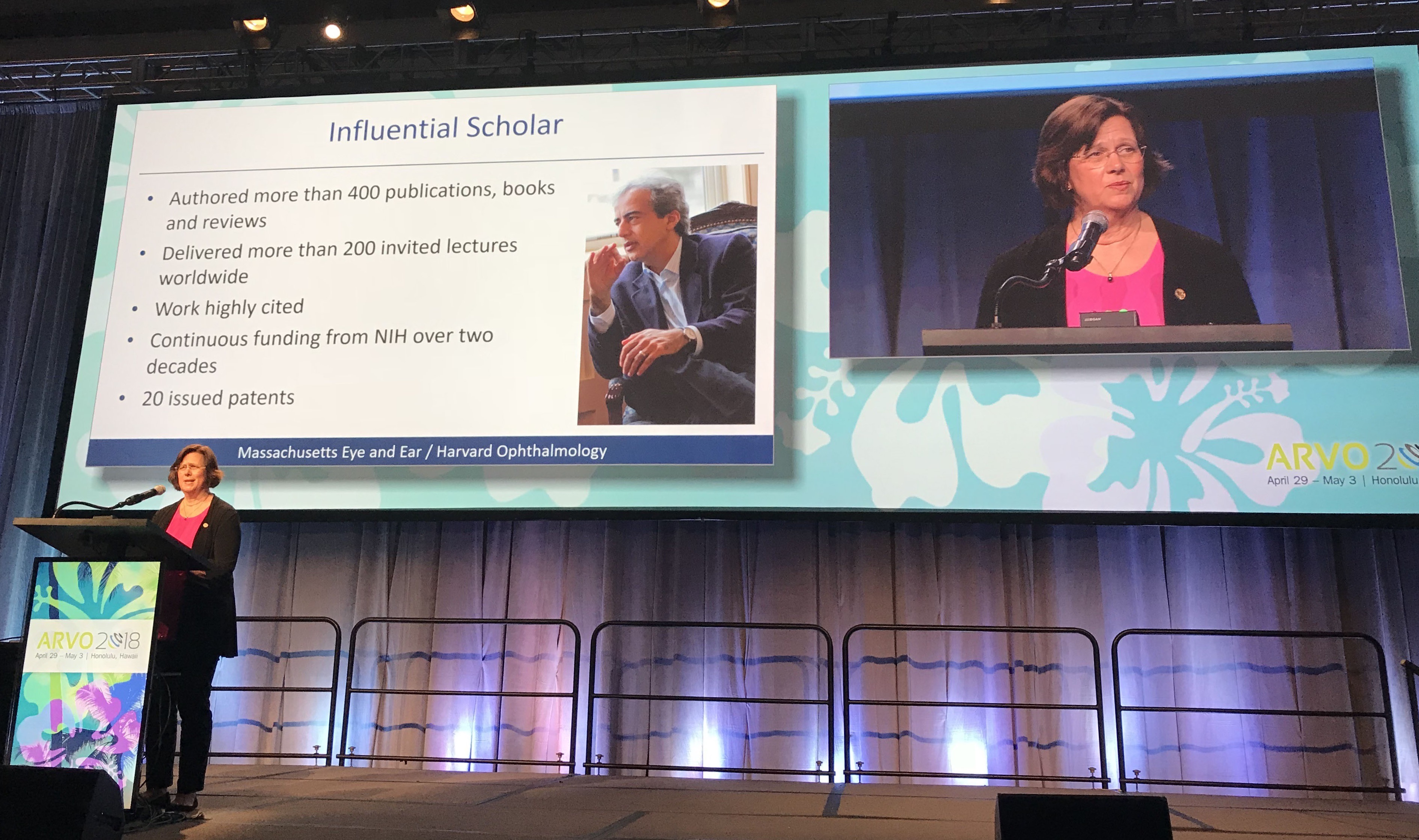
Dr.Joan Miller introducing Dr. Dana at the Friedenwald Award reception at Association for Research in Vision and Ophthalmology Annual Meeting 2018 in Honolulu.

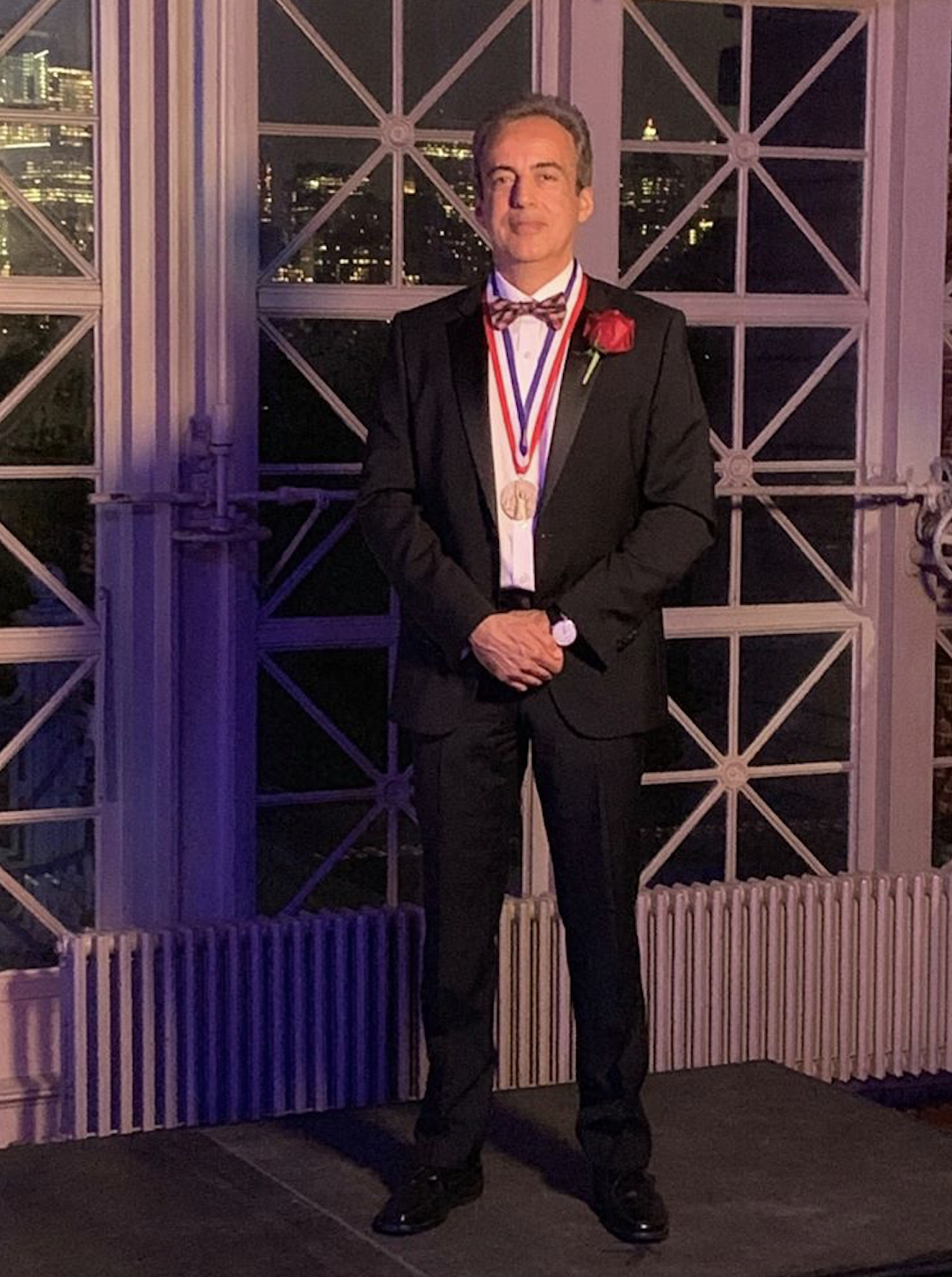
Dr. Dana receiving the Ellis Island Medal of Honor in 2019

- 1981 – National Cum Laude Society
- 1984 – Phi Beta Kappa (Junior Year), Johns Hopkins University
- 1981-85 – Dean's List (every semester), Johns Hopkins University
- 1989 – Henry Strong Dennison Award for Research, Johns Hopkins School of Medicine
- 1990 – National Eye Institute/ARVO Travel Fellowship
- 1995 – Heed Ophthalmic Foundation Fellowship (Ocular Immunology)
- 1996 – Knapp Fellow of the Society of Heed Fellows
- 1996 – Clinical Scientist Career Award (KO8) from NIH
- 1999 – Research to Prevent Blindness William & Mary Greve Special Scholar
- 2002 – Achievement Award, American Academy of Ophthalmology
- 2002 – Kronfeld Memorial Lecturer, Illinois Eye & Ear Infirmary
- 2002 – Fry Memorial Lecturer, Wills Eye Hospital Biennial Cornea Conference
- 2003 – Cogan Award, Association for Research In Vision and Ophthalmology
- 2003 – Dohlman Lecturer, Boston Biennial Cornea Conference
- 2004 – Alta Lecturer and visiting professorship, University of California San Francisco
- 2004 – Keynote Address, 28th All-Japan Cornea Conference, Yonago, Japan
- 2005 – Research to Prevent Blindness Physician Scientist-Merit Award
- 2006 – Service Recognition Award, American Academy of Ophthalmology
- 2007 – Listed, "Best Doctors of America"
- 2007 – Listed, "Best of Boston" Ophthalmologists, Boston Magazine
- 2007 – Listed, "Best Ophthalmologists of America"
- 2008 – Alcon Research Institute Award
- 2009 – Research to Prevent Blindness Lew R. Wasserman-Merit Award
- 2011 – David Easty Lecturer, Bowman Club, Royal College of Surgeons, Edinburgh
- 2011 – Joaquin Barraquer Lecture, Spanish Congress of Ophthalmology
- 2011 – LSU Chancellor's Award in Neuroscience and Ophthalmology
- 2012 – Mentoring Award, European Young Investigator Network for Ocular Surface Inflammation
- 2013 – Senior Scientific Investigator Award, Research to Prevent Blindness
- 2013 – Gold Fellow, Association for Research in Vision and Ophthalmology
- 2013 – Keynote Speaker, Biennial Meeting of the European Society of Ophthalmology, Copenhagen, Denmark
- 2014 – Thygeson Lecture, Ocular Microbiology and Immunology Group
- 2014 – A. Clifford Barger Excellence in Mentoring Award, Harvard Medical School
- 2015 – Kersley Lecture, British Ocular Surface Society, London, England
- 2015 – Keynote Address & Certificate of Honor, European Association for Vision and Eye Research, Nice, France
- 2016 – Roger Meyer Lecture, University of Michigan Kellogg Eye Center
- 2016 – Elected, Academia Ophthalmologica Internationalis
- 2016 – Mooney Lecture, Irish College of Ophthalmologists, Republic of Ireland
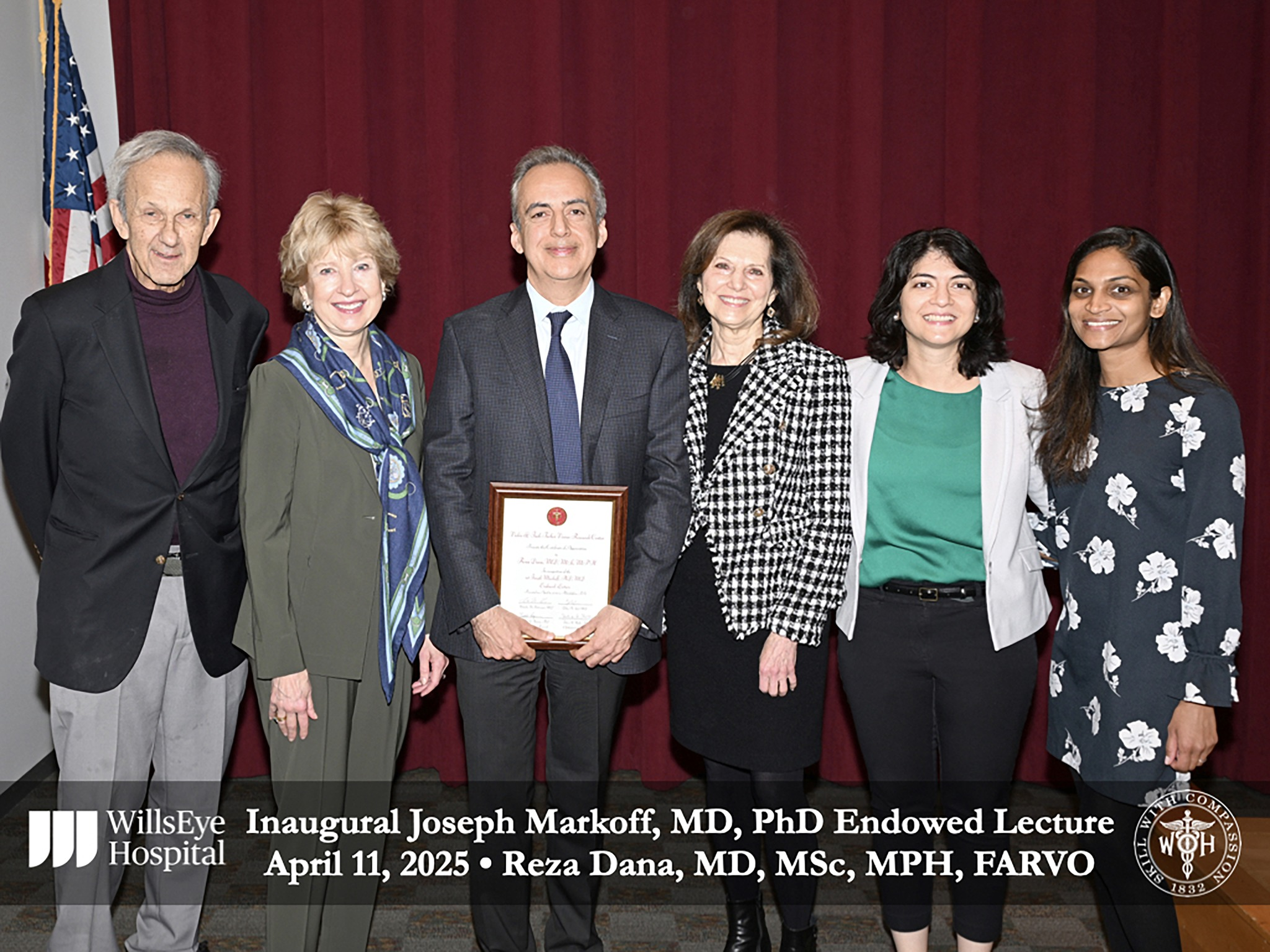
  Dr. Dana presenting the Inaugural Joseph Markoff, PhD, MD Endowed Lecture with the Vickie & Jack Farber Vision Research Center at Wills Eye Hospital, Philadelphia, PA.
- 2016 – Endre A. Balazs Prize, International Society for Eye Research
- 2017 – Plenary Address, 121st Meeting of Japanese Ophthalmological Society
- 2017 – Senior Achievement Award, American Academy of Ophthalmology
- 2017 – Streilein Lecture, 30th Biennial Cornea Conference
- 2018 – Friedenwald Award, Association for Research in Vision and Ophthalmology (ARVO)
- 2018 – Research to Prevent Blindness Stein Innovation Award
- 2019 – Ellis Island Medal of Honor
- 2020 – Power List 2020 – The Ophthalmologist
- 2021 – Snell Memorial Lecture, University of Rochester
- 2021 – Bowman Club-David Easty Lecture, UK
- 2021 – Susruta Lecture, University of Pittsburgh
- 2022 – Plenary Lecture, San Rafaele Biomedical Center, Milan Italy
- 2023 – Award Medal, Quinze-Vingts-University of Paris
- 2024 – Robert B Nussenblatt MD MPH Memorial Lecture, American Uveitis Society
- 2024 – Harvard Ophthalmology Distinguished Research Achievement Award
- 2024 – Robert Eugene Anderson Lectureship, University of Oklahoma Dean McGee Eye Institute
- 2025 – Endre A Balazs Medal for Achievements in Ophthalmology, European Association for Vision and Eye Research
- 2025 – Richard Lindstrom Award, American Society of Cataract & Refractive Surgery
- 2025 – Joseph Markoff PhD MD Endowed Lecturer, Wills Eye Hospital, Philadelphia
- 2025 – Harvard Ophthalmology Lifetime Achievement Award in Mentoring
- 2025 – Thomas H. Pettit Lecture, UCLA Stein and Doheny Eye Institutes Annual Meeting
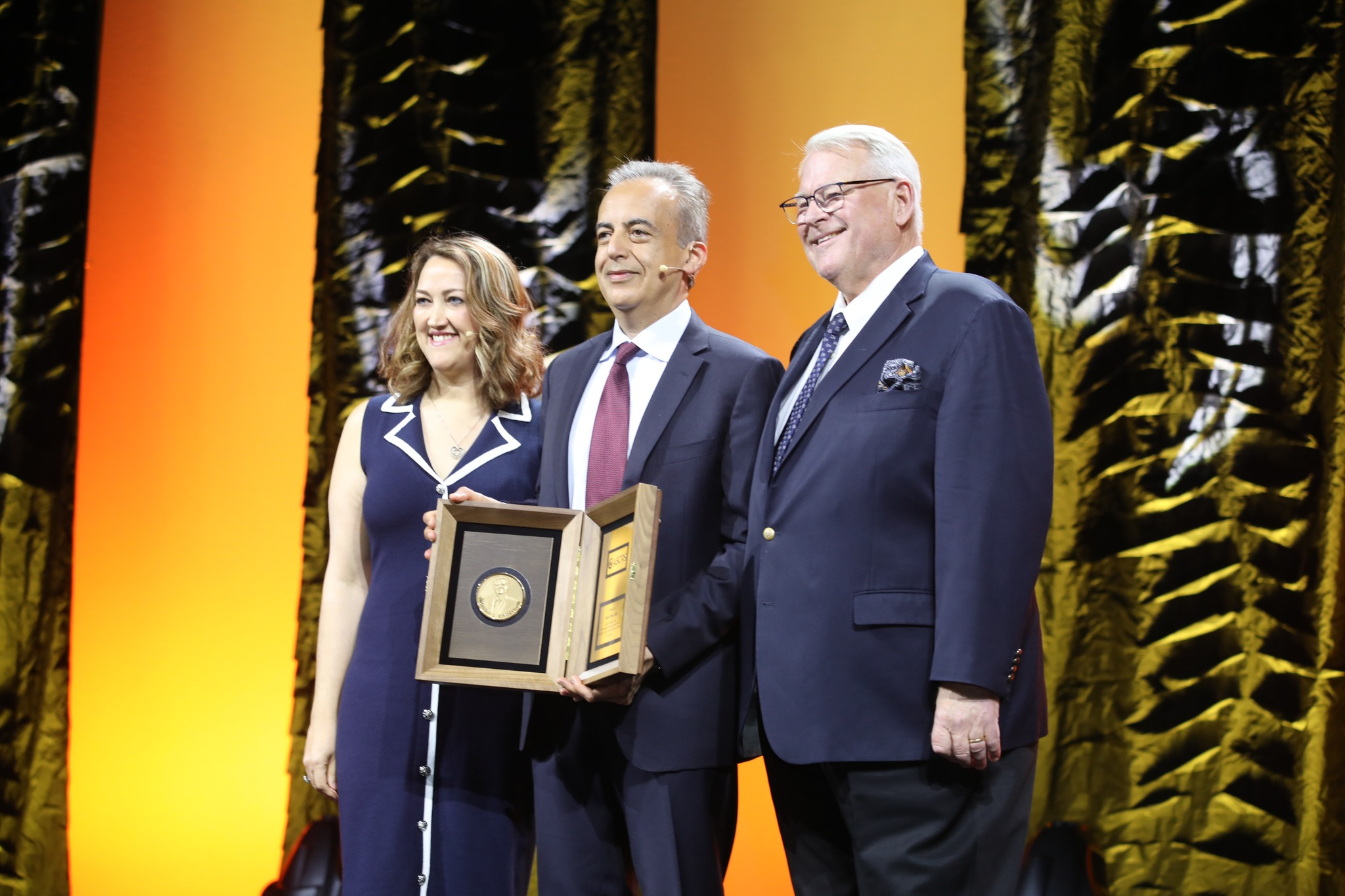
  Dr. Dana receiving the Richard Lindstrom Award 2025 at American Society of Cataract & Refractive Surgery Annual Meeting, Los Angeles, CA.

== Teaching and Mentoring ==
Dana is the Vice Chair for Academic Programs at the Department of Ophthalmology, Massachusetts Eye and Ear and a faculty for the Graduate Program in Immunology, Harvard Medical School. He is the recipient of the Harvard Medical School Clifford Barger Excellence in Mentoring Award, the top mentoring award bestowed at Harvard Medical School. He has mentored over 150 postdoctoral research fellows from 36 countries, 250 clinical fellows and residents, medical students, and graduate students. He has been the director of the National Institutes of Health-funded Harvard-Vision Clinical Scientist Development Program since 2004.
