= Emily Chew =

American ophthalmologist

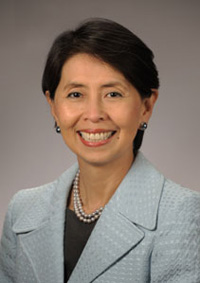
- Education: Johns Hopkins University; University of Nijmegen
- Known for: Deputy director of the Division of Epidemiology and Clinical Applications (DECA), at the National Eye Institute; Chief of the Clinical Trials Branch; Research on Diabetic and age-related eye disease
- Awards: John Gaby Research Day Prize for the best Fellow Research Day paper; Bressler Prize in Vision Science (2014)
- Scientific career
- Fields: Ophthalmology
- Workplaces: National Institutes of Health; National Eye Institute

Emily Ying Chew is an American ophthalmologist and an expert on the human retina with a strong clinical and research interest in diabetic eye disease and age-related eye diseases. She currently works for the National Eye Institute (NEI) at the National Institutes of Health (NIH) in Bethesda, Maryland, where she serves as deputy director of the Division of Epidemiology and Clinical Applications (DECA) and the Institute's deputy clinical director. She designs and implements Phase 1, 2 and 3 clinical trials at the NIH Clinical Center. Chew is board certified in ophthalmology.

== Education ==
Chew obtained her M.D. from the University of Toronto in 1977 and completed her ophthalmology residency there. She began her career as an ophthalmologist while studying under Brenda Gallie, M.D., a retinoblastoma expert at the University of Toronto.

== Career ==
Chew completed her medical retina fellowships at the Wilmer Eye Institute at the Johns Hopkins University in Baltimore, Maryland and the University of Nijmegen in the Netherlands. In 1983, she became board certified in ophthalmology.

From 1983 to 1986, Chew was appointed assistant professor in the Department of Ophthalmology at the University of Toronto. In 1987, she joined the Clinical Trials Branch of the NIH's National Eye Institute. Currently, she directs NEI's medical retina fellowship program.

Chew's work includes data analysis from the Early Treatment Diabetic retinopathy Study (ETDRS) and management and data analysis from the Age-Related Eye Disease Study (AREDS). That study established that daily high doses of certain Antioxidants and Minerals called the AREDS formulation can help slow the progression to advanced AMD. Chew also works on a number of diabetes studies to evaluate Genetic associations with diabetic eye disease. She works on a large clinical trial called the Actions to Control Cardiovascular Risk in Diabetes (ACCORD), designed to test the effects of tight control of blood sugar, blood pressure, and lipid concentration in the blood on diabetic eye disease. She is also study chair for the Age-Related Eye Disease Study 2 (AREDS2), a Phase 3 study that is investigating the use of lutein/zeaxanthin (found in leafy greens such as kale) and/or omega-3 polyunsaturated Fatty acids as treatment for age-related macular degeneration (AMD) and Cataracts, the two leading causes of blindness in the United States of America.

Chew is the author of more than 200 Research Articles based on her studies of retinal disease, including articles published in The Lancet, Nature Medicine, and Science. She also serves on the editorial board of several major journals, including Ophthalmology, Investigative Ophthalmology & Visual Science and Retina.

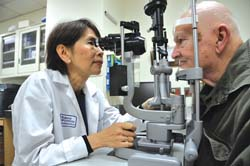
Dr. Emily Chew of the National Eye Institute (NEI) conducts a thorough eye exam on her patient, Charles R. Tansil.

== Honors ==
- Trustee of the Association for Research in Vision and Ophthalmology, Inc. (ARVO).
- Past president of the Macula Society.
- Received the 2014 Bressler Prize in Vision Science.
- In 1979, she was awarded the John Gaby Research Day Prize for the best Fellow Research Day paper, presented by the University of Toronto Department of Ophthalmology and Vision Sciences.
- In 2009, she and fellow NEI scientist Frederick L. Ferris III, M.D. received a $100,000 unrestricted research grant award from the Alcon Research Institute. The Alcon Research Institute supports global advancements in vision science.

== Further information ==
- Video, "Ask a Scientist: Eye-Related Myths," https://www.youtube.com/watch?v=h83zPt2A-aU
- Video, March 31, 2010, "Life Works: Ophthalmologist" https://www.youtube.com/watch?v=FY0riGWAqS8
