= C40H56O2 =

The molecular formula C_{40}H_{56}O_{2} (molar mass: 568.87 g/mol) may refer to:

- Lutein
- Zeaxanthin
- Meso-zeaxanthin (3R,3´S-zeaxanthin)
