= Melinda Duncan =

American biomedical researcher

Melinda K. Duncan is an American biomedical researcher, specializing in lens and eye development. She earned a bachelor's degree from Lafayette College, and completed a doctorate at the University of Medicine and Dentistry of New Jersey, Robert Wood Johnson Medical School, then conducted post doctoral research at the National Eye Institute. Duncan is a professor at the University of Delaware, where in 2024, she was named the Trustees Distinguished Professor of Biology.
