= Acta Ophthalmologica =

- Discipline: Ophthalmology
- Language: English
- Edited by: Kai Kaarniranta Line Kessel

Publication details
- Former name: Acta Ophthalmologica Scandinavica
- History: 1923-present
- Publisher: John Wiley & Sons
- Frequency: 8/year
- Open access: Hybrid
- Impact factor: 3 (2025)

Standard abbreviations
- ISO 4: Acta Ophthalmol.

Indexing
- CODEN: AOOUAQ
- ISSN: 1755-375X (print); 1755-3768 (web)
- OCLC no.: 316184427

Links
- Journal homepage; Online access; Online archive

Acta Ophthalmologica is a peer-reviewed academic, medical journal of ophthalmology established in 1923. The journal is edited by Kai Kaarniranta (University of Eastern Finland) and Line Kessel (University of Copenhagen) and is published 8 times per year by John Wiley & Sons on behalf of the Acta Ophthalmologica Scandinavica Foundation. It is the official journal of the five Nordic Ophthalmological Societies as well as of the European Association for Vision and Eye Research (since 2006) and the Dutch Ophthalmological Society. Supplement issues, as well special issues for doctoral theses, are published along with the main journal.

== History ==
The journal was established in 1923 as Acta Ophthalmologica (ISSN 0001-639X) and published bimonthly. It was renamed in 1995 as Acta Ophthalmologica Scandinavica (print: ISSN 1395-3907, online: ISSN 1600-0420) and returned to its original title in 2008, when the publication frequency was increased to 8 per year.

A supplement to the journal has also been published. From 1932 to 1984 this was entitled Acta Ophthalmologica Supplementum (ISSN 0065-1451) and from 1985 to 1994 Acta Ophthalmologica Supplement (ISSN 0065-1451). From 1995 to 2007, it was published as Acta Ophthalmologica Scandinavica Supplement (ISSN 1395-3931), before returning to Acta Ophthalmologica Supplement (print: ISSN 1755-3776, online: ISSN 1755-375X) in 2008.

== Prizes ==
The Acta Ophthalmologica Award is given biennially in recognition of excellence in ophthalmic research to a scientist from the Nordic countries, selected by the Board of Directors of the Acta Ophthalmologica Scandinavica Foundation. It is handed out at the Nordic Congress of Ophthalmology and was initiated in 2002. The Award involves the right to give the Acta Honorary Lecture, and the recipient receives a gold medal that depicts the two skating owls associated with Acta Ophthalmologica. No award was given in 2020 because the Nordic Congress was postponed to 2022.

- 2002 Professor Niels Ehlers (Denmark)
- 2004 Professor Leila Laatikainen (Finland)
- 2006 Professor Sven Erik G. Nilsson (Sweden)
- 2008 Professor Ahti Tarkkanen (Finland)
- 2010 Professor Anders Heijl (Sweden)
- 2012 Professor Albert Alm (Sweden)
- 2014 Professor Jan Ulrik Prause (Denmark)
- 2016 Professor Einar Stefánsson (Iceland)
- 2018 Professor Toke Bek (Denmark)
- 2022 Professor Tero Kivelä (Finland)
- 2024 Professor Jesper Hjortdal (Denmark)
- 2026 Professor Anders Behndig (Sweden)

The Acta-EVER Award is given annually in recognition of achievements in eye and vision research to a scientist selected alternately by the Board of Directors of the Acta Ophthalmologica Scandinavica Foundation and the Board of the European Association for Vision and Eye Research. It is handed out at the Congress of this Association and was initiated in 2006. The Award involves the right to give the Acta-EVER Honorary Lecture, and the recipient receives a silver medal that depicts professor Conrad Christian Carl Lundsgaard, the founder of Acta Ophthalmologica. No award was given in 2020 and 2021 because the Congress was changed to virtual.

- 2006 Professor Paul Sieving (United States)
- 2007 Professor Morten la Cour (Denmark)
- 2008 Professor Fridbert Jonasson (Iceland)
- 2009 Professor Jost Jonas (Germany)
- 2010 Professor Wolfgang Drexler (Germany)
- 2011 Professor Per Söderberg (Sweden)
- 2012 Professor Anders Heijl (Sweden)
- 2013 Professor Tero Kivelä (Finland)
- 2014 Professor Neville Osborn (United Kingdom)
- 2015 Professor Russell G. Foster (United Kingdom)
- 2016 Professor John Greenwood (United Kingdom)
- 2017 Professor Leopold Schmetterer (Austria)
- 2018 Professor Gisèle Soubrane (France)
- 2019 Professor Martine J. Jager (The Netherlands)
- 2022 Professor Einar Stefánsson (Iceland)
- 2023 Professor Hannu Uusitalo (Finland)
- 2024 Professor John Babrbu (United Kingdom)
- 2025 Professor Steffen Heegaard (Denmark)
- 2026 Professor Claus Cursiefen (Germany)

== Abstracting and indexing ==
The journal is indexed and abstracted in the following databases:

- Abstracts in Anthropology
- Academic Search
- Biological Abstracts
- BIOSIS Previews
- Chemical Abstracts Service
- CSA Biological Sciences Database
- Current Contents/Clinical Medicine
- EMBASE
- Index Medicus/MEDLINE/PubMed
- Index Veterinarius
- MEDLINE
- ProQuest databases
- Science Citation Index

According to the Journal Citation Reports, the journal has a 2025 impact factor of 3.00, ranking it 13th out of 62 journals in the category "Ophthalmology".
