= Michael F. Chiang =

American pediatric ophthalmologist

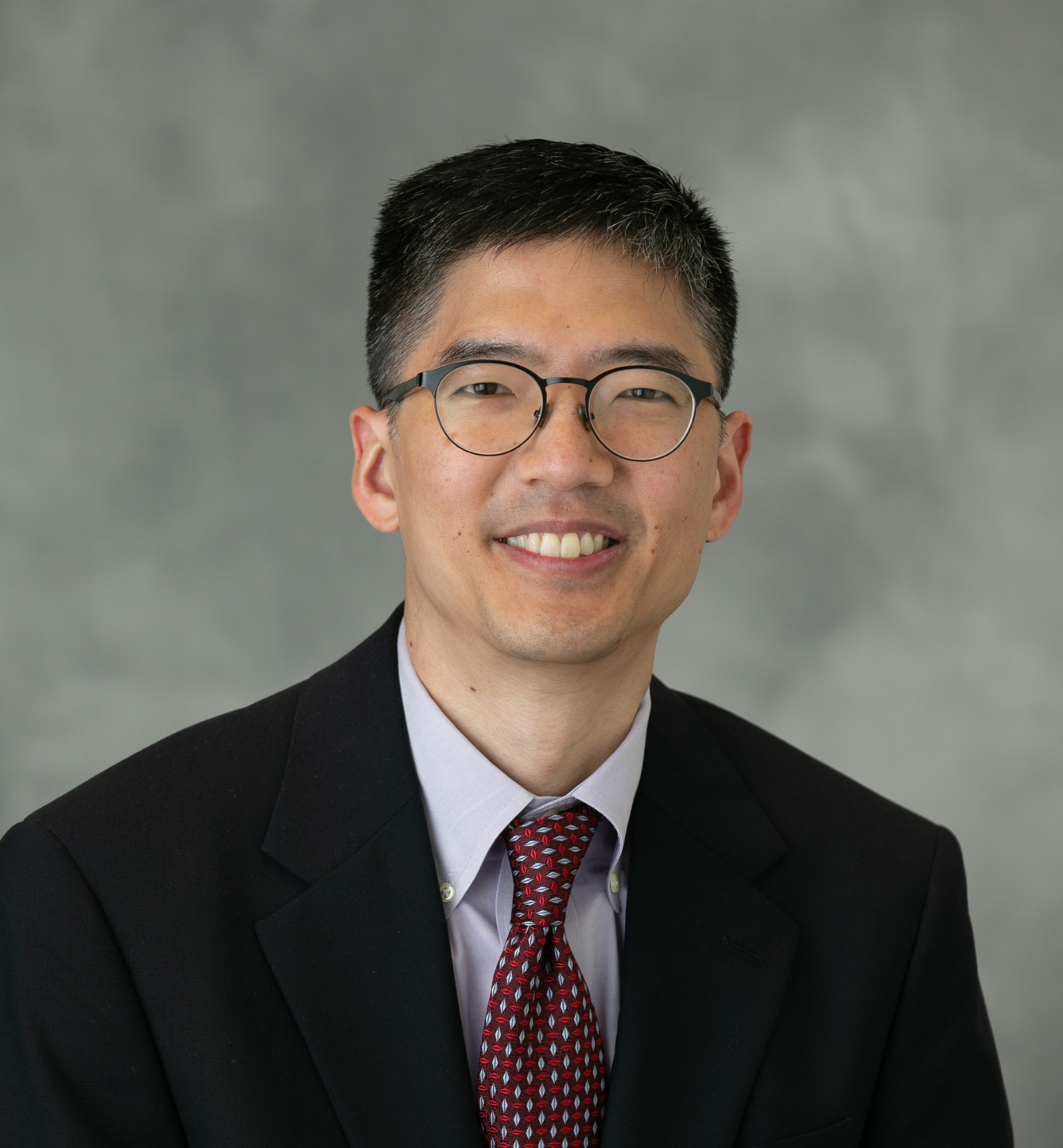
- Chiang in 2020
- Education: Stanford University (BS); Harvard University (MD); Columbia University (MA)
- Scientific career
- Fields: Pediatric ophthalmology
- Institutions: Columbia University; Oregon Health & Science University; National Eye Institute

Michael F. Chiang is an American pediatric ophthalmologist serving as the director of the National Eye Institute. His research focuses on the interface of biomedical informatics and clinical ophthalmology in areas such as retinopathy of prematurity (ROP), telehealth, artificial intelligence, electronic health records, data science, and genotype-phenotype correlation.

== Life ==
Chiang received a B.S. in Electrical Engineering and Biology from Stanford University, an M.D. from Harvard Medical School and the Harvard–MIT Program in Health Sciences and Technology, and an M.A. in Biomedical Informatics from Columbia University. He completed residency and pediatric ophthalmology fellowship training at the Wilmer Eye Institute.

Between 2001-2010, he worked at Columbia University, where he was Anne S. Cohen Associate Professor of Ophthalmology & Biomedical Informatics, director of medical student education in ophthalmology, and director of the introductory graduate student course in biomedical informatics. From 2010-2020, he worked at Oregon Health & Science University (OHSU), where he was Knowles Professor of Ophthalmology & Medical Informatics and Clinical Epidemiology, and Associate Director of the Casey Eye Institute. He co-directed a National Institutes of Health (NIH) funded T32 training program in visual science for graduate students and research fellows, as well as an NIH-funded K12 clinician-scientist program at OHSU.

Chiang began at the NIH in November 2020 as director of the National Eye Institute. His research focuses on the interface of biomedical informatics and clinical ophthalmology in areas such as retinopathy of prematurity (ROP), telehealth, artificial intelligence, electronic health records, data science, and genotype-phenotype correlation.

Chiang was elected to the National Academy of Medicine in 2023.
