= Meso-Zeaxanthin =

Meso-zeaxanthin
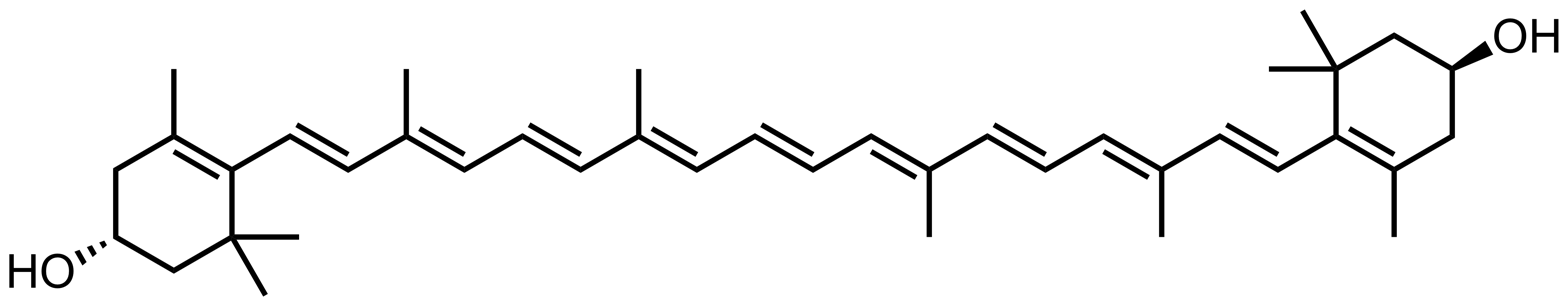

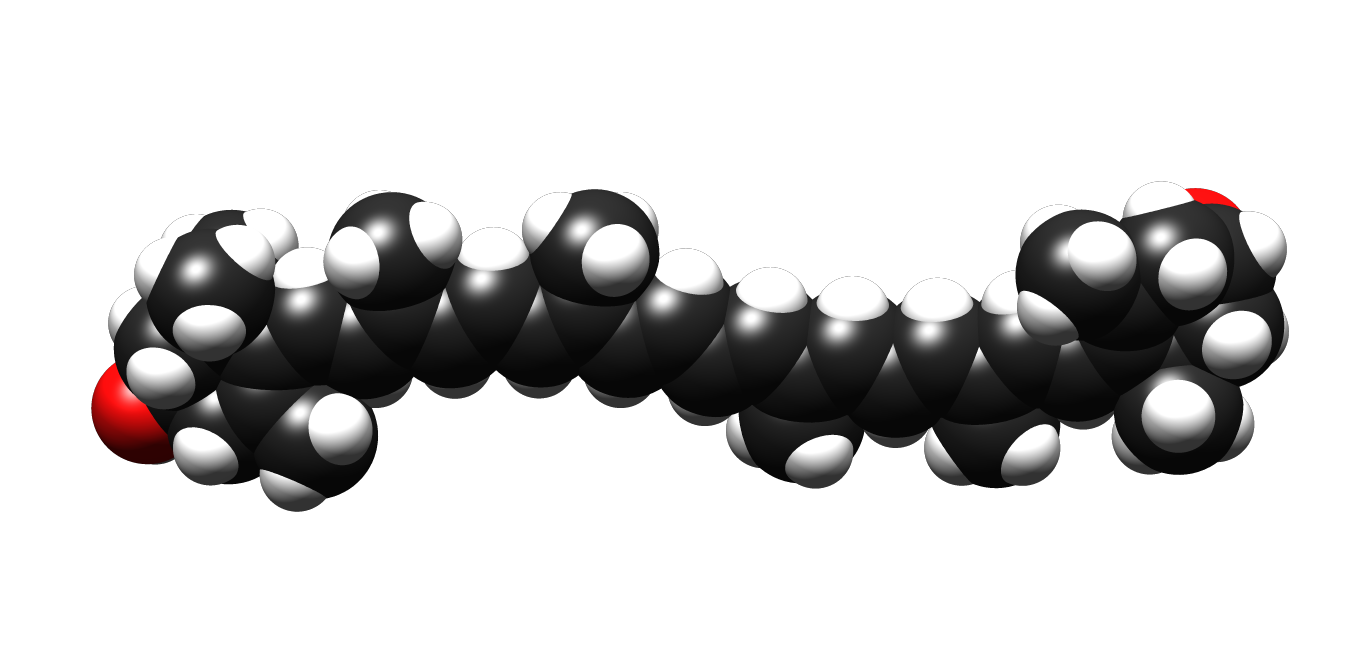

Names
- IUPAC name (3R,3′S)-β,β-Carotene-3,3′-diol
- Systematic IUPAC name (1R)-4-{(1E,3E,5E,7E,9E,11E,13E,15E,17E)-18-[(4S)-4-Hydroxy-2,6,6-trimethylcyclohex-1-en-1-yl]-3,7,12,16-tetramethyloctadeca-1,3,5,7,9,11,13,15,17-nonaen-1-yl}-3,5,5-trimethylcyclohex-3-en-1-ol
- Other names 3R,3′S-zeaxanthin

Identifiers
CAS Number	31272-50-1
3D model (JSmol)	Interactive image
ChEBI	CHEBI:138919
ChemSpider	4946722
PubChem CID	6442658
UNII	3O63K300I5
- InChI: InChI=1S/C40H56O2/c1-29(17-13-19-31(3)21-23-37-33(5)25-35(41)27-39(37,7)8)15-11-12-16-30(2)18-14-20-32(4)22-24-38-34(6)26-36(42)28-40(38,9)10/h11-24,35-36,41-42H,25-28H2,1-10H3/b12-11+,17-13+,18-14+,23-21+,24-22+,29-15+,30-16+,31-19+,32-20+/t35-,36+ Key: JKQXZKUSFCKOGQ-YOPUJPICSA-N
- SMILES: CC1=C(C(C[C@@H](C1)O)(C)C)/C=C/C(=C/C=C/C(=C/C=C/C=C(/C=C/C=C(/C=C/C2=C(C[C@@H](CC2(C)C)O)C)\C)\C)/C)/C

Properties
Chemical formula	C_{40}H_{56}O_{2}
Molar mass	568.87144 g/mol
Appearance	orange-red
Solubility in water	insoluble
- Except where otherwise noted, data are given for materials in their standard state (at 25 °C [77 °F], 100 kPa). Infobox references

Meso-zeaxanthin (3R,3′S-zeaxanthin) is a xanthophyll carotenoid, and is one of the three stereoisomers of zeaxanthin. The meso- form is the second most abundant in nature, after 3R,3′R-zeaxanthin, which is produced by plants and algae. Meso-zeaxanthin has been identified in specific tissues of marine organisms and in the macula lutea, also known as the "yellow spot" of the human retina.

== Occurrence ==
Carotenoids are essential for animal health and functioning, but animals cannot produce them. Animals obtain carotenoids from their diet, with herbivores sourcing them from plants or algae, and carnivores, in turn, sourcing them from herbivores.

Meso-zeaxanthin is not present in plants, except for marine species. Originally, it was suggested that meso-zeaxanthin present in humans and other vertebrates was non-dietary in origin, instead being biosynthesized in the macula (the central part of the retina) from retinal lutein (another xanthophyll carotenoid found in the human diet); this work has since been refuted.

Consistent with work by Maoka et al. in 1986, Nolan et al. showed that meso-zeaxanthin is present in the skin of trout, sardine and salmon, and in the flesh of trout. In a subsequent publication, Nolan's group detected and quantified the three stereoisomers of zeaxanthin, including meso-zeaxanthin, in the flesh of two different trout species, which was the first report of concentrations of meso-zeaxanthin in habitually consumed food. Prior to this research, a publication from Khachick et al. (2002) reported that liver from Japanese quail (Coturnix japonica) and frog plasma contain meso-zeaxanthin.

Meso-zeaxanthin may be generated from other carotenoids consumed by animals, as carotenoids can be interconverted for functional reasons. For example, it has been suggested that meso-zeaxanthin of trout integuments is derived from astaxanthin, and meso-zeaxanthin in primates is derived at least in part from lutein.

A few commercially available food supplements include meso-zeaxanthin in their formulations, supposedly to support macular health. A 2016 study comparing the carotenoid concentrations of commercially available food supplements on their label found that, while only two declared their inclusion of meso-zeaxanthin, it was present in several others as well. The authors concluded that the presence of meso-zeaxanthin in the other formulations was likely due to it being less expensive than zeaxanthin, and it is hard to distinguish from one from the other via chemical analysis.

== In the macula ==
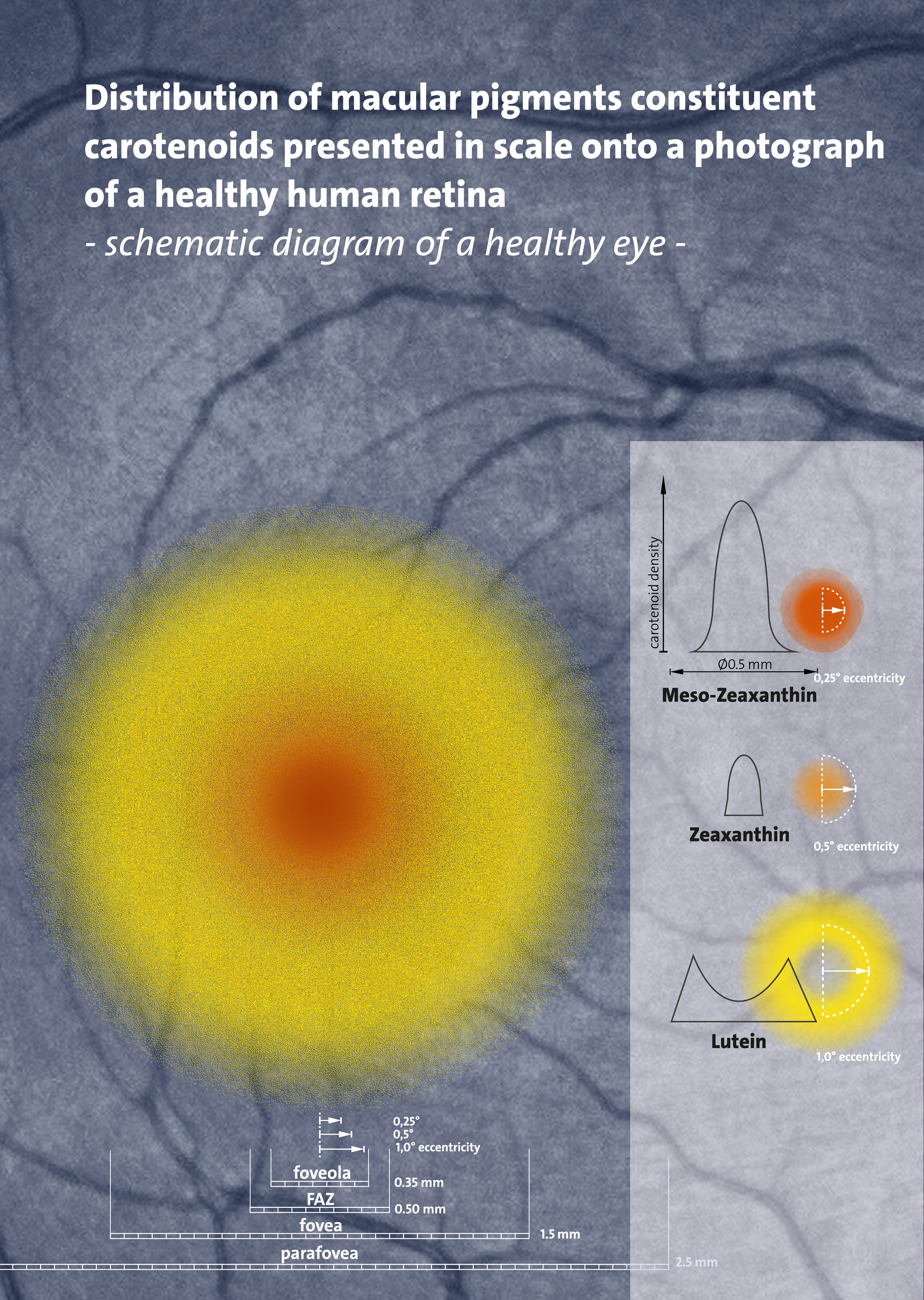
Distribution of macular pigment constituent carotenoids presented in scale onto a photograph of a healthy human retina

Meso-zeaxanthin, lutein, and 3R,3′R-zeaxanthin are the main carotenoids in the macula lutea, found in a ratio of 1:1:1, and are collectively referred to as macular pigment (MP). Meso-zeaxanthin is concentrated at the epicentre of the macula, where it accounts for around 50% of MP at this location, with lutein dominating the peripheral macula.

== Uses ==
=== As an antioxidant and short-wavelength light filter ===
Of the three macular carotenoids (lutein, zeaxanthin and meso-zeaxanthin), meso-zeaxanthin is the most powerful antioxidant, but a combination of the macular carotenoids has been shown to exhibit the greatest antioxidant potential when compared to the individual carotenoids at the same total concentration. This may explain why the human macula uniquely contains these three carotenoids out of about 700 carotenoids present in nature. Also, it has been shown that the combination of the carotenoids results in optimal light filtration (i.e., filtration of short-wavelength blue light) at the macula. This is important because short-wavelength light incident at the macula causes chromatic aberration and light scattering, phenomena that adversely affect visual function and result in poor contrast sensitivity.

=== Use in supplements aimed at eye health ===
In 2013, the Age-Related Eye Disease Study 2 (AREDS2) reported a reduced risk of visual loss and a reduced risk of disease progression over 5 years in 4,200 participants with early or moderate age-related macular degeneration (AMD) who were supplemented with a formulation containing the macular carotenoids and co-antioxidants. The AREDS2 preparation contained only two of the macular pigment’s three carotenoids (lutein and 3R,3´R-zeaxanthin), and did not include meso-zeaxanthin, which is the dominant carotenoid at the centre of the macula, the presence of which is essential for maximum collective antioxidant effect.

Studies have shown that the addition of meso-zeaxanthin to formulations used to increase MP and enhance visual function in diseased and healthy retinas has proven effective. Trials have shown that a formulation containing all three macular carotenoids in a meso-zeaxanthin:lutein:zeaxanthin (mg) ratio of 10:10:2 is superior to alternative formulations, in terms of visual improvements and in observed increases in MP.

=== Use in poultry industries ===
Broiler chickens are yellow when they are fed with carotenoid-containing feed, as these carotenoids accumulate in the skin and subcutaneous fat of the animal. Carotenoid deposition is also the cause of the yellow colour of egg yolk. For this reason, poultry producers add carotenoids (typically lutein, zeaxanthin, canthaxanthin, and β-apo-8´-apocarotenal) to the feed to increase the attractiveness of the final product for the consumer, but also to support animal health. It is believed that lutein and zeaxanthin act synergistically to increase the yellow hue, whereas zeaxanthin is more powerful than lutein due to its larger chromophore. Therefore, several companies use marigold extract where a percentage of lutein has been converted into meso-zeaxanthin in order to supplement broilers and hens with both carotenoids. The isomer of zeaxanthin obtained from lutein is meso-zeaxanthin due to the nature of the technique used (see below).

== Production ==
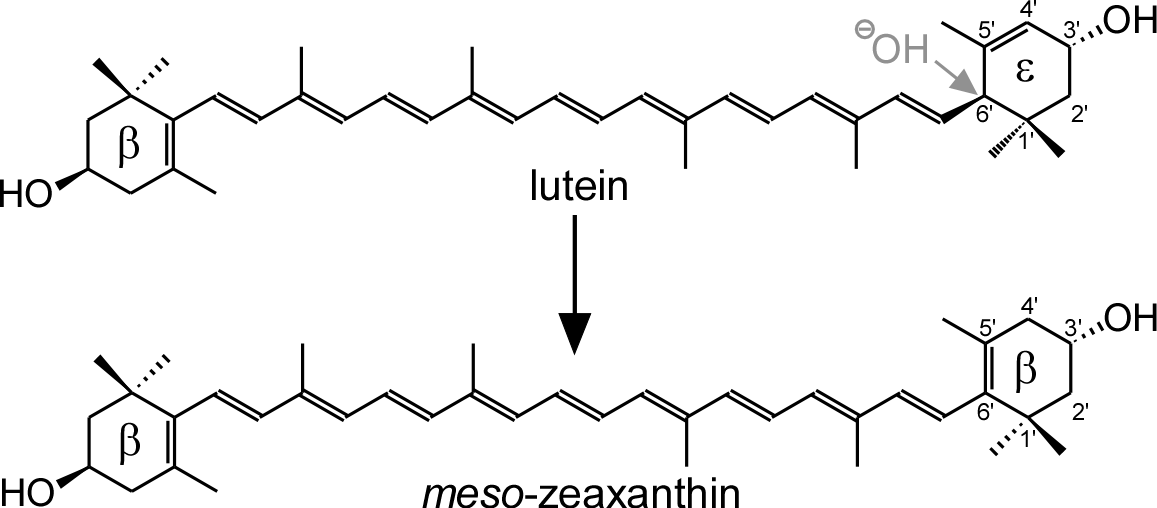
Conversion of lutein to meso-zeaxanthin

Meso-zeaxanthin is produced at an industrial level from the lutein obtained from marigold petals. The process involves saponification, which is carried out using high temperature and a high concentration of base, leads to the isomerization of the 4′-5′ double bond to the 5′-6′ position. This converts the ɛ-ring of lutein into a β-ring, thus converting lutein into meso-zeaxanthin. The stereochemistry of this zeaxanthin is determined by the position of the hydroxyl group at the 3´ position, which results in the "S" designation for the final zeaxanthin molecule. The stereoisomer produced by this process is 3R,3′S-zeaxanthin (i.e., meso-zeaxanthin). The conditions of saponification can be modulated to increase or decrease the conversion rate of lutein into meso-zeaxanthin.

== Animal studies ==
Meso-zeaxanthin has been tested for animal toxicity by several research teams, who report a lack of toxicity. The NOAEL ('No Observed-Adverse-Effect Level') of meso-zeaxanthin is far greater than doses used in dietary supplements. In 2016, the GRAS ('Generally Regarded As Safe') status of meso-zeaxanthin was acknowledged by the FDA.

== Human studies ==
Meso-zeaxanthin is a regular dietary component in countries where it is a major pigment used by the poultry industry, particularly in Mexico. Neither adverse nor positive effects have yet been reported. In addition, meso-zeaxanthin has been tested for efficacy, though not for safety, in small pilot studies in humans.

The first study to evaluate the effects of a dietary supplement containing predominantly meso-zeaxanthin was conducted in 2007. This research confirmed that meso-zeaxanthin was effectively absorbed into the serum, and MP density was increased significantly in the supplementation group. No such increases were observed in the placebo group.

In another study 19 subjects consumed a supplement composed of all three macular carotenoids, including meso-zeaxanthin, for 22 days. Results demonstrated that meso-zeaxanthin was absorbed. At the Institute of Vision Research, Waterford Institute of Technology, the Meso-zeaxanthin Ocular Supplementation Trials (MOST), have been conducted to evaluate safety, MP response, and serum carotenoid response in subjects with and without AMD, following consumption of a supplement containing all three macular carotenoids in which meso-zeaxanthin was predominant. These studies confirmed safety for human consumption of the macular carotenoids following many biological tests to assess renal and liver functions, lipid profile, hematologic profile, and markers of inflammation.

Also, the MOST trials identified statistically significant increases in serum concentrations of meso-zeaxanthin and lutein from baseline. Significant increases in central MP levels were also observed after just two weeks of supplementation. Furthermore, in patients who had an atypical MP distribution in the eye (i.e., they did not have a high concentration of pigment in the centre of the macula), when supplemented with a meso-zeaxanthin-dominant supplement for 8 weeks, the normal pigment profile was reinstated, whereas this was not the case when patients were supplemented with a formulation lacking meso-zeaxanthin.

The main findings from the MOST trials in patients with AMD were published in 2013 and 2015. The series of publications from these trials concluded, "Augmentation of the MP optical density across its spatial profile and enhancements in contrast sensitivity were best achieved after supplementation with a formulation containing high doses of meso-zeaxanthin in combination with lutein and zeaxanthin". Also, the final publication from this work, published in 2015, concluded that, "The inclusion of meso-zeaxanthin in a supplement formulation seems to confer benefits in terms of MP augmentation and in terms of enhanced contrast sensitivity in subjects with early AMD.".

In 2016 and 2017, the results of two small clinical trials were published. The first trial, the CREST (Central Retinal Enrichment Supplementation Trials) study involved 105 normal healthy volunteers who underwent a series of complex tests of vision and were supplemented over 12 months. Of these volunteers, 53 received daily active supplements containing meso-zeaxanthin, lutein, and zeaxanthin, while 52 subjects received a placebo (the control group). The outcome demonstrated that those receiving all three macular carotenoids had improved contrast sensitivity.

The second trial, CREST AMD, was a two-year trial involving 96 subjects diagnosed with the early stages of AMD. All subjects received the AREDS2-recommended formula, with or without added meso-zeaxanthin, and all showed a significant improvement in the primary outcome measure of contrast sensitivity when reading an eye-chart. There was no difference between the results for subjects whose supplements included meso-zeaxanthin versus those who did not; thus, meso-zeaxanthin did not improve the eye health of the subjects who took it. There were no significant differences in how the subjects' AMD progressed, between the meso-zeaxanthin group and the AREDS2 group.

== See also ==
- Stereoisomerism
