= Andreas Clemens =

German physician and pharmaceutical executive

Andreas Clemens MD, PhD (Dr. med. habil)
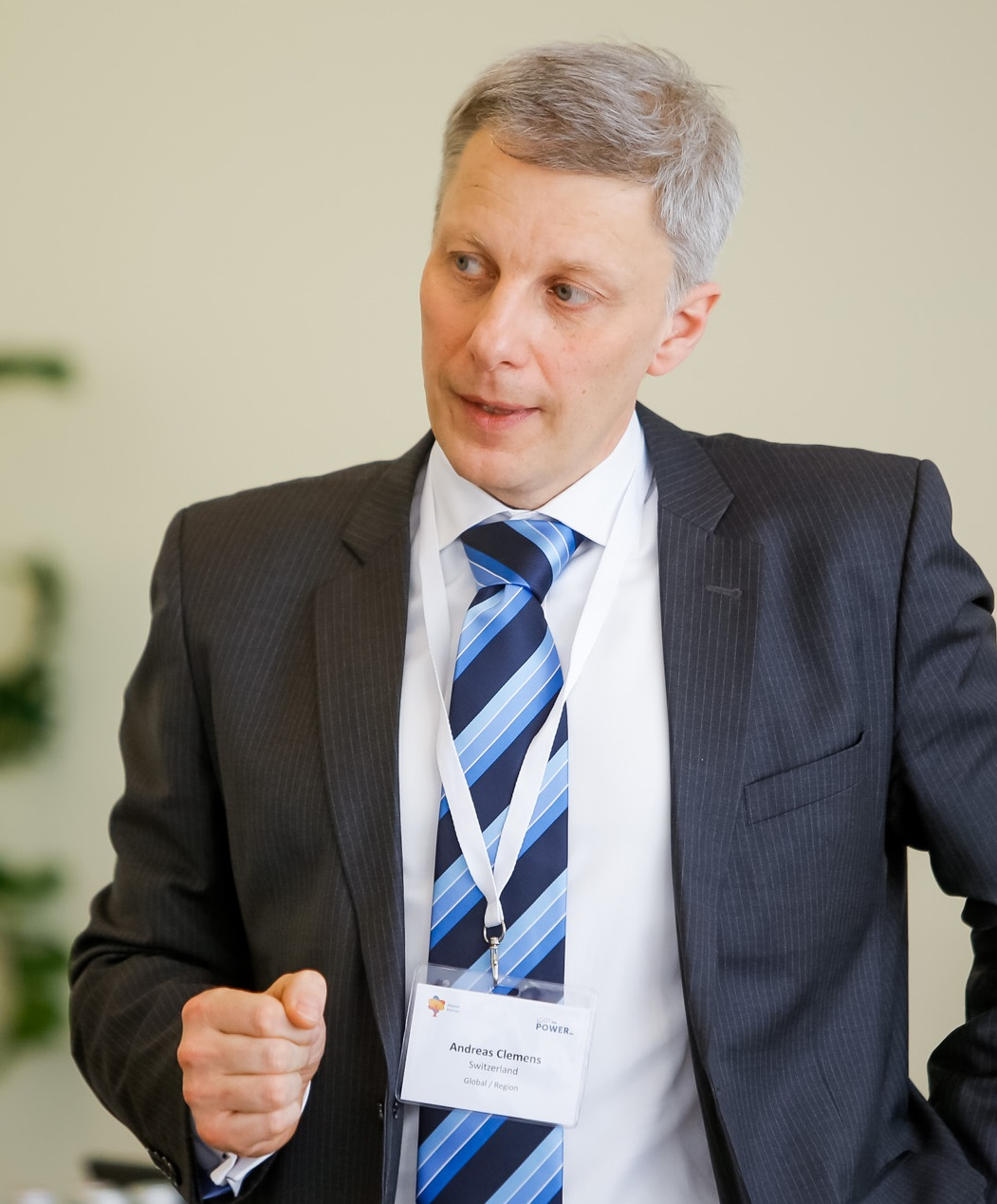
- Born: 6 May 1966 (age 60); Hildesheim, Lower Saxony, Germany
- Education: Georg-August University of Göttingen; Kiel University; Heidelberg University; Johannes Gutenberg University Mainz; University of Freiburg
- Occupations: Physician, pharmaceutical executive
- Known for: Drug development and medical affairs in immunology, cardiology, endocrinology, ophthalmology, and rare diseases
- Medical career
- Profession: Physician
- Field: Internal medicine, Endocrinology, Diabetology
- Institutions: Novartis; Boehringer Ingelheim; Pfizer
- Website: andreas-clemens.com

Andreas Clemens (born 6 May 1966) is a German physician and pharmaceutical executive. He is a specialist in internal medicine, endocrinology, and diabetology and has held senior leadership positions in medical development and medical affairs within the global pharmaceutical industry. He currently serves as Executive Director and Global Head of Medical Affairs, Immunology at Novartis.

== Early life and education ==
Clemens was born in Hildesheim, Lower Saxony. He studied medicine at the Georg-August University of Göttingen and received his MD in 1994. He subsequently completed postgraduate training in internal medicine, endocrinology, and diabetology at university hospitals in Kiel and Heidelberg. In 2016 he earned the German post-doctoral qualification Dr. med. habil. in internal medicine with a focus on cardiology at the Johannes Gutenberg University Mainz, which entitled him to teach as a Privatdozent.

== Career ==
Clemens began his career in academic clinical medicine, working at University Hospital Kiel and University Hospital Heidelberg. He later served at Klinikum Ludwigshafen, where he helped establish structured diabetes education and patient care programs.

In 2001 he joined Pfizer as a Medical Advisor in cardiology, endocrinology, and diabetes, contributing to medical strategy for several metabolic and cardiovascular therapies. He later moved to Boehringer Ingelheim, where he was involved in the global medical development and launch of the oral anticoagulant dabigatran etexilate (Pradaxa).

Clemens joined Novartis in 2014. His roles have included Medical Franchise Head for cardiometabolic diseases, Executive Medical Director for ophthalmology in Europe, Vice President and Head of the New Brand Medical Incubator and Rare Disease Unit for Europe (2021–2023), Global Head of Medical Affairs Strategy for Autoinflammatory Diseases and Ocular Gene Therapy (2023–2024), and Executive Director and Global Head of Medical Affairs, Immunology (2024–present).

== Research and publications ==
Clemens has authored or co-authored more than 130 peer-reviewed scientific publications, including over 80 original research articles, with a reported cumulative impact factor exceeding 337. According to Google Scholar, his h-index is 48.

His research has focused on pharmaceutical drug development in thrombosis, cardiology, endocrinology, ophthalmology, and rare diseases, including early contributions to the clinical development of dabigatran etexilate.

He serves as an associate editor of the journal Contemporary Clinical Trials.

== Other activities ==
Clemens is a member of the foundation board of the European Association for Vision and Eye Research (EVERf).

He is also active in academic teaching and has lectured at the University of Freiburg and the Johannes Gutenberg University Mainz.
