= Paul A. Sieving =

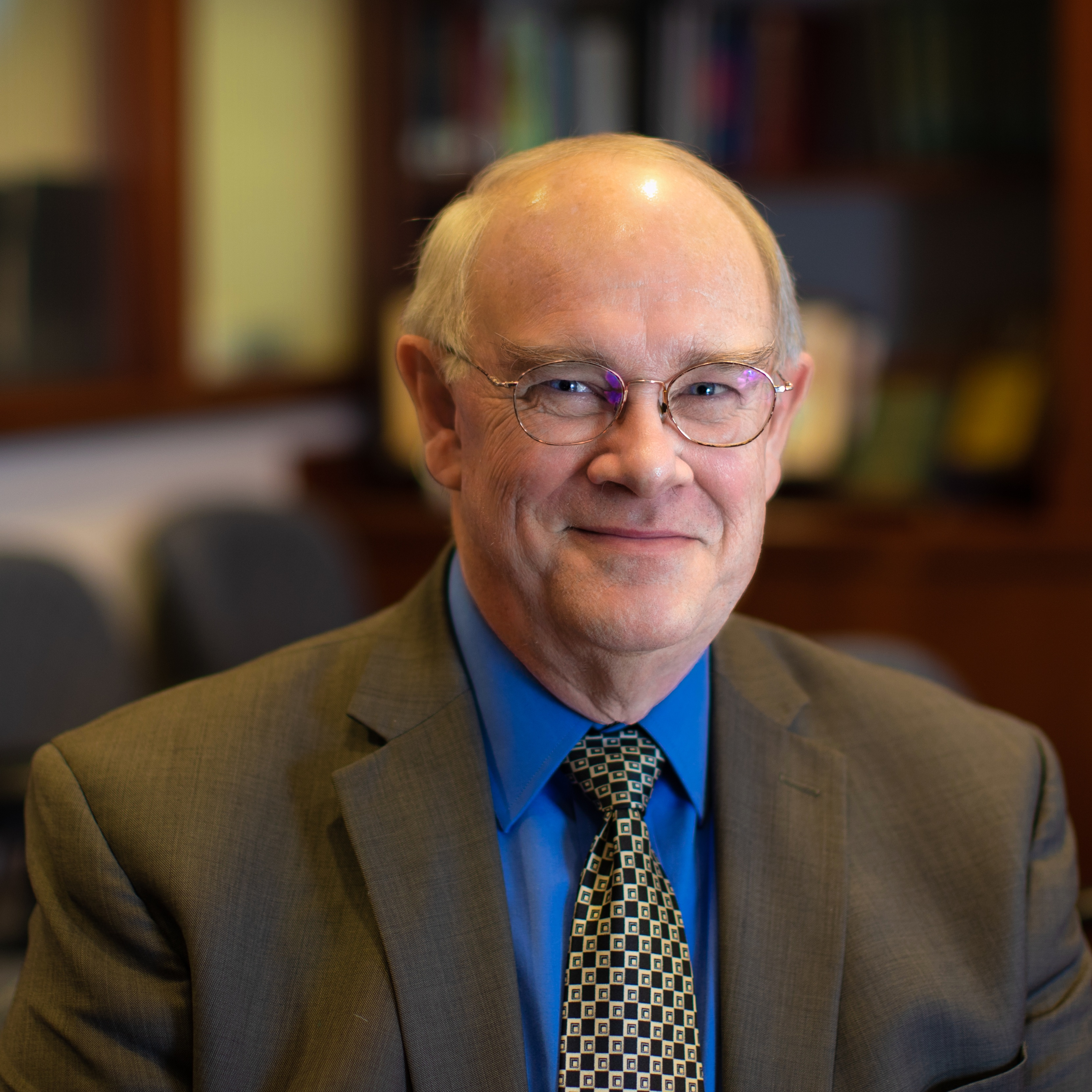
Paul A. Sieving

Paul A. Sieving is a former director of the National Eye Institute, part of the U.S. National Institutes of Health. Prior to joining the NIH in 2001, he served on the faculty of the University of Michigan Medical School as the Paul R. Lichter Professor of Ophthalmic Genetics. He also was the founding director of the Center for Retinal and Macular Degeneration in the university's Department of Ophthalmology and Visual Sciences.

Sieving is recognized for translational medicine studies of human progressive, blinding, inherited retinal and macular neurodegeneration diseases, including retinitis pigmentosa and Stargardt disease. His laboratory studies the conditions in transgenic animal models in pursuit of pharmacological approaches to slowing degeneration in people with the disorders. His group conducted the first human clinical trial of ciliary neurotrophic factor (CNTF) as a rescue factor for retinitis pigmentosa.

His lab studies potential treatments for a juvenile form of macular degeneration termed X-linked retinoschisis (XLRS). The lab developed a mouse model of XLRS and successfully treated the condition by gene therapy in mouse and rabbit models. Sieving's team, in coordination with the clinical staff at the National Institutes of Health Clinical Center, is conducting a phase 1 clinical trial to test the therapy in XLRS patients. He maintains a small clinical practice at NEI for patients with these and other genetic retinal diseases, including Stargardt juvenile macular degeneration.

Sieving established the NEI Audacious Goals Initiative (AGI) for Regenerative Medicine, a major program to develop treatments for eye diseases. The AGI is a strategic research effort to restore function of critical nerve cells in the eye and visual system even after they are damaged by disease. Success will mean new approaches to prevent and even reverse vision loss in diseases such as age-related macular degeneration and glaucoma.

== Education ==
As an undergraduate student at Valparaiso University, Sieving majored in history and physics. He then studied nuclear physics at Yale Graduate School in 1970-73 under D. Allan Bromley, and attended Yale Law School from 1973 - 1974. He received his medical degree from the University of Illinois College of Medicine in 1978 and a Ph.D. in bioengineering from the University of Illinois Graduate College in 1981. Sieving completed an ophthalmology residency at the University of Illinois Eye and Ear Infirmary in Chicago. He performed post-doctoral studies of retinal electrophysiology with Roy H. Steinberg at the University of California, San Francisco, in 1982–84. He then did a clinical fellowship in genetic retinal degenerations with Eliot Berson in 1984–85 at Harvard Medical School, Massachusetts Eye and Ear Infirmary.

== Awards and honors ==
Sieving has been named among the “Best Doctors in America” for many years and was honored with the Research to Prevent Blindness Senior Scientific Investigator Award in 1998, the Alcon Research Institute Award in 2000, the Pisart Award in Vision Science from the Lighthouse Guild in 2005, and the Società Oftalmologica Italiana Honorary Award in Ophthalmology in 2016. He serves as a jury member for the António Champalimaud Vision Award of the €1 million presented yearly in Lisbon, Portugal. He is an elected member of many organizations, including the American Ophthalmological Society (1993), the Academia Ophthalmologica Internationalis (2005), the Institute of Medicine, National Academy of Sciences (2006), and the German National Academy of Sciences (2014).
