= Age-related eye disease study =

Clinical trial

The age-related eye disease study (AREDS) was a clinical trial sponsored by the National Eye Institute that ran from 1992 to 2001. The study was designed to:

- investigate the natural history and risk factors of age-related macular degeneration (AMD) and cataracts, and
- evaluate the effects of high doses of antioxidants and zinc on the progression of the two conditions in those with AMD.

The results were reported in the October 2001 issue of Archives of Ophthalmology. The study followed 3,640 individuals for an average of 6.3 years between 1992 and 2001. The researchers concluded that high levels of antioxidants and zinc can reduce some people's risk of developing advanced AMD by about 25 percent. Advanced AMD is defined as either choroidal neovascularization (wet macular degeneration) or atrophic age-related macular degeneration (geographic atrophy). The anti-oxidants and zinc supplements only reduced the risk of progression to wet macular degeneration. Those that benefited from the dietary supplements included those with intermediate-stage AMD and those with advanced AMD in one eye only. The supplements had no significant effect on the development or progression of cataracts. "High levels" in this case were defined to be:

- 500 milligrams of vitamin C;
- 400 international units of vitamin E;
- 15 milligrams of beta-carotene (or 25,000 international units of vitamin A);
- 80 milligrams of the dietary mineral zinc, in the form of zinc oxide; and
- two milligrams of copper as cupric oxide, added to prevent copper deficiency anemia, a condition associated with high levels of zinc intake.

Bausch & Lomb was a collaborator in the study. They and other suppliers provide supplements pre-packaged with formulations based on this study.

Studies in 2016 and 2018 later showed that this average 25 percent reduction in risk from the combination of anti-oxidants and zinc varies by genotype.

== AREDS2 ==
Changes in the formulation
Ingredient	AREDS	AREDS2
Vitamin C	500mg	500mg
Vitamin E	400IU	400IU
Beta-carotene	15mg	Removed
Cupric oxide	2mg	2mg
Lutein		10mg
Zeaxanthin		2mg
Zinc	80mg	80mg

The original AREDS study was followed by AREDS2, a five-year study that started in 2006 to test whether the original AREDS formulation would be improved by adding omega-3 fatty acids; adding lutein and zeaxanthin; removing beta-carotene; or reducing zinc. In AREDS2, participants took one of four AREDS formulations: the original AREDS formulation, AREDS formulation with no beta-carotene, AREDS with low zinc, AREDS with no beta-carotene and low zinc. In addition, they took one of four additional supplement or combinations including lutein and zeaxanthin (10 mg and 2 mg), omega-3 fatty acids (1,000 mg), lutein/zeaxanthin and omega-3 fatty acids, or placebo.

The study reported that there was no overall additional benefit from adding omega-3 fatty acids or lutein and zeaxanthin to the formulation. However, the study did find benefits in two subgroups of participants: those not given beta-carotene, and those who had very little lutein and zeaxanthin in their diets. Removing beta-carotene did not curb the formulation's protective effect against developing advanced AMD, which is important given that high doses of beta-carotene have been linked to higher risk of lung cancers in smokers. According to Dr. Emily Chew, "Because carotenoids can compete with each other for absorption in the body, beta-carotene may have masked the effect of the lutein and zeaxanthin in the overall analysis."

The AREDS2 trial did not find a difference in the effects of 80mg versus 25mg zinc. The UK National Health Service suggests that people may take the lower dose if the higher dose upsets their stomach. The 25mg zinc level has not been compared to a placebo, as of 2020, and 80mg remains the standard.

== Packaging ==
The AREDS2 formulation is often sold with all the ingredients packaged together in one pill, for convenience. These formulations may be labelled as "AREDS2", the pharmaceutical generic name, or they may be labelled with trademarked brand names, or they may be labelled with both. Some preparations not explicitly labelled as AREDS2 may not contain the correct ingredients in the correct quantities, and may contain additional, non-AREDS2 ingredients, which have no proven benefit.

The AREDS2 formulation can also be taken as a set of pills which contain the individual components in the correct quantities.
