= Research to Prevent Blindness =

Non-profit organization

Research to Prevent Blindness (RPB) is a nonprofit organization created in 1960 by Jules Stein, the founder of Music Corporation of America, to stimulate research to eliminate blinding diseases. It supports eye research directed at the prevention, treatment or eradication of all diseases that threaten vision.

In pursuit of this objective, RPB has committed hundreds of millions of dollars in grants to support high-impact vision research. RPB's grant-making programs provide major eye research funding to leading scientific institutions in the U.S. and support the work of hundreds of talented vision scientists engaged in a diverse range of disease-oriented research.

RPB's far-reaching activities are planned and carried out with the expert advice and guidance of a Scientific Advisory Panel composed of distinguished leaders in the field of medical science.

== Mission statement ==
RPB's mission is to preserve and restore vision by supporting research to develop treatments, preventives and cures for all conditions that damage and destroy sight.

== Eye diseases researched ==
Eye diseases addressed by grants from RPB include macular degeneration, cataracts, glaucoma, diabetic retinopathy, dry eye, corneal diseases, uveitis, low vision, amblyopia and strabismus, retinitis pigmentosa, color blindness and ocular cancers.

== History ==
Shortly after it was founded, RPB conducted the first comprehensive survey of the state of eye research in the United States. Among the findings was strong support within the eye research community for a separate National Eye Institute as part of the National Institutes of Health. RPB then led the movement that caused Congress in 1968 to establish the National Eye Institute. In the following years, RPB became a major influence in stimulating legislative interest and support for the work of the National Eye Institute.

Another finding was lack of sufficient laboratory space—across the country—for eye research. Over a span of years, RPB organized capital campaigns for the construction of modern eye research centers in large population areas: University of California, Los Angeles, Johns Hopkins University, Columbia University, University of Louisville, Medical College of Wisconsin, Baylor College of Medicine and Oregon Health Sciences University, Portland.

Through a grants program, Research to Prevent Blindness has channeled more than $407 million into eye research.

== Grants ==
RPB works with medical institutions throughout the United States to strengthen their programs in eye research. Unrestricted grant programs are intended to produce new scientific investigations, accelerate the pace of research and complement government grants.

Research to Prevent Blindness also provides individual grants, which are directed toward investigators working across all areas of vision science, on ground-breaking science.

Since its founding, RPB grant support has been identified with virtually every major scientific advance in eye research including the development of laser surgery for eye conditions, new drugs that prevent blindness, and refinements to the intraocular lenses used in cataract surgery.
