= European Association for Vision and Eye Research =

European Association for Vision and Eye Research (EVER)
- Formation: 1997
- Headquarters: Leuven, Belgium
- Members: 850 members
- President: Alain Bron
- Website: www.ever-f.eu

The European Association for Vision and Eye Research is a multidisciplinary scientific society that aims to encourage research and the dissemination of knowledge concerning the eye and vision by means of meetings, publications and exchange of information. It is an international non-profit association formed in agreement with the Belgian law. EVER is the largest European research association that covers all areas of ophthalmology and the vision science. The association currently has members from over 48 countries within Europe and abroad, and is organized in 11 scientific sections.

EVER was founded in 1997 in Montpellier, France, when The Association for Eye Research (AER), the European Community Ophthalmic Research Association (ECORA) and the Joint European Meetings in Ophthalmology and Vision (JERMOV) merged, and recognized by the Belgian Royal Decree on 20 September 1998.

== Functions and activities ==
EVER arranges its annual congress at the end of September or the beginning of October at a location close to the Mediterranean. The current location since 2012 has been Nice, France. Previously, the association has met in Palma de Mallorca, Spain, in 1998–2000, Alicante, Spain, in 2001–2003, Vilamoura, Portugal, in 2004–2006, Portorož, Slovenia, in 2007–2009 and Crete, Greece, in 2010–2011. Central events include free papers, special interest symposia, and keynote lectures. The association collaborates with other societies in the same field and some of these convene annually with EVER.

== Organizational structure ==
Membership is open to individuals of any nationality. Engagement or an interest in ophthalmic and vision research is required. A category for members-in-training also exists.

The association is governed by its general assembly and board, which are chaired by its president, according to its statutes and bye-laws. The members of the board are elected from and by the effective members of the association. The board has an executive council with a president, secretary general, treasurer, program secretary, president elect, vice president, vice president elect, past president (ex officio), and EVER Foundation liaison (ex officio), and the chairs of the 11 scientific sections:

- Anatomy / Cell Biology
- Cornea / Ocular Surface
- Electrophysiology / Physiological Optics / Vision Sciences
- Glaucoma
- Immunology / Microbiology
- Lens and Cataract
- Molecular Biology / Genetics / Epidemiology
- Neuro-ophthalmology / Strabismology / Paediatric / History
- Physiology / Biochemistry / Pharmacology
- Pathology / Oncology
- Retina / Vitreous

Board members are elected for five years. In case none of the elected board members has the Belgian nationality, the board will immediately co-opt a supplementary board member of Belgian nationality. At the end of their term of office, board members are eligible to become president or vice president of the association for a term of one year. The president, the vice-president and the program secretary are appointed by the board.

The past presidents of EVER are:

- 1998 Prof. Gisele Soubrane, France (acting)
- 1999 Prof. Gisele Soubrane, France
- 2000 Prof. Henk Spekreijse, The Netherlands
- 2001 Prof. Bertil Damato, United Kingdom
- 2002 Prof. John Forerster, United Kingdom
- 2003 Prof. Anthony Bron, United Kingdom
- 2004 Prof. Per Söderberg, Sweden
- 2005 Prof. Nicholas Galloway, United Kingdom
- 2006 Prof. Tero Kivelä, Finland
- 2007 Prof. Uwe Pleyer, Germany
- 2008 Prof. Harminder Dua, United Kingdom
- 2009 Prof. Charles Riva, Switzerland
- 2010 Prof. Graham Holder, United Kingdom
- 2011 Prof. Lene Martin, Sweden
- 2012 Prof. Leopold Schmetterer, Austria
- 2013 Prof. Philippe Kestelyn, Belgium
- 2014 Prof. Constantin Pournaras, Switzerland
- 2015 Prof. Bart Leroy, Belgium
- 2016 Prof. Aki Kawasaki, Switzerland

The current board members are:

- Andreas Clemens
- Bahram BODAGHI
- Jean-Frederic CHIBRET
- Jean-Jacques DE LAEY
- Tero KIVELÄ
- Constantin J. POURNARAS
- Gabriela SABORIO
- Gisèle SOUBRANE
- Marlene VERLAECKT

== Official journal ==
The official journal of EVER is Acta Ophthalmologica since April 2006. Since 2006, the EVER board and the board of the Acta Ophthalmologica Scandinavica Foundation have jointly organized an annual EVER-Acta Lecture at the time of the annual congress of EVER. The speaker is chosen in alternate years by the EVER board and the Acta board, and is honored with the EVER-Acta Silver Medal. The recipients of this medal and their keynote lecture topics so far are:

- 2006 Prof. Paul Sieving, United States: The interplay of clinical and basic knowledge in X-linked retinoschisis
- 2007 Prof. Morten La Cour, Denmark: The retinal pigment epithelium, friend or foe?
- 2008 Prof. Fridbert Jonasson, Iceland: Unraveling the genetics of exfoliation glaucoma
- 2009 Prof. Jost Jonas, Germany: From intravitreal cell-encoated drug therapy to low-(brain-)pressure-glaucoma
- 2010 Prof. Wolfgang Drexler, Austria: Where is retinal OCT heading
- 2011 Prof. Per Söderberg, Sweden: Clouding lens, swap or stop?
- 2012 Prof. Anders Heijl, Sweden: The changing roles of perimetry and perimeters in glaucoma management
- 2013 Prof. Tero Kivelä, Finland: Telomere maintenance and retinal vascularisation
- 2014 Prof. Neville Osborne, United Kingdom: Pathogenesis of glaucoma in relation to variable ganglion cell death and neuroprotection
- 2015 Prof. Russell Foster, United Kingdom: Regulating the body clock - the unrecognised role of the eye
- 2016 Prof. John Greenwood, United Kingdom: The pathogenic role of LRG1 in ocular neovascularisation - from discovery to targeted therapy
- 2017 Prof. Leopold Schmetterer, Singapore: Ocular imaging - what we see and what we would like to see
