= Lutein =

Yellow organic pigment created by plants

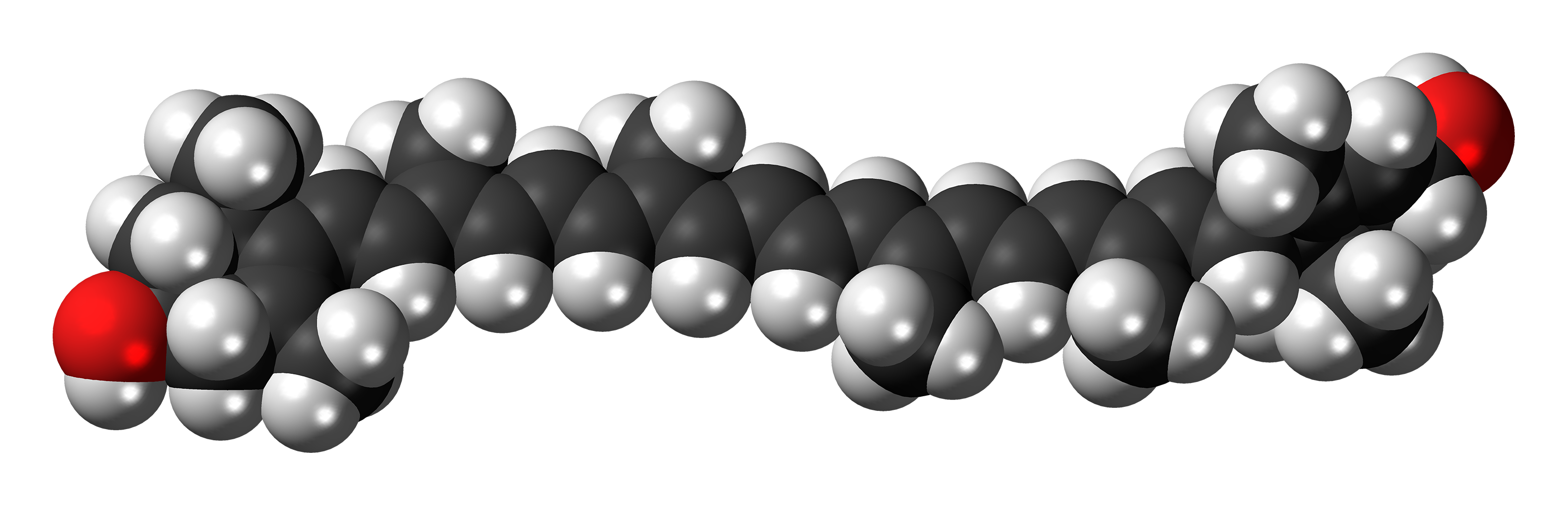

Names
- IUPAC name (3R,6R,3′R)-β,ε-Carotene-3,3′-diol
- Systematic IUPAC name (1R,4R)-4-{(1E,3E,5E,7E,9E,11E,13E,15E,17E)-18-[(4R)-4-Hydroxy-2,6,6-trimethylcyclohex-1-en-1-yl]-3,7,12,16-tetramethyloctadeca-1,3,5,7,9,11,13,15,17-nonaen-1-yl}-3,5,5-trimethylcyclohex-2-en-1-ol
- Other names: Luteine; trans-Lutein; Xanthophyll

Identifiers
CAS Number	127-40-2
3D model (JSmol)	Interactive image
ChEBI	CHEBI:28838
ChEMBL	ChEMBL173929
ChemSpider	4444655
ECHA InfoCard	100.004.401
E number	E161b (colours)
PubChem CID	5281243
UNII	X72A60C9MT
CompTox Dashboard (EPA)	DTXSID8046749
- InChI: InChI=1S/C40H56O2/c1-29(17-13-19-31(3)21-23-37-33(5)25-35(41)27-39(37,7)8)15-11-12-16-30(2)18-14-20-32(4)22-24-38-34(6)26-36(42)28-40(38,9)10/h11-25,35-37,41-42H,26-28H2,1-10H3/b12-11+,17-13+,18-14+,23-21+,24-22+,29-15+,30-16+,31-19+,32-20+/t35-,36+,37-/m0/s1 Key: KBPHJBAIARWVSC-RGZFRNHPSA-N; InChI=1S/C40H56O2/c1-29(17-13-19-31(3)21-23-37-33(5)25-35(41)27-39(37,7)8)15-11-12-16-30(2)18-14-20-32(4)22-24-38-34(6)26-36(42)28-40(38,9)10/h11-25,35-37,41-42H,26-28H2,1-10H3/b12-11+,17-13+,18-14+,23-21+,24-22+,29-15+,30-16+,31-19+,32-20+/t35-,36+,37-/m0/s1 Key: KBPHJBAIARWVSC-RGZFRNHPBY; Key: KBPHJBAIARWVSC-RGZFRNHPSA-N
- SMILES: CC1=C(C(C[C@@H](C1)O)(C)C)/C=C/C(=C/C=C/C(=C/C=C/C=C(\C)/C=C/C=C(\C)/C=C/[C@H]2C(=C[C@@H](CC2(C)C)O)C)/C)/C

Properties
Chemical formula	C_{40}H_{56}O_{2}
Molar mass	568.871 g/mol
Appearance	Red-orange crystalline solid
Melting point	190 °C (374 °F; 463 K)
Solubility in water	Insoluble
Solubility in fats	Soluble
- Except where otherwise noted, data are given for materials in their standard state (at 25 °C [77 °F], 100 kPa). verify (what is ?) Infobox references

Lutein (/ˈljuːtiɪn, -tiːn/; from Latin luteus meaning "yellow") is a xanthophyll and one of 600 known naturally occurring carotenoids. Lutein is synthesized only by plants, and like other xanthophylls is found in high quantities in green leafy vegetables such as spinach, kale and yellow carrots. In green plants, xanthophylls act to modulate light energy and serve as non-photochemical quenching agents to deal with triplet chlorophyll, an excited form of chlorophyll which is overproduced at high light levels during photosynthesis.

Animals obtain lutein by ingesting plants. In the human retina, lutein is absorbed from blood specifically into the macula lutea, although its precise role in the body is unknown. Lutein is also found in egg yolks and animal fats.

Lutein is isomeric with zeaxanthin, differing only in the placement of one double bond. Lutein and zeaxanthin can be interconverted in the body through an intermediate called meso-zeaxanthin. The principal natural stereoisomer of lutein is (3R,3′R,6′R)-beta,epsilon-carotene-3,3′-diol. Lutein is a lipophilic molecule and is generally insoluble in water. The presence of the long chromophore of conjugated double bonds (polyene chain) provides the distinctive light-absorbing properties. The polyene chain is susceptible to oxidative degradation by light or heat and is chemically unstable in acids.

Lutein is present in plants as fatty-acid esters, with one or two fatty acids bound to the two hydroxyl groups. For this reason, saponification (de-esterification) of lutein esters to yield free lutein may yield lutein in any ratio from 1:1 to 1:2 molar ratio with the saponifying fatty acid.

== As a pigment ==
This xanthophyll, like its sister compound zeaxanthin, has primarily been used in food and supplement manufacturing as a colorant due to its yellow-red color. Lutein absorbs blue light and therefore appears yellow at low concentrations and orange-red at high concentrations.

Many songbirds (like golden oriole, evening grosbeak, yellow warbler, common yellowthroat and Javan green magpies, but not American goldfinch or yellow canaries) deposit lutein obtained from the diet into growing tissues to color their feathers.

== Role in human eyes ==
Although lutein is concentrated in the macula – a small area of the retina responsible for three-color vision – the precise functional role of retinal lutein has not been determined.

=== Macular degeneration ===
In 2013, findings of the Age-Related Eye Disease Study (AREDS2) showed that a dietary supplement formulation containing lutein reduced progression of age-related macular degeneration (AMD) by 25 percent. However, lutein and zeaxanthin had no overall effect on preventing AMD, but rather "the participants with low dietary intake of lutein and zeaxanthin at the start of the study, but who took an AREDS formulation with lutein and zeaxanthin during the study, were about 25 percent less likely to develop advanced AMD compared with participants with similar dietary intake who did not take lutein and zeaxanthin."

In AREDS2, participants took one of four AREDS formulations: the original AREDS formulation, AREDS formulation with no beta-carotene, AREDS with low zinc, AREDS with no beta-carotene and low zinc. In addition, they took one of four additional supplement or combinations including lutein and zeaxanthin (10 mg and 2 mg), omega-3 fatty acids (1,000 mg), lutein/zeaxanthin and omega-3 fatty acids, or placebo. The study reported that there was no overall additional benefit from adding omega-3 fatty acids or lutein and zeaxanthin to the formulation. However, the study did find benefits in two subgroups of participants: those not given beta-carotene, and those who had little lutein and zeaxanthin in their diets. Removing beta-carotene did not curb the formulation's protective effect against developing advanced AMD, which was important given that high doses of beta-carotene had been linked to higher risk of lung cancers in smokers. It was recommended to replace beta-carotene with lutein and zeaxanthin in future formulations for these reasons.

- Three subsequent meta-analyses of dietary lutein and zeaxanthin concluded that these carotenoids lower the risk of progression from early stage AMD to late stage AMD.
- An updated 2023 Cochrane review of 26 studies from several countries, however, concluded that dietary supplements containing zeaxanthin and lutein alone have little effect when compared to placebo on the progression of AMD. In general, there remains insufficient evidence to assess the effectiveness of dietary or supplemental zeaxanthin or lutein in treatment or prevention of early AMD.

=== Cataract research ===
There is preliminary epidemiological evidence that increasing lutein and zeaxanthin intake lowers the risk of cataract development. Consumption of more than 2.4 mg of lutein/zeaxanthin daily from foods and supplements was significantly correlated with reduced incidence of nuclear lens opacities, as revealed from data collected during a 13- to 15-year period in one study.

Two meta-analyses confirm a correlation between high diet content or high serum concentrations of lutein and zeaxanthin and a decrease in the risk of cataract. There is only one published clinical intervention trial testing for an effect of lutein and zeaxanthin supplementation on cataracts. The AREDS2 trial enrolled subjects at risk for progression to advanced age-related macular degeneration. Overall, the group getting lutein (10 mg) and zeaxanthin (2 mg) were NOT less likely to progress to needing cataract surgery. The authors speculated that there may be a cataract prevention benefit for people with low dietary intake of lutein and zeaxanthin, but recommended more research.

== In foods ==
Lutein is a natural part of a human diet found in orange-yellow fruits and flowers, and in leafy vegetables. According to the NHANES 2013-2014 survey, adults in the United States consume on average 1.7 mg/day of lutein and zeaxanthin combined. No recommended dietary allowance currently exists for lutein. Some positive health effects have been seen at dietary intake levels of 6–10 mg/day. The only definitive side effect of excess lutein consumption is bronzing of the skin (carotenodermia).

As a food additive, lutein has the E number E161b (INS number 161b) and is extracted from the petals of Mexican marigold (Tagetes erecta). It is approved for use in the EU and Australia-New Zealand. In the United States, lutein may not be used as a food coloring for foods intended for human consumption, but can be added to animal feed and is allowed as a human dietary supplement often in combination with zeaxanthin.

Some foods contain relatively high amounts of lutein and zeaxanthin. In a ranking provided by the USDA FoodData Central database, the highest food levels of lutein and zeaxanthin (expressed together as micrograms per 100 grams of powder or fresh-frozen or raw weight) are found in dry paprika powder (18.9 milligrams per 100 g or 1.29 mg per 1 tablespoon serving), frozen spinach (15.7 mg per 100 g), sweet potato leaves, dandelion greens, spice red cayenne pepper powder (13.2 mg per 100 g or 0.237 mg per 1 teaspoon serving), and turnip greens (12.8 milligrams per 100 g).

=== Safety ===
In humans, the Observed Safe Level (OSL) for lutein, based on a non-government organization evaluation, is 20 mg/day. Although much higher levels have been tested without adverse effects and may also be safe, the data for intakes above the OSL are not sufficient for a confident conclusion of long-term safety. Neither the U.S. Food and Drug Administration nor the European Food Safety Authority considers lutein an essential nutrient or has acted to set a tolerable upper intake level.

== Commercial value ==
The lutein market is segmented into pharmaceutical, dietary supplement, food, pet food, and animal and fish feed. This includes chickens (usually in combination with other carotenoids), to get color in egg yolks, and fish farms to color the flesh closer to wild-caught color. In the dietary supplement industry, the major market for lutein is for products with claims of helping maintain eye health.

== See also ==
- Carotenoids
- List of phytochemicals in food
