= National Eye Institute =

U.S. health institute

- Abbreviation: NEI
- Formation: 1968
- Type: U.S. government agency
- Legal status: Active
- Purpose: "...eliminate vision loss and improve quality of life through vision research"
- Headquarters: Bethesda, Maryland
- Region served: United States
- Official language: English
- Director: Michael F. Chiang
- Parent organization: National Institutes of Health
- Affiliations: United States Public Health Service
- Website: www.nei.nih.gov

The National Eye Institute (NEI) is part of the U.S. National Institutes of Health (NIH), an agency of the U.S. Department of Health and Human Services. The mission of NEI is "to eliminate vision loss and improve quality of life through vision research." NEI consists of two major branches for research: an extramural branch that funds studies outside NIH and an intramural branch that funds research on the NIH campus in Bethesda, Maryland. Most of the NEI budget funds extramural research.

NEI was established in 1968 as the nation's leading supporter of eye health and vision research projects. These projects include basic science research into the fundamental biology of the eye and the visual system. NEI also funds translational and clinical research aimed at developing and testing therapies for eye diseases and disorders. This research is focused on developing therapies for leading causes of vision loss including glaucoma, diabetic retinopathy, age-related macular degeneration (AMD), cataract, myopia and amblyopia. NEI also funds research on many other causes of vision loss including retinitis pigmentosa, uveitis, retinal detachment, and rare eye diseases and disorders.

Since its founding, NEI has supported the work of several Nobel Prize recipients, including Roger Y. Tsien (2008); Peter Agre (2003); David H. Hubel (1981); and Torsten Wiesel (1981).

== History ==
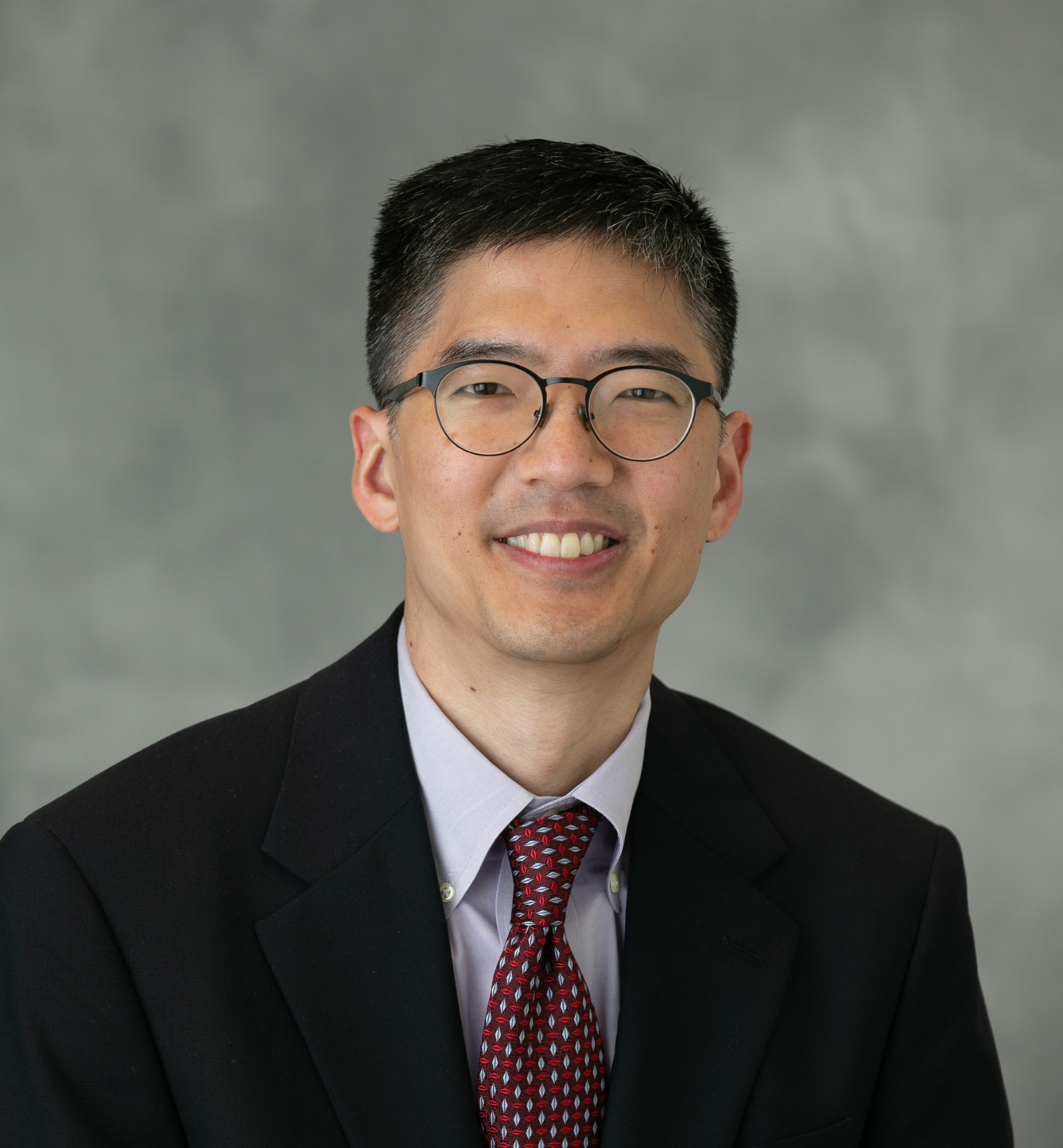
NEI Director Michael F. Chiang

=== National Institute of Neurological Disease and Blindness, 1950 to 1968 ===
Before 1968, vision research at NIH was funded and overseen by the National Institute of Neurological Disease and Blindness (now known as the National Institute of Neurological Disorders and Stroke), which was established in 1950, after President Harry S. Truman signed the Omnibus Medical Research Act. This bill marked the beginning of vision research at the federal level.

Organizing, structuring, and separating vision and neurological research was a challenge at National Institute of Neurological Disease and Blindness. In its early years, securing funding was difficult. The institute established an Ophthalmology Branch, which served primarily as an ophthalmic consultation service for NIH. Ophthalmic research grew slowly throughout the 1950s and early 1960s, producing results despite small budgets. One notable example was the study that identified the cause of retrolental fibroplasia (now known as retinopathy of prematurity, the leading cause of blindness among children at the time.

Despite this progress, some prominent members of the vision research community asserted that too many important proposals for ophthalmic research were not granted funding. They also emphasized that ophthalmology could stand on its own as a discrete academic discipline beyond surgery and neurology. This prompted some leading academic ophthalmologists and vision community supporters to campaign for a separate institute focused solely on vision research. These advocates included Bernard Becker, M.D.; A. Edward Maumenee, M.D.; David Glendenning Cogan, M.D.; Frank Newell, M.D.; Michael J. Hogan, M.D.; Frank C. Winter, M.D.; John M. McLean, M.D.; and Jules Stein, M.D.

The lobbying campaign for a separate ophthalmology-focused institute began in earnest in the mid-1960s and culminated in President Lyndon B. Johnson signing legislation creating NEI as part of NIH. NEI was established on August 16, 1968, as the United States' first civilian governmental body focused on eye diseases, eye disorders, and vision research.

=== NEI, 1968 to present ===
NEI officially began operating on December 26, 1968, and the first meeting of the National Advisory Eye Council occurred on April 3, 1969. The first director of NEI, Carl Kupfer, was appointed on January 11, 1970.

From 1970 to Kupfer's retirement in 2000, NEI's budget grew from $24 million to over $500 million.[3] Kupfer expanded NEI's vision research program to focus not only on the eyes but on the entire visual system, including visual processing in the brain.

In June 2001, Paul A. Sieving, joined NEI as its second director and served until July 2019.

Under Sieving's directorship, NEI established the Audacious Goals Initiative for Regenerative Medicine. The initiative is a strategic research effort to replace cells of the retina that have been damaged by disease or injury and to restore their connections to the visual centers of the brain. Success will mean new approaches to prevent and even reverse vision loss caused by diseases such as AMD and glaucoma.

== Directors ==
Directors dating to 1970

No.	Portrait	Director	Took office	Left office	Refs.
1		Carl Kupfer	January 11, 1970	July 15, 2000	
acting		Jack A. McLaughlin	July 16, 2000	June 16, 2001	
2		Paul A. Sieving	June 17, 2001	July 29, 2019	
acting		Santa J. Tumminia	July 30, 2019	November 15, 2020	
3		Michael F. Chiang	November 16, 2020	Present	

== Organizational structure ==
=== Director ===
In November 2020, Michael F. Chiang, began serving as the third director of NEI. Chiang, a pediatric ophthalmologist, conducts research on the interface of biomedical informatics and clinical ophthalmology in areas such as retinopathy of prematurity, telehealth, artificial intelligence, electronic health records, data science, and genotype–phenotype correlation.

=== Extramural Research Program ===
NEI supports extramural vision research through about 2,100 research grants and training awards to scientists at more than 150 medical centers, universities, and other institutions across the United States and worldwide.

The NEI extramural research program is organized by anatomy and disease around core areas: retina; cornea; lens and cataract; glaucoma and optic neuropathy; strabismus, amblyopia, and visual processing; and vision rehabilitation. These core areas reflect clinical divisions of most ophthalmology and optometry departments.

In addition to these core program areas, the NEI Strategic Plan Vision for the Future 2021-2025 outlines seven cross-cutting areas of emphasis: genetics, neuroscience, immunology, regenerative medicine, data science, quality of life, and public health and health disparities. These areas emphasize the methodological expertise required to address challenges across the entire visual system and facilitate translation of promising findings into clinical care and population health.

=== Intramural Research Program ===
NEI's Intramural Research Program is part of the NIH Intramural Research Program, which conducts eye and vision research on the NIH campus in Bethesda, Maryland.

=== Research Initiatives and Offices ===
In support of its extramural and intramural activities, the NEI has established several offices and research initiatives to facilitate oversight and collaboration in specific areas of emphasis.

== Research achievements ==
NEI-supported research has contributed important knowledge about the cause, progression, and treatment of many eye diseases. Some notable examples are described below.

=== Age-related macular degeneration ===
AMD typically happens when aging damages the macula. It is a leading cause of vision loss for older adults. It can blur the sharp central vision needed to read, see faces, and do close-up work. NEI has supported several studies investigating treatments for AMD, including:

- Age-Related Eye Disease Study (AREDS): This randomized controlled trial showed that a dietary supplement formula with high doses of antioxidants, zinc, and copper reduced the risk of advanced AMD and related vision loss.
- Age-Related Eye Disease Study 2 (AREDS2): This study investigated the roles of zinc and beta-carotene in the original AREDS formulation. It also examined whether adding omega-3 fatty acids and the antioxidants lutein and zeaxanthin would improve the effectiveness of the AREDS formulation.

Although AREDS2 found no overall additional benefits, it did show that two groups of participants had improved results: participants who took the AREDS formulation with no beta-carotene and participants with very low initial levels of lutein and zeaxanthin in their diets.

- Comparison of Age-Related Macular Degeneration Treatments Trial: Lucentis-Avastin Trial: This two-year, multicenter clinical trial compared the effectiveness of two treatments used for AMD: Lucentis and Avastin. It showed that both treatments are equally effective in treating AMD and improving vision, whether used monthly or as needed.
- Complications of Age-Related Macular Degeneration Prevention Trial: This study assessed the safety and effectiveness of laser treatment in preventing vision loss caused by AMD in people with large drusen. It showed that laser treatment was not effective at preventing vision loss.
- Submacular Surgery Trials: These trials investigated the risks and benefits of surgery to remove a type of lesion—known as choroidal neovascularization—that is associated with AMD. The results showed that surgery to remove these lesions did not help preserve or improve vision in patients with AMD.

=== Diabetic retinopathy ===
Diabetic retinopathy is an eye condition that can cause vision loss and blindness in people with diabetes. NEI has supported several studies on the treatment of diabetic retinopathy, including:

- Diabetic Retinopathy Study: This study evaluated whether treatment with either an argon laser or xenon arc lamp could prevent severe vision loss caused by diabetic retinopathy. It showed that this type of treatment effectively reduced the risk of severe vision loss, especially in patients at higher risk.
- Diabetic Retinopathy Vitrectomy Study: This study assessed whether patients with diabetic retinopathy would benefit from early vitrectomy (within one to six months). The results showed that patients receiving early vitrectomy had better visual acuity than those receiving delayed vitrectomy (after 12 months).
- Early Treatment Diabetic Retinopathy Study: This multicenter, randomized clinical trial investigated using laser treatment and aspirin to treat and delay the progression of clinically significant macular edema. This study showed that focal argon laser photocoagulation reduced the risk of additional vision loss but that aspirin had no effect on the risk, onset, progression, or severity of retinopathy.
- Anti-VEGF therapy for diabetic retinopathy: This two-year, NEI-supported study, by the DRCR Retina Network found that the drug Lucentis can be an effective treatment for people with advanced diabetic retinopathy or proliferative diabetic retinopathy. Lucentis is a vascular endothelial growth factor (VEGF) inhibitor that can block the growth of abnormal blood vessels—a feature of proliferative diabetic retinopathy. The results suggested that VEGF inhibitors like Lucentis may help prevent macular edema.

=== Glaucoma ===
Glaucoma refers to a group of eye diseases that damage the optic nerve and cause vision loss and blindness. Open-angle glaucoma is the most common form of glaucoma in the United States. Most clinical trials focus on managing open-angle glaucoma by reducing intraocular pressure (IOP), the only known modifiable risk factor for glaucoma. NEI has supported several studies, including:

- Advanced Glaucoma Intervention Study: This prospective, multicenter randomized trial aimed to assess the long-range outcomes of two intervention sequences to manage advanced glaucoma. After seven years, the study found different results for Black/African American patients and white patients. As a result, a treatment program that begins with laser surgery is recommended for Black/African American patients with advanced glaucoma, while a treatment program that begins with trabeculectomy is recommended for white patients with advanced glaucoma and no life-threatening health problems.
- Collaborative Initial Glaucoma Treatment Study: This study compared the effects of medical treatment to early filtration surgery in newly diagnosed open-angle glaucoma. It found that increased eye pressure was significantly decreased in both the medically and surgically treated groups, with the surgery group having a larger decrease. However, in the surgery group, the need for subsequent cataract surgery was significantly higher, and patients were more likely to lose visual acuity and visual field within the first few years. After four years, patients in both groups were similar in visual acuity and visual field. Few patients developed serious vision loss from glaucoma after either treatment.
- Early Manifest Glaucoma Trial: This study evaluated the effects of reducing eye pressure versus no treatment or late treatment for early open-angle glaucoma. It showed that reducing eye pressure can be valuable as early glaucoma treatment—but when to offer this treatment should be decided on a case-by-case basis.
- Fluorouracil Filtering Surgery Study: This study investigated the safety and effectiveness of 5-fluorouracil after trabeculectomy. It showed that using 5-fluorouracil after glaucoma surgery improved patients' results and reduced the need for additional surgeries and medications.
- Glaucoma Laser Trial and Glaucoma Laser Trial Follow-up Study: The initial study examined the safety and effectiveness of argon laser trabeculoplasty for treating primary open-angle glaucoma. The results showed that argon laser trabeculoplasty was as safe and effective as using timolol maleate eye drops (the standard treatment). The follow-up study confirmed the results and showed that the side effects of argon laser trabeculoplasty were temporary.
- Ocular Hypertension Treatment Study: This study measured the effectiveness of medicated eye drops to treat high eye pressure to see whether this treatment could help prevent primary open-angle glaucoma. It showed that treating high eye pressure with medicated eye drops can safely and effectively delay or prevent primary open-angle glaucoma.

=== Amblyopia (lazy eye) ===
Amblyopia is a type of visual impairment that occurs when the brain does not recognize visual signals from one eye and favors the other eye. NEI has supported research into effective treatment for amblyopia, including:

- Amblyopia treatment in older children: This study aimed to evaluate whether children older than 7 years with amblyopia could benefit from the treatments used in younger children (prescription eyeglasses, patching, and atropine eye drops). The results showed that older children whose amblyopia was not corrected with eyeglasses alone can benefit from patching or atropine eye drops—especially if they did not get treatment for amblyopia earlier in childhood.
- Amblyopia Treatment Studies: These studies examined several methods of treating amblyopia, including prescription eyeglasses, patching, and atropine eye drops. The results showed that:
  1. Wearing prescription eyeglasses is effective for some children with amblyopia, though others also need occlusion treatment, like patching.
  2. Increasing the daily duration of patching can increase the effectiveness of correction with eyeglasses.
  3. Using atropine eye drops daily is as effective as patching for at least six hours per day.
  4. Wearing a Bangerter filter (a sticker attached to an eyeglass lens to make it opaque) full time is as effective as patching for two hours per day.
- Patching regimens to treat severe amblyopia: An NEI-funded study showed that six hours of daily patching was as effective as full-time patching in treating severe amblyopia in children.
- Pediatric vision scanner for amblyopia screening: NEI funded the development of blinq, a handheld device that easily and accurately screens children for amblyopia.

=== Corneal stromal keratitis ===
Corneal stromal keratitis or herpetic simplex keratitis is inflammation of the cornea caused by herpes infection of the eye. NEI-funded research led to a breakthrough in treatment for this condition:

- Acyclovir Prevention Trial: This multicenter, randomized clinical trial was part of a larger study called the Herpetic Eye Disease Study (HEDS). It investigated whether the oral antiviral drug acyclovir would prevent herpes infection of the eye from recurring. The study showed that acyclovir reduced the recurrence of both herpes infection of the eye and corneal stromal keratitis, a severe form of the disease.

=== Optic nerve diseases ===
Optic nerve diseases, like optic neuropathy and optic neuritis, can damage the connection between the eye and the visual processing centers of the brain and cause vision loss. NEI has supported studies on the treatment of optic nerve disease, including:

- Ischemic Optic Neuropathy Decompression Trial: This study aimed to evaluate the safety and efficacy of optic nerve decompression surgery to treat nonarteritic ischemic optic neuropathy. It found that compared with careful follow-up, this surgery was not beneficial in treating this condition.
- Optic Neuritis Treatment Trial: This study assessed the efficacy of oral prednisone alone or intravenous methylprednisolone followed by oral prednisone for treating optic neuritis, which is frequently associated with multiple sclerosis. The results showed that patients who received intravenous methylprednisolone recovered their vision faster than those who received oral prednisone and had a much lower risk of experiencing optic neuritis again.

=== Retinopathy of prematurity ===
Retinopathy of prematurity happens when abnormal blood vessels grow in the retina and cause vision loss and blindness in babies who are premature or who weigh less than 3 pounds at birth. NEI has supported studies investigating the treatment and progression of retinopathy of prematurity, including:

- Cryotherapy for Retinopathy of Prematurity Trial: This study measured the effectiveness of cryotherapy in preventing vision loss in babies with retinopathy of prematurity. It showed that cryotherapy could prevent vision loss without risking babies' future ability to see.
- Early Treatment of Retinopathy of Prematurity Study: This study aimed to help doctors use certain eye characteristics to predict which babies would benefit from early treatment with cryotherapy to prevent severe vision loss later in life. The results showed that weekly examinations made it possible to identify infants who would benefit from early treatment.
- Effects of Light Reduction on Retinopathy of Prematurity Trial: This study measured the effect of reduced light exposure in babies with retinopathy of prematurity. It showed that light exposure does not significantly affect premature babies' risk for developing retinopathy of prematurity.
- Supplemental Therapeutic Oxygen for Prethreshold Retinopathy of Prematurity) Trial: This study aimed to determine what effect, if any, supplemental oxygen therapy has on how retinopathy of prematurity progresses in premature babies. It showed that supplemental oxygen does not cause moderate illness to become severe, so there is no need to restrict the use of oxygen therapy in babies with moderate retinopathy of prematurity.
- Telemedicine Approaches to Evaluating Acute-phase Retinopathy of Prematurity Trial: This study measured whether trained medical staff at a remote image reading center could use retinal photos to identify babies with retinopathy of prematurity as accurately as ophthalmologists examining babies in person. The results showed that the trained medical staff were almost as accurate as ophthalmologists at identifying retinopathy of prematurity in premature babies. They also found nearly half of advanced cases 15 days earlier, on average, than ophthalmologists.

=== Retinitis pigmentosa ===
Retinitis pigmentosa refers to a group of genetic eye diseases that cause cells in the retina to degenerate, leading to impaired night vision and loss of peripheral vision. NEI has supported research into therapies that slow disease progression, including:

- Gene therapy: In a canine model, NEI-funded research showed that gene therapy prevented vision loss in late-stage retinitis pigmentosa by stopping the thinning of the retinal layer (where photoreceptors are located) and preserving the surviving photoreceptors.

=== Uveitis ===
Uveitis is inflammation of the uvea, the middle layer of the eye between the sclera and the retina. NEI has supported several studies to examine the causes of uveitis, including:

- First-line Antimetabolites as Steroid-sparing Treatment Trial: This study compared two steroid-sparing immunosuppressant treatments for uveitis: methotrexate and mycophenolate mofetil. It showed that methotrexate is at least as effective as mycophenolate at treating uveitis.
- Multicenter Uveitis Steroid Treatment Trial: This study compared two treatments for uveitis: steroid and immunosuppressant pills and a steroid eye implant (fluocinolone acetonide implant). This study showed that for most people with uveitis, treatment with steroid and immunosuppressant pills is safer and more effective than steroid implants.
- PeriOcular vs. INTravitreal Corticosteroids for Uveitic Macular Edema Trial: This study compared three treatments for uveitic macular edema, a common complication of uveitis: periocular (near the eye) triamcinolone acetonide shots, intravitreal (inside the eye) triamcinolone acetonide shots, and intravitreal shots to place implants that slowly release dexamethasone inside the eye. This study showed that intravitreal delivery of either steroid was more effective than periocular delivery at controlling uveitic macular edema and preserving vision.
- Uveitis and T cells: NEI researchers studied gut bacteria and how it protects the body's natural flora to learn more about how immune cells attack the eye in autoimmune eye diseases like uveitis. The study showed that the activation of immune cells, also known as T cells, to attack the eye is affected by gut bacteria. These results shed light on the causes of uveitis and other autoimmune diseases.

=== Leber congenital amaurosis ===
Leber congenital amaurosis is a rare inherited eye disease that impairs vision starting in infancy. NEI supported work leading to a gene therapy for one type of this disease:

- RPE65 gene therapy: NEI-funded research led to the discovery of the RPE65 gene and a gene therapy for Leber congenital amaurosis associated with an RPE65 gene mutation. This gene makes a protein in the retinal pigment epithelium. In a clinical trial testing the gene therapy, patients with the gene mutation received healthy RPE65 genes by injection. Participants reported an improved ability to see in dim light within days of the treatment, and researchers found evidence of improved eyesight and retinal sensitivity.

In December 2017, Luxturna became the first directly administered gene therapy approved in the United States that targets a disease caused by mutations in a specific gene. It was approved for the treatment of patients with confirmed biallelic RPE65 mutation-associated retinal dystrophy that leads to vision loss and may cause complete blindness in certain patients.

=== Technology development ===
NEI has invested in the development of technologies to support diagnosis and management. A few examples of this investment include:

- Laser therapies: NEI has contributed to the development and evaluation of medical laser treatments to treat AMD, glaucoma, and myopia (nearsightedness), and other refractive errors.
- Noninvasive imaging: NEI-funded researchers supported the development of optical coherence tomography, a technology that allows doctors to see the tissues inside the eye in real time without surgery. With optical coherence tomography, doctors can look for early signs of eye diseases and monitor how a patient's disease progresses or responds to treatment.

== Education and outreach activities ==
Part of NEI's mission is to educate health care providers, scientists, policymakers, and the public about advances in vision research and their impact on health and quality of life. This effort is led by NEI's National Eye Health Education Program.

=== National Eye Health Education Program ===
NEI created the National Eye Health Education Program to educate professionals and the public about the importance of eye health. The program partners with more than 60 national organizations representing health professionals, educators, and patients in accomplishing this mission. It also oversees public and professional education programs on diabetic eye disease, glaucoma, vision rehabilitation, special population outreach, and vision and aging—with a focus on individuals and populations at higher risk of eye health disorders, including older people, those with diabetes, Black/African American people, and Hispanic/Latino people.

The program also draws on research supported by NIH and NEI to identify other populations at risk (e.g., Asian American people, residents of rural communities) and to produce educational materials for professional and public audiences. It emphasizes the importance of early detection and timely treatment of eye disease and the benefits of vision rehabilitation. The program also aims to increase awareness among health professionals and the public of science-based health information that can be applied to preserving sight and preventing blindness.

=== Eye on the Future Teen Video Contest ===
In 2022, the NEI created the Eye on the Future Teen Video Contest to foster the next generation of American scientists. The NEI awards American youth who create educational videos in three categories: "Science in your world," "Science in the field or lab," and "Science in your future." One winner is selected in each category, each receiving a prize of $2,000 USD.

Contest Winners
Name of Person	Year	Award	Category
Thuy-Tien Tran	2023	1st Place	Science in your world
Celia Cooley	2023	1st Place	Science in the field or lab
Mark Leschinsky	2023	1st Place	Science in your future
Meenakshi Ambati	2022	Winner	N/A
Sanjana Kumar	2022	Winner	N/A
